= Coventry station (GCRTA) =

Rapid transit station in Cleveland

Coventry
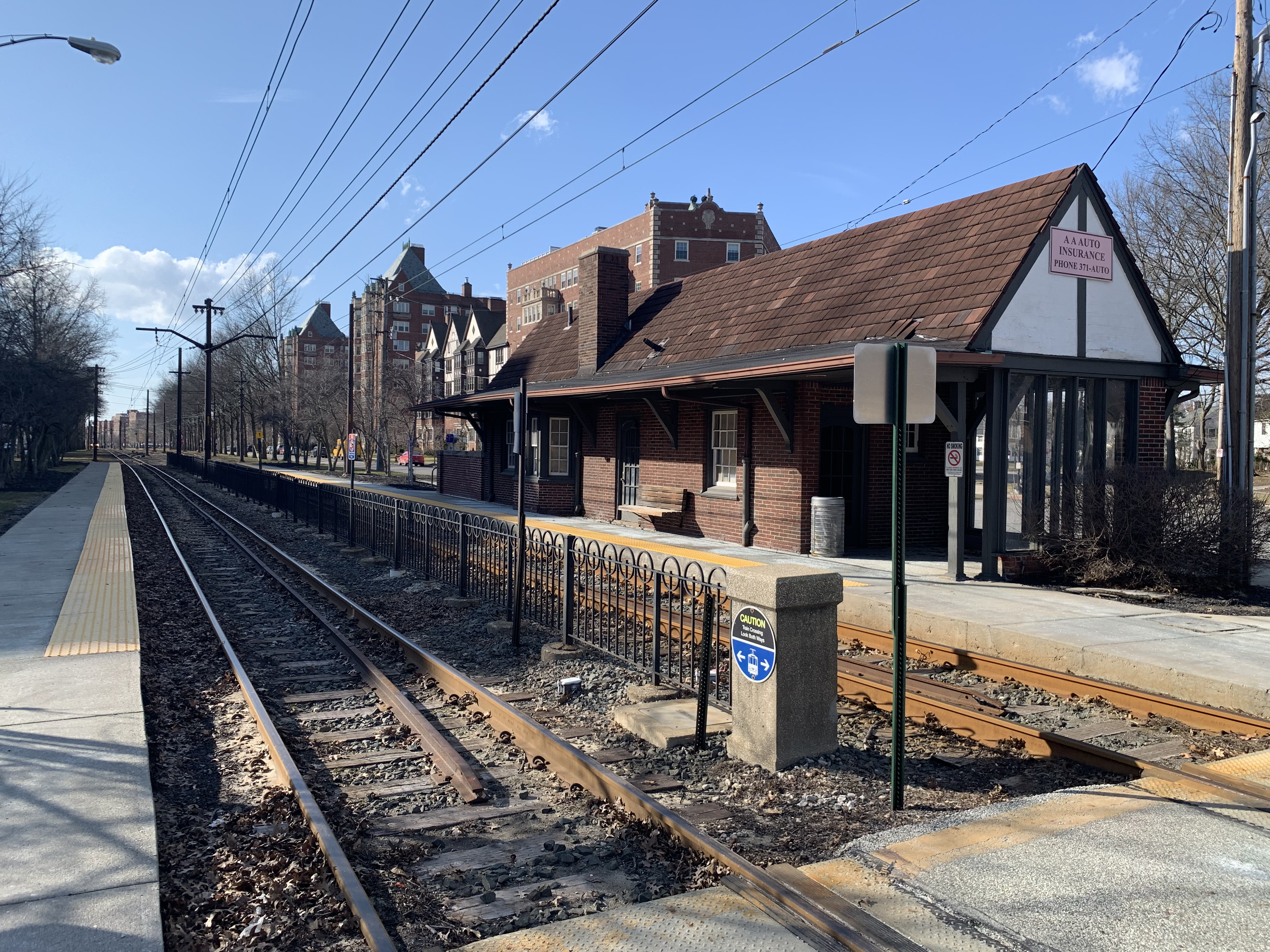
- Coventry station platforms with the station house on the Westbound platform in March 2022

General information
- Location: 14100 Shaker Boulevard; Shaker Heights, Ohio
- Coordinates: 41°29′0″N 81°35′5″W
- Owner: City of Shaker Heights
- Operator: Greater Cleveland Regional Transit Authority
- Line: Shaker Boulevard
- Platforms: 2 side platforms
- Tracks: 2

Construction
- Structure type: At-grade
- Cycle facilities: Racks
- Accessible: No

Other information
- Website: riderta.com/facilities/coventry

History
- Opened: December 17, 1913; 112 years ago
- Rebuilt: 1980
- Original company: Cleveland Railway

Services
Preceding station	Rapid Transit	Following station
Shaker Square toward Tower City	Green Line	Southington toward Green Road
Former services
Preceding station	Cleveland Railway	Following station
Shaker Square toward Terminal Square	Shaker Line 1913–1930	Southington toward Warrensville
Fairmount (Shaker) Terminus	Coventry Shuttle 1920–1923	Terminus
Location

Coventry station is a stop on the RTA light rail Green Line on the border between Cleveland and Shaker Heights, Ohio, located in the median of Shaker Boulevard (Ohio State Route 87) at its intersection with Coventry Road, after which the station is named.

== History ==
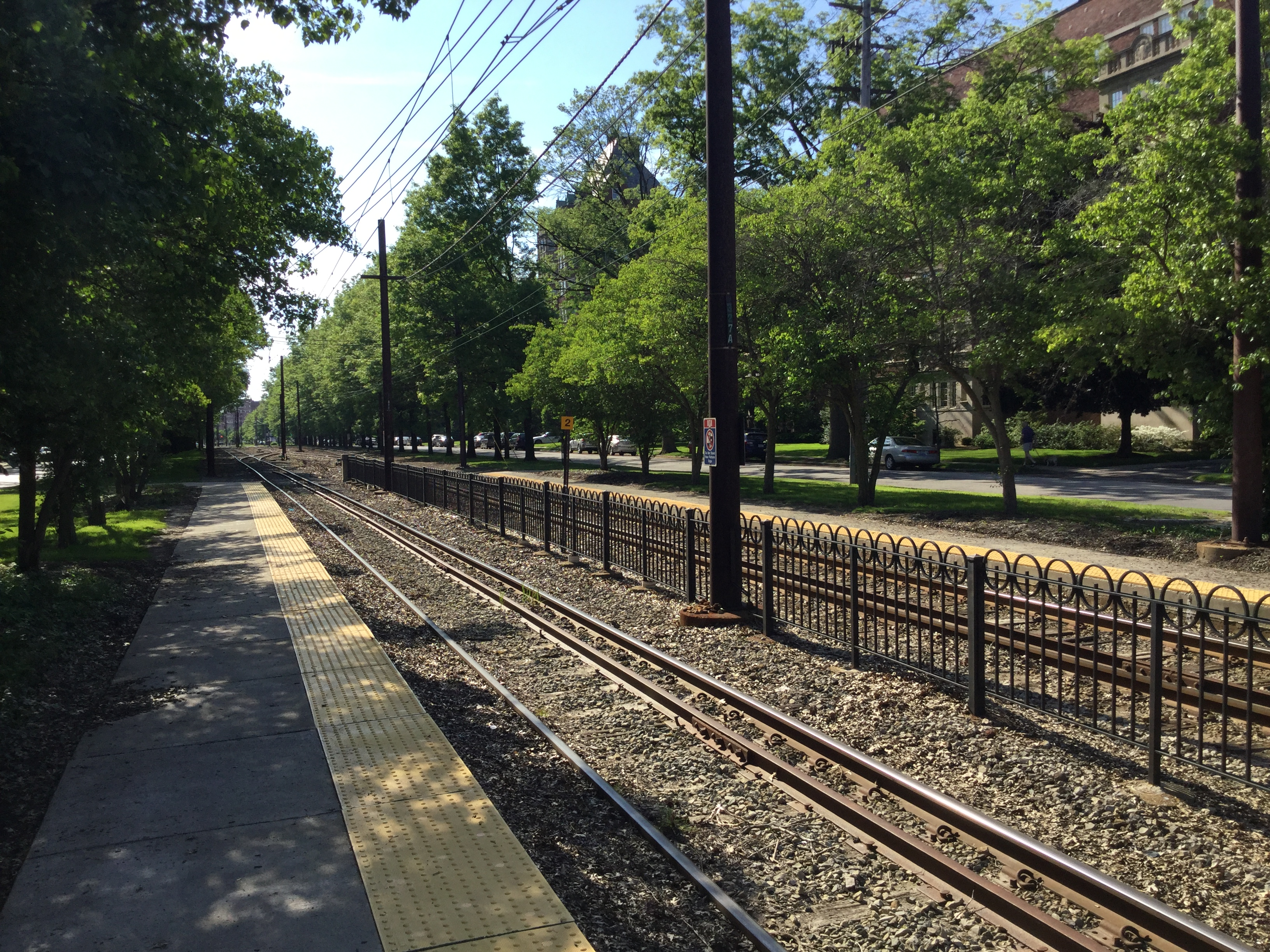
The station platforms in May 2018

The station opened on December 17, 1913, with the initiation of rail service on what is now Shaker Boulevard. The rail line was in the nature of a streetcar line, and it ran from the existing tracks on Fairmount Boulevard, south on Coventry Road, and then east along the newly laid-out boulevard, initially an extension of Coventry. At that time, there was no Shaker Boulevard west of Coventry, and Coventry did not extend south beyond Shaker. The line was built by Cleveland Interurban Railroad (CIRR) and operated by the Cleveland Railway until 1930. The railway also operated the streetcar line on Fairmount Boulevard. Trains ran from the terminus at Fontenay Road, down Coventry Road, and then to downtown Cleveland using the Cleveland Railway tracks from Fairmount Boulevard.

In 1920, the line was extended west from Coventry Road along new right-of-way to East 34th Street where the trains resumed traveling on Cleveland Railway tracks to downtown Cleveland. Service on this new line began from Shaker Boulevard on August 16, 1920. The new line significantly reduced travel time to downtown as considerable street running was eliminated. However, at CIRR's request Cleveland Railway continued to operate shuttle service along Coventry Road from Fairmount Boulevard to Shaker Boulevard, and this service was subsidized by CIRR. A station house with a waiting room was constructed at Coventry Road and Shaker Boulevard to serve passengers making the connection. It was constructed by Standard Oil Company of Ohio (Sohio) at a cost of US$17,500 (equivalent to $281,250 in 2025), and it included two gas pumps along westbound Shaker Boulevard. Sohio's construction price was applied against a long-term lease with CIRR.

The Coventry Road shuttle service lasted only until March 12, 1923. When CIRR discontinued the subsidy and the service ended, there were numerous objections, and even a lawsuit by the City of Cleveland Heights. CIRR prevailed and formally petitioned the Ohio Public Utilities Commission to abandon the right-of-way on Coventry Road on June 17, 1925. The need for the station house at Coventry station ended, but the service station there continued for many years. After the station house's use as a service station ended, it was leased to a series of tenants for other uses.

In 1980 and 1981, the Green and Blue Lines were completely renovated with new track, ballast, poles and wiring, and new stations were built along the line. The historic Coventry station house—its days as a gasoline service station long ended—was renovated with the addition of new exterior waiting spaces. The renovated line along Shaker Boulevard opened on October 11, 1980. For many years, Coventry was the sole remaining station to retain its yellow station name sign, once a fixture of all stations on the Shaker and Van Aken lines. However, the sign has since been removed.

== Station layout ==
The station has two side platforms, both located west of Coventry Road. The westbound has a relatively large Tudor-style station house. The station does not have ramps to allow passengers with disabilities to access trains.

== Notable places nearby ==
- Plymouth Church of Shaker Heights
