= Cleveland Metro =

Cleveland Metro can refer to:

- Greater Cleveland, the metropolitan area surrounding and including Cleveland, Ohio.
- RTA Rapid Transit, a system consisting of rapid transit and light rail serving Cleveland, Ohio.
