= West Green =

West Green may refer to:

- West Green, a portion of the campus of Ohio University
- West Green, West Sussex, England
- West Green, Hampshire, England
- West Green, London, England
  - West Green (ward)
- West Green, Georgia, United States
- West Green (RTA Rapid Transit station), Shaker Heights, Ohio
