= Courtland station =

Rapid transit station in Shaker Heights, Ohio, US

Courtland
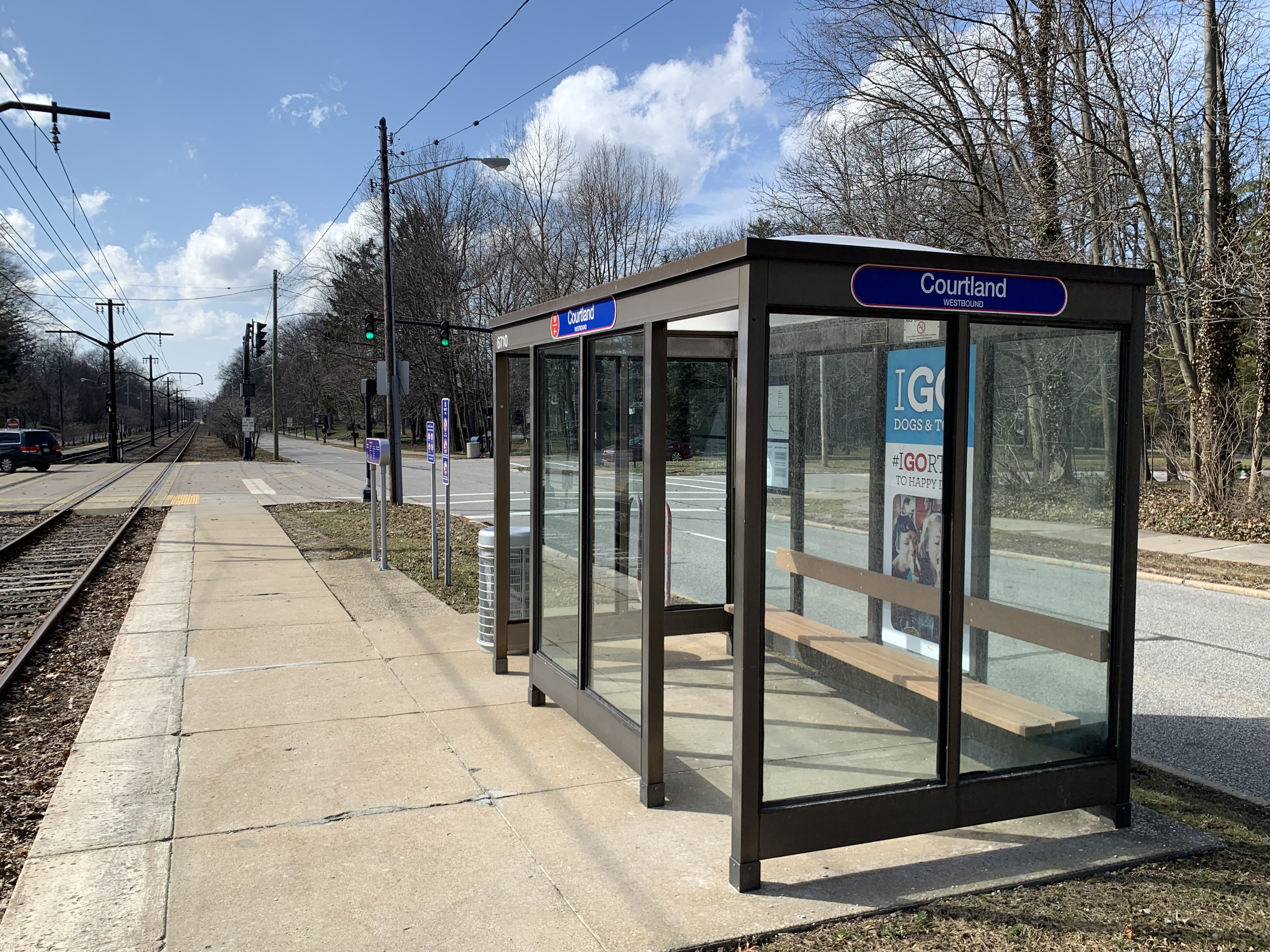
- Courtland station westbound platform in March 2022

General information
- Location: 19500 Shaker Boulevard; Shaker Heights, Ohio
- Coordinates: 41°28′43″N 81°32′36″W
- Owner: City of Shaker Heights
- Operator: Greater Cleveland Regional Transit Authority
- Line: Shaker Boulevard
- Platforms: 2 side platforms
- Tracks: 2

Construction
- Structure type: At-grade
- Cycle facilities: Racks
- Accessible: No

Other information
- Website: riderta.com/facilities/courtland

History
- Opened: May 20, 1915; 111 years ago
- Rebuilt: 1980
- Original company: Cleveland Railway

Services
Preceding station	Rapid Transit	Following station
Eaton toward Tower City	Green Line	Warrensville–Shaker toward Green Road
Former services
Preceding station	Cleveland Railway	Following station
Eaton toward Terminal Square	Shaker Line 1915–1930	Warrensville Opened 1928 Terminus
Eaton toward Terminal Square	Courtland Spur 1920–1923	Shaker Heights Country Club Until 1923 Terminus
Location

Courtland station is a stop on the RTA light rail Green Line in Shaker Heights, Ohio, located in the median of Shaker Boulevard (Ohio State Route 87) at its intersection with Courtland Boulevard, after which the station is named.

== History ==
The station opened on May 20, 1915, when rail service on what is now Shaker Boulevard was extended from Fontenay Road 3/5 mile (0.97 km) east to Courtland Boulevard. The extension included a wye extending southward on Courtland Boulevard to South Woodland Road to the entrance of the Shaker Heights Country Club. The new country club, which opened ten days later, was essentially a relocation of the Euclid Country Club, which was displaced from its location at the top of Cedar Glen Parkway when the Euclid Heights subdivision was developed. The rail line was built by Cleveland Interurban Railroad and initially operated by the Cleveland Railway.

In 1923, a station building with a passenger waiting room was constructed in the Shaker Boulevard median northeast of the Courtland Boulevard intersection. The building, costing US$8,150 (equivalent to $154,006 in 2025), was similar to, but smaller than, the building built at the same time and still standing at Lynnfield Road, which was then the end of the Van Aken line. The building also housed tobacco and newspaper stands with newspapers delivered to the station by rapid transit.

Also in 1923, most of the wye along Courtland Boulevard was abandoned, as the country club was generating little ridership. A short wye at Shaker Boulevard was retained to turn the cars around. In 1928, the line was extended east along Shaker Boulevard to Warrensville Center Road.

The station building received little use after the line was extended, and it was too small for other uses. Finally, the upkeep on the station was deemed too expensive so the station building was razed on October 15, 1967. There is no trace of the building today.

In 1980 and 1981, the Green and Blue Lines were completely renovated with new track, ballast, poles and wiring, and new stations were built along the line. The renovated line along Shaker Boulevard opened on October 11, 1980.

== Station layout ==
The station has two narrow side platforms, split across the intersection with Courtland Boulevard. Westbound trains stop at a platform with a small shelter east of the intersection before crossing Courtland. Eastbound trains stop at a platform west of the intersection before crossing. The station does not have ramps to allow passengers with disabilities to access trains.

== Notable places nearby ==
- Hathaway Brown School
- Shaker Heights Country Club
