= Belvoir station =

Rapid transit station in Cleveland

Belvoir
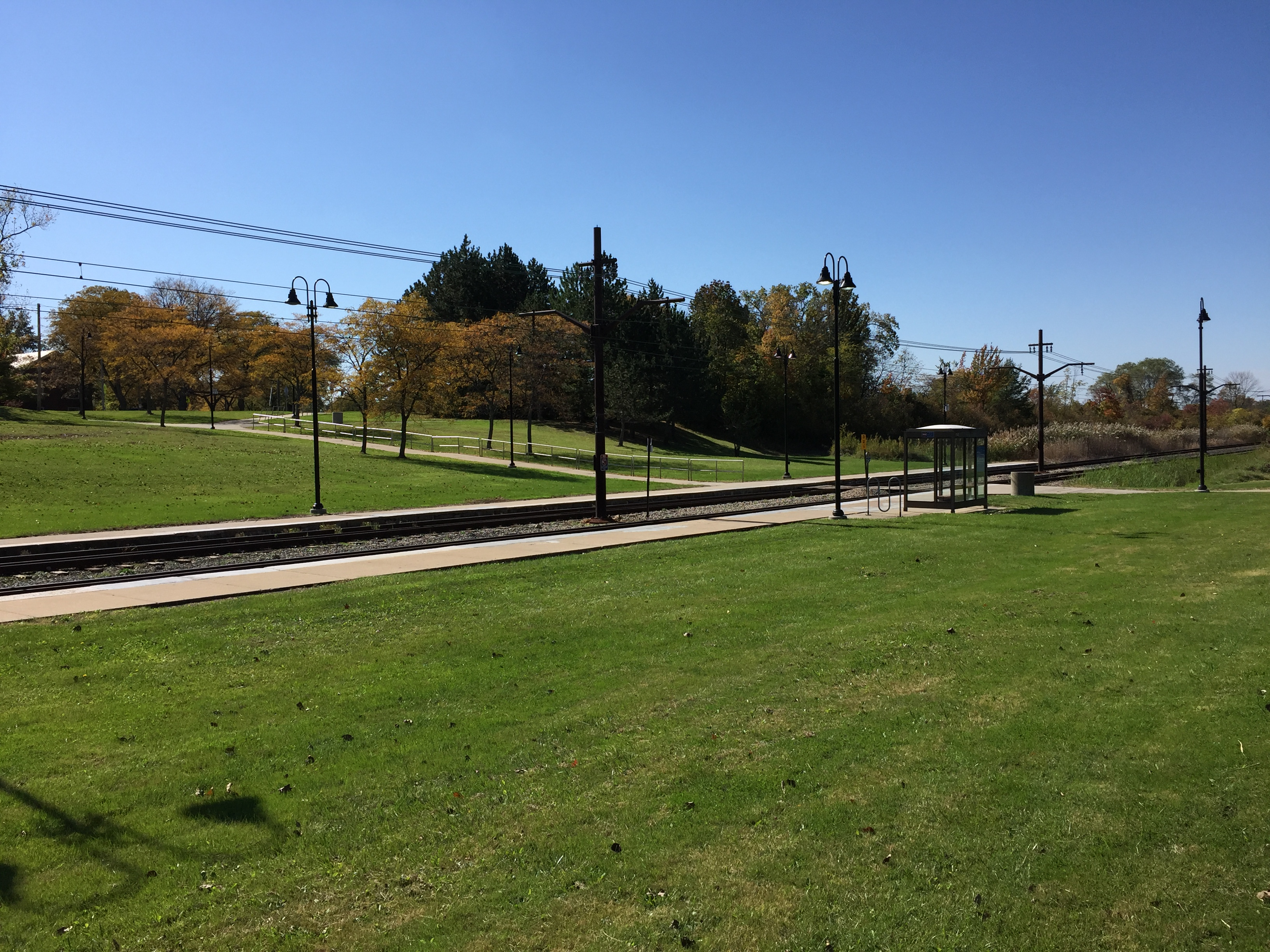
- Belvoir station platforms in October 2015

General information
- Location: 21601 Shaker Boulevard; Shaker Heights, Ohio
- Coordinates: 41°28′43″N 81°31′39″W
- Owner: City of Shaker Heights
- Operator: Greater Cleveland Regional Transit Authority
- Line: Shaker Boulevard
- Platforms: 2 side platforms
- Tracks: 2

Construction
- Structure type: At-grade
- Cycle facilities: Racks
- Accessible: No

Other information
- Website: riderta.com/facilities/belvoir

History
- Opened: November 1, 1936
- Rebuilt: 1980
- Original company: Cleveland Interurban Railroad

Services
Preceding station	Rapid Transit	Following station
Warrensville–Shaker toward Tower City	Green Line	West Green toward Green Road
Location

Belvoir station is a stop on the light rail Green Line of the RTA Rapid Transit in Shaker Heights, Ohio. It is located in the wide landscaped median of Shaker Boulevard (Ohio State Route 87) at the intersection of Belvoir Boulevard on the north side and Belvoir Oval on the south side.

== History ==
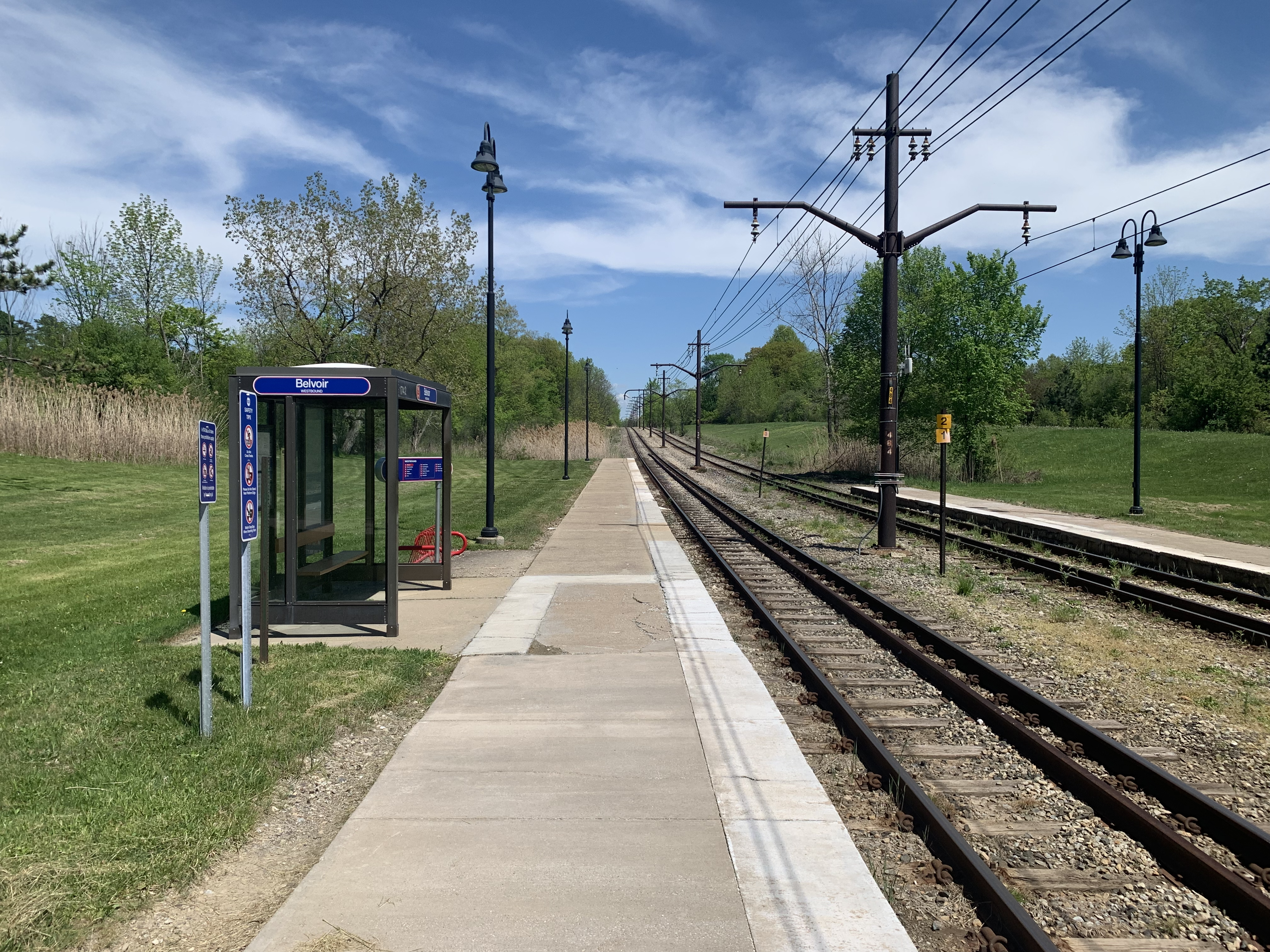
Belvoir station platform in 2022

The station opened in 1936 when the Cleveland Interurban Railroad, the predecessor of the Green Line, was extended one mile (1.6 km) east from Warrensville–Shaker station to Green Road station. This extension was also originally a single track, and a second track was added to the extension in 1942 when increased ridership during World War II made single-track operation no longer feasible.

In 1980 and 1981, the Green and Blue Lines were completely renovated with new track, ballast, poles and wiring, and new stations were built along the line. The renovated line along Shaker Boulevard opened on October 11, 1980.

== Station layout ==
The station comprises two side platforms located below street level. There is a small shelter on the westbound platform. Sloping sidewalks extend down to the station from each side of Shaker Boulevard. Belvoir Boulevard proper does not cross Shaker Boulevard, but these sidewalks provide pedestrian access.

== Notable places nearby ==
- John Carroll University
