= West Green station =

Rapid transit station in Cleveland

West Green
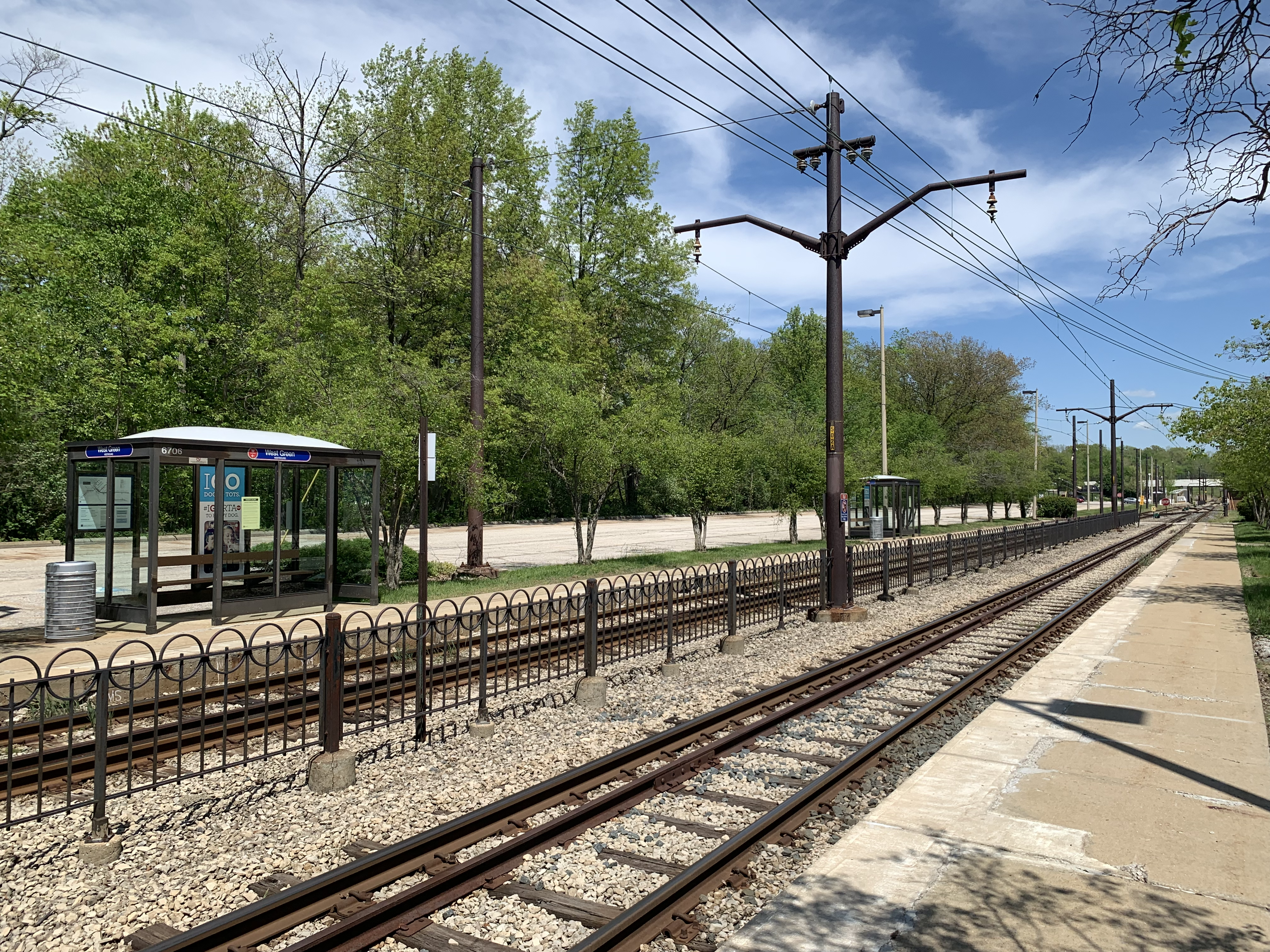
- West Green station platforms

General information
- Location: 22500 Shaker Boulevard; Shaker Heights, Ohio
- Coordinates: 41°28′43″N 81°31′14″W
- Owner: City of Shaker Heights
- Operator: Greater Cleveland Regional Transit Authority
- Line: Shaker Boulevard
- Platforms: 2 side platforms
- Tracks: 2

Construction
- Structure type: At-grade
- Parking: 820 spaces (shared with Green Road)
- Accessible: No

Other information
- Website: riderta.com/facilities/westgreen

History
- Opened: November 1, 1936; 89 years ago
- Rebuilt: 1980
- Original company: Cleveland Interurban Railroad

Services
| Preceding station | Rapid Transit | Following station |
|---|---|---|
| Belvoir toward Tower City | Green Line | Green Road Terminus |
Location

West Green station is a station on the Green Line of the RTA Rapid Transit in Shaker Heights, Ohio. It is located at the western end of the parking lot shared with Green Road station, only 150 yards (140 m) west of Green Road platforms. The station is designed to provide convenient boarding for riders who park in the western end of the parking area.

== History ==
The station opened when the rapid transit line was extended 1 mile (1.6 km) east from Warrensville Center Road to Green Road. The extension was originally single-track. A second track was added to the extension in 1942 when increased ridership during World War II made single-track operation no longer feasible.

In 1980 and 1981, the Green and Blue Lines were completely renovated with new track, ballast, poles and wiring, and new stations were built along the line. The renovated line along Shaker Boulevard opened on October 11, 1980.

== Station layout ==
The station consists of two side platforms with two small shelters on the westbound platform. There is no entrance to the station other than through the parking area that it shares with Green Road station.

== Notable places nearby ==
- Laurel School
- Beachwood High School
