= RTA Rapid Transit =

Public transit network in Cleveland, Ohio

RTA Rapid

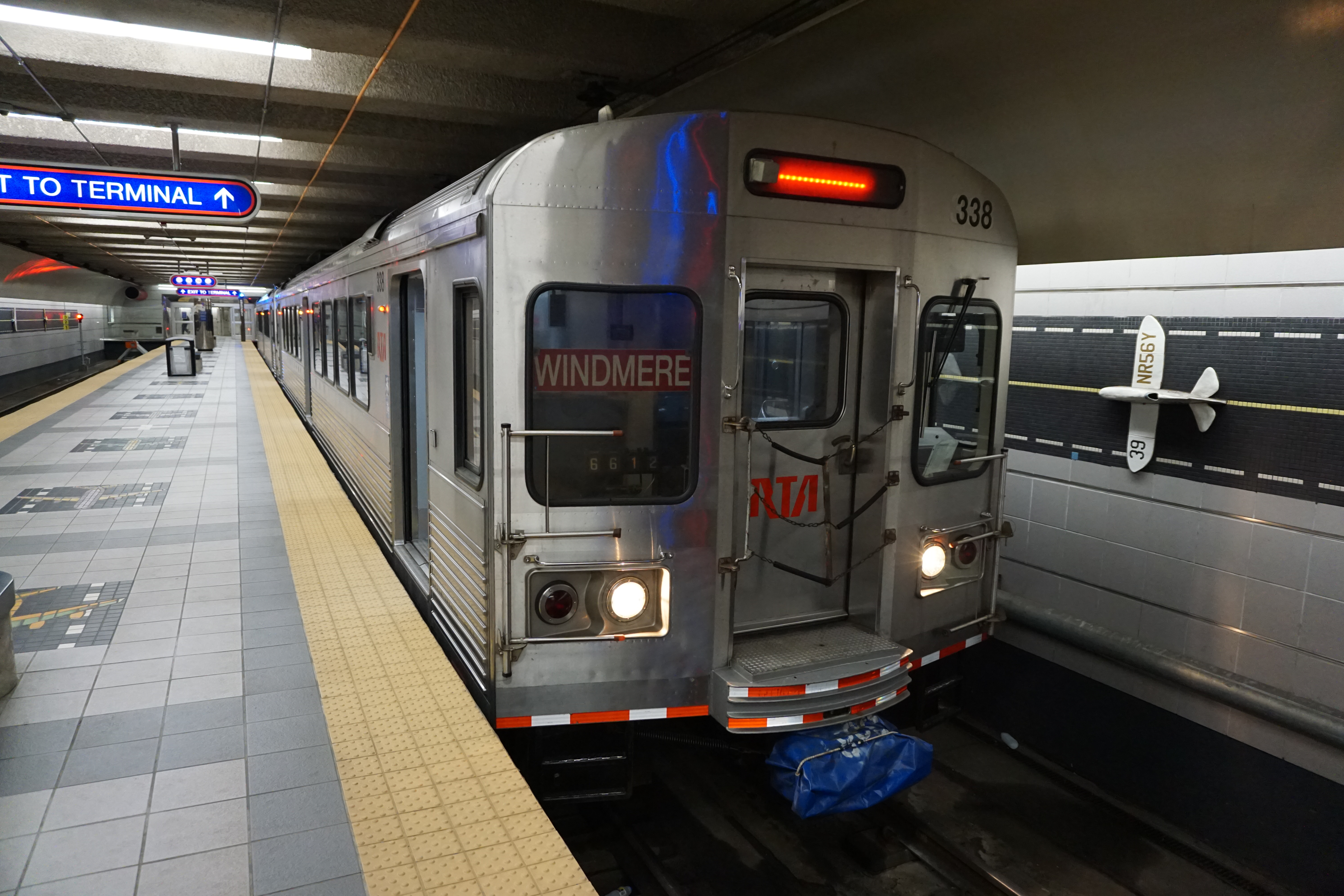
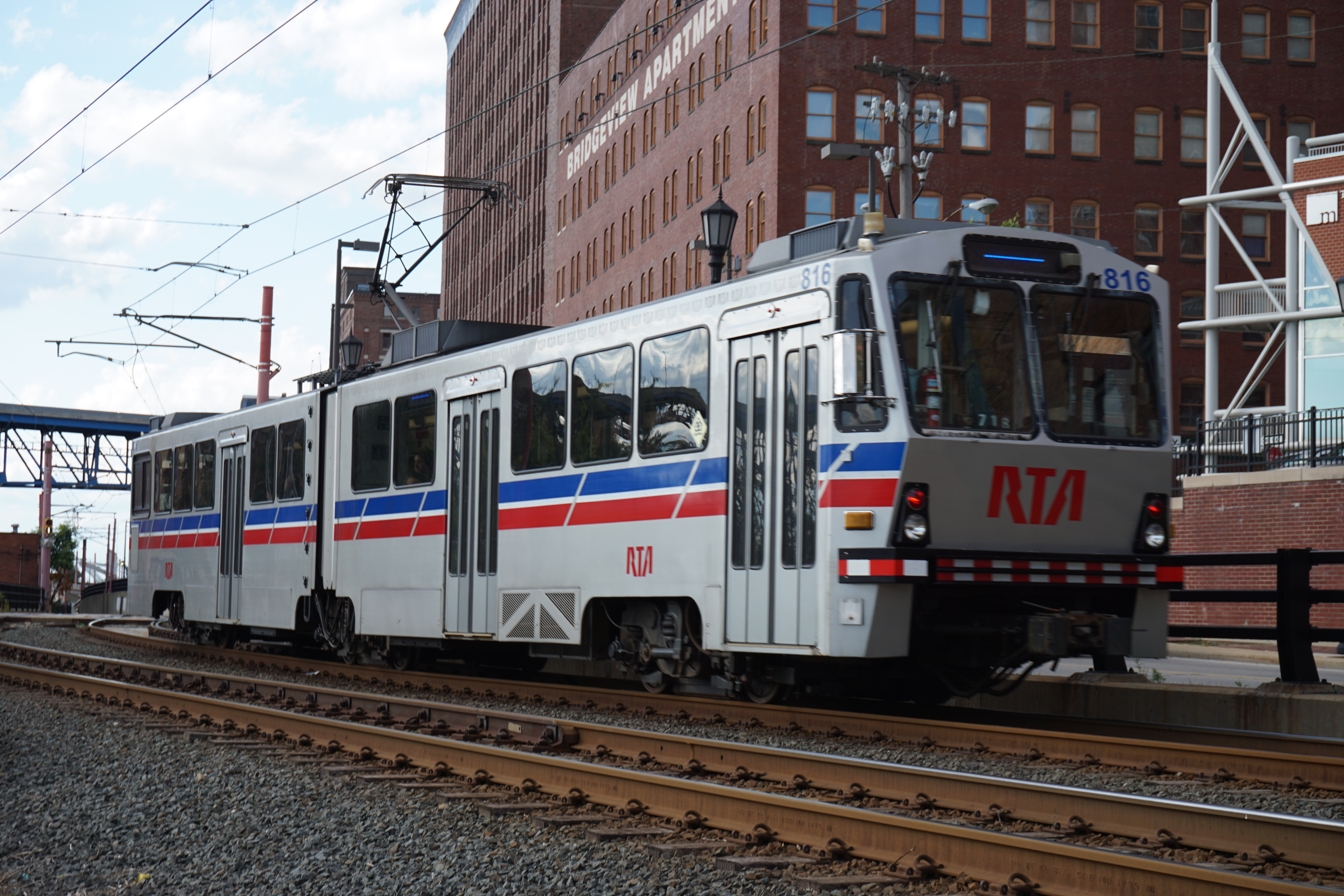
- RTA Rapid Transit heavy rail (left) and light rail (right) trains

Overview
- Owner: Greater Cleveland Regional Transit Authority
- Locale: Cuyahoga County, Ohio, U.S.
- Transit type: Rapid transit Light rail
- Number of lines: 1 rapid transit: Red; 3 light rail: Blue, Green, Waterfront
- Number of stations: 18 rapid transit 34 light rail
- Daily ridership: 9,300 (rapid transit, weekdays, Q2 2026); 2,300 (light rail, weekdays, Q2 2026)
- Annual ridership: 2,860,500 (rapid transit, 2025); 757,700 (light rail, 2025)

Operation
- Began operation: October 25, 1859; 167 years ago (first streetcar line); December 17, 1913; 112 years ago (current lines); March 15, 1955; 71 years ago (rapid transit); October 11, 1980; 46 years ago (light rail)
- Ended operation: October 30, 1981; 45 years ago (last streetcar use)
- Number of vehicles: 40 rapid transit cars 34 light rail cars

Technical
- System length: 19 mi (31 km) rapid transit 18 mi (29 km) light rail
- Track gauge: 4 ft 8 1/2 in (1,435 mm) standard gauge
System map
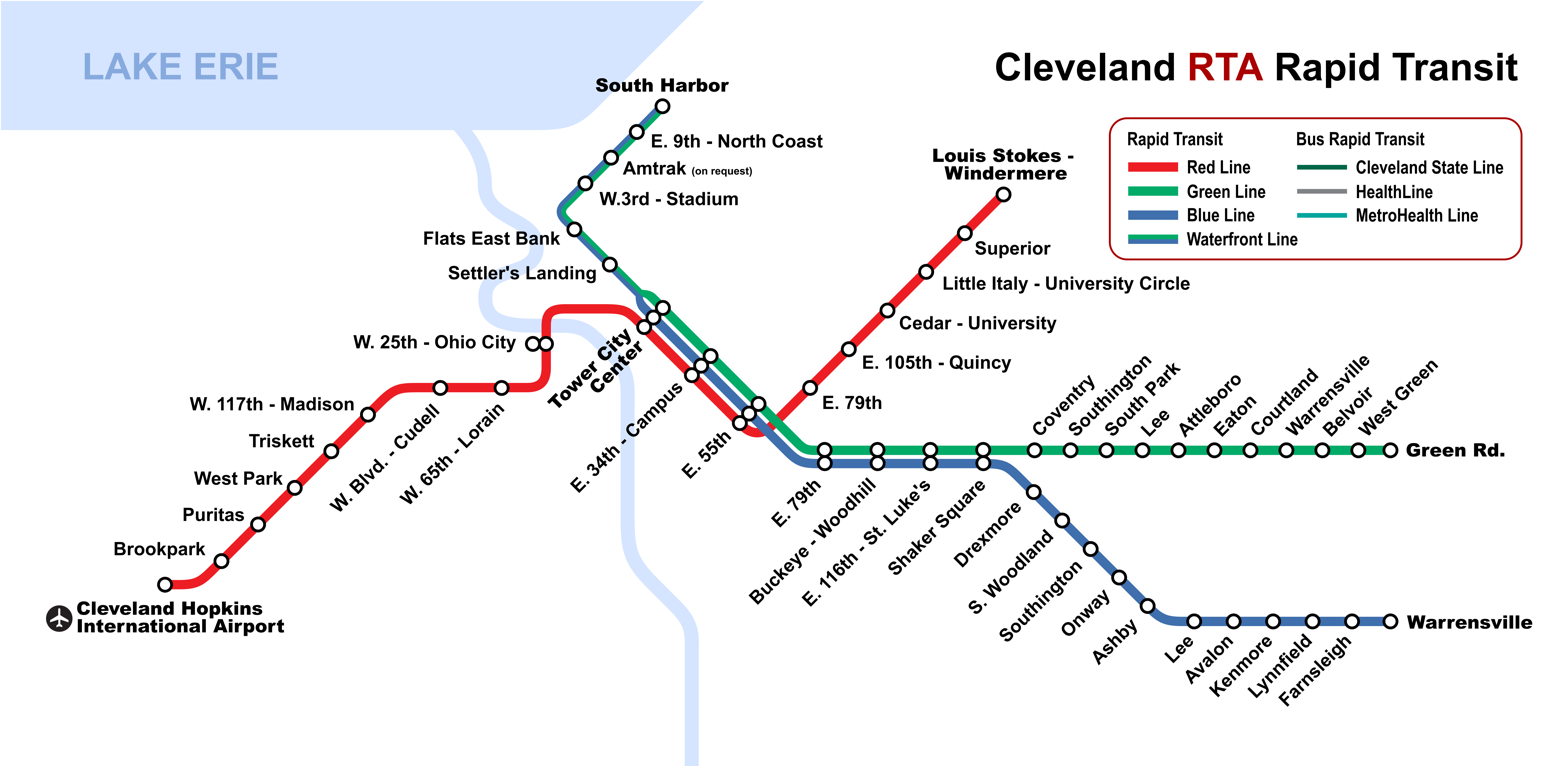

RTA Rapid (generally known as The Rapid) is a rapid transit and light rail system owned and operated by the Greater Cleveland Regional Transit Authority. The system serves Cleveland and surrounding areas in Cuyahoga County, Ohio. It consists of four total service lines: one rapid transit rail line and three light rail lines.

== Rail lines ==
The four rail lines join at Tower City Center in downtown Cleveland, on the platform level of the former Cleveland Union Terminal.

Three rail lines share their tracks at Tri-C–Campus District and East 55th stations. This sharing of one route by light and heavy rail trains is quite unusual. The shared stations have connected platforms of two heights to accommodate the two kinds of trains. And the two types of trains both use the same maintenance facility since they both use the same track gauge and same source of power (overhead catenary).

=== Red Line ===
The Red Line, a heavy-rail route, runs in both directions on fully grade-separated rights-of-way built from 1955 to 1968. It serves Cleveland's southwest suburbs, with its southwestern terminus at Cleveland Hopkins International Airport. Heading northeast, the Red Line serves University Circle before heading to its northeastern terminus at the Louis Stokes Station at Windermere in East Cleveland.

=== Blue, Green, and Waterfront Lines ===
The Blue and Green light-rail lines (alternatively known as the RTA Shaker Rapid) were built from 1913 to 1936 as grade-separated lines closer to downtown and surface lines along street medians in the streetcar suburb of Shaker Heights.

The two lines diverge at Shaker Square, a historic mixed-use community in Cleveland proper, just west of the Shaker Heights border. The Blue Line veers southeast along Van Aken Boulevard until reaching its terminus near the intersection of Warrensville Center Road and Chagrin Boulevard (U.S. Route 422 and State Route 8). The Green Line continues due east along Shaker Boulevard (State Route 87) until reaching its terminus at the intersection of Green Road.

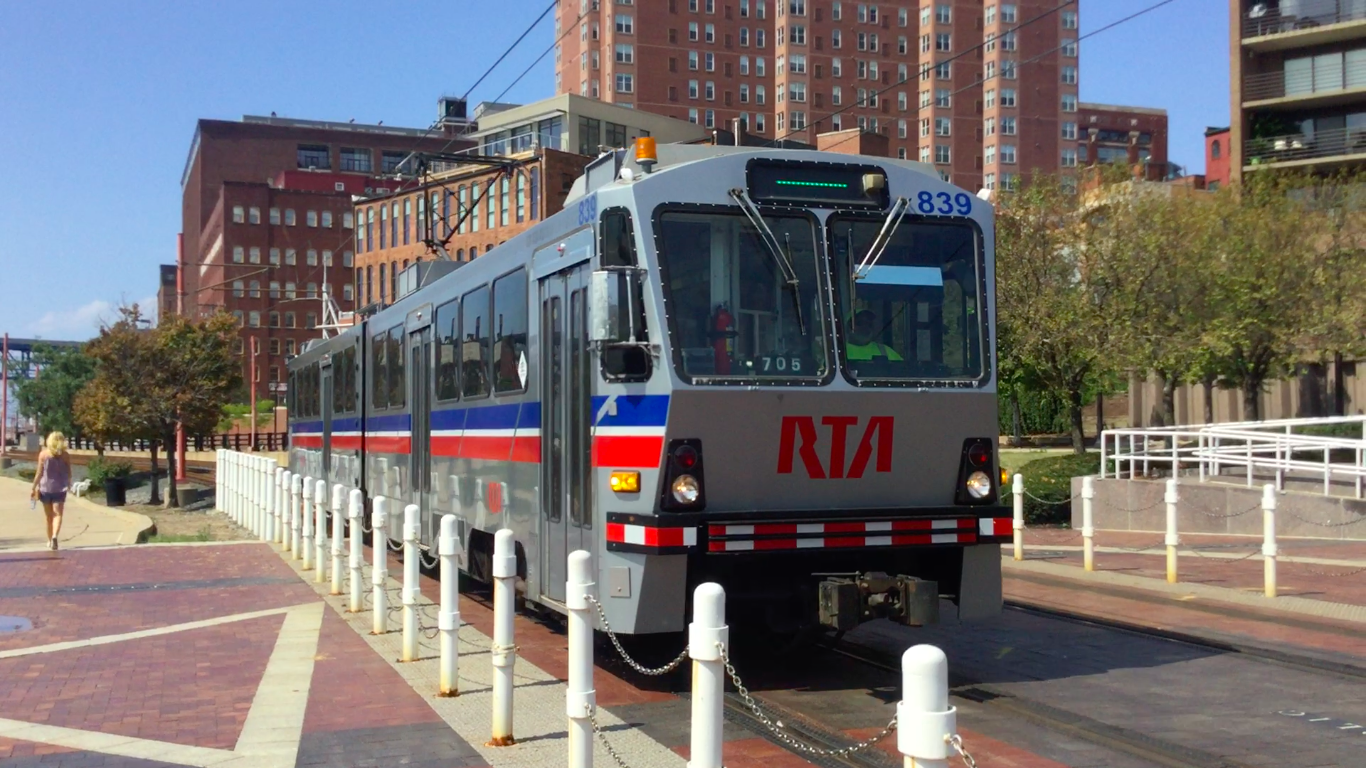
Light rail vehicle on the Waterfront Line

The Waterfront Line, opened in 1996, extends the Blue and Green Lines from Tower City north through The Flats. It then travels northeast along the shoreline of Lake Erie, servicing the local Amtrak station and terminates at the Lakefront Municipal lot. The Waterfront light rail line provides access from Tower City Center to the Flats, Cleveland Browns Stadium, the Great Lakes Science Center, the Rock and Roll Hall of Fame, and Burke Lakefront Airport.

== Stations ==
Cleveland Rapid Transit, 1913–present

The RTA Rapid Transit system consists of a total of 47 stations. The stations are fully or partially within the city limits of Cleveland, Shaker Heights, East Cleveland, and Brook Park.

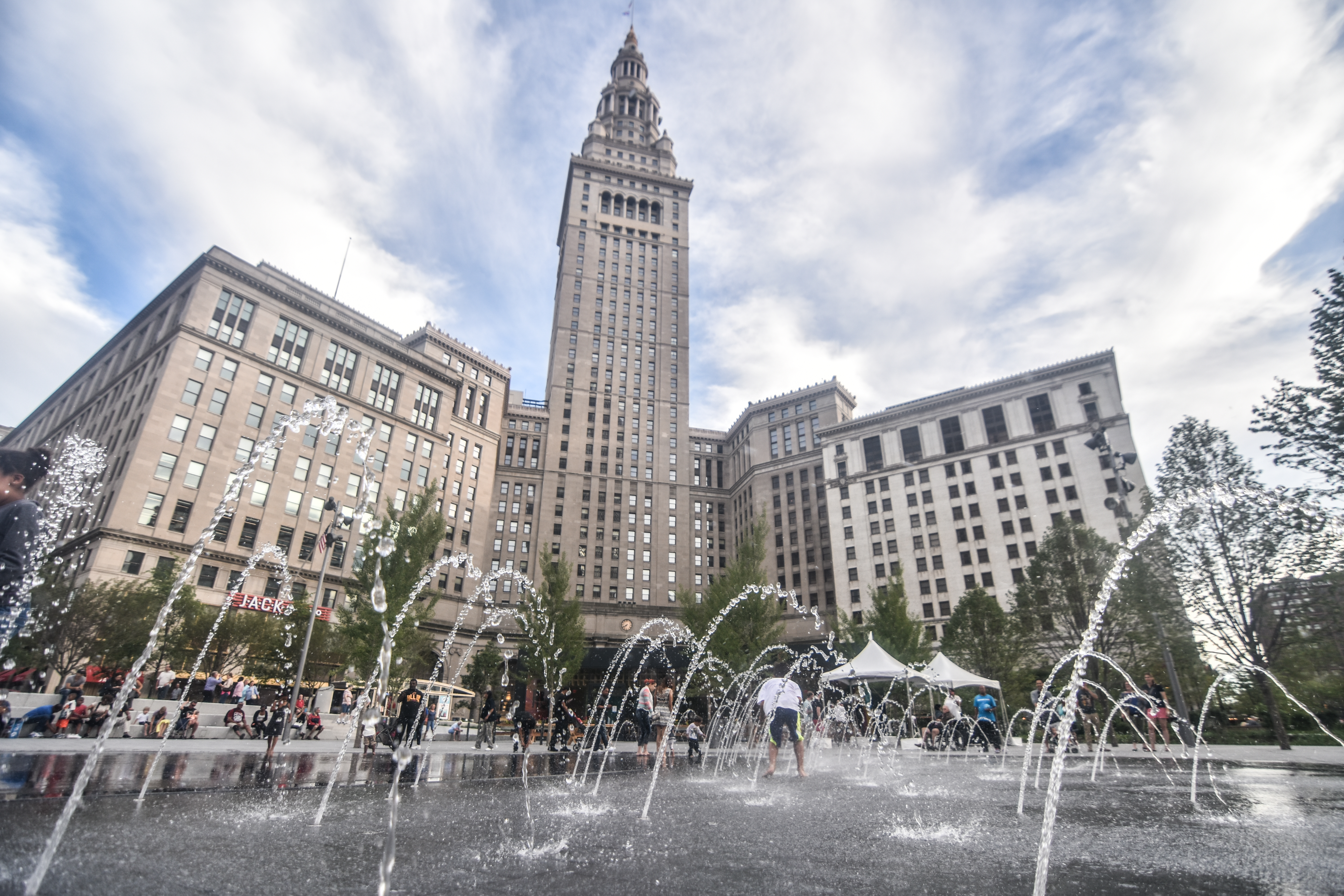
Tower City on the Red, Blue, Green, and Waterfront Lines

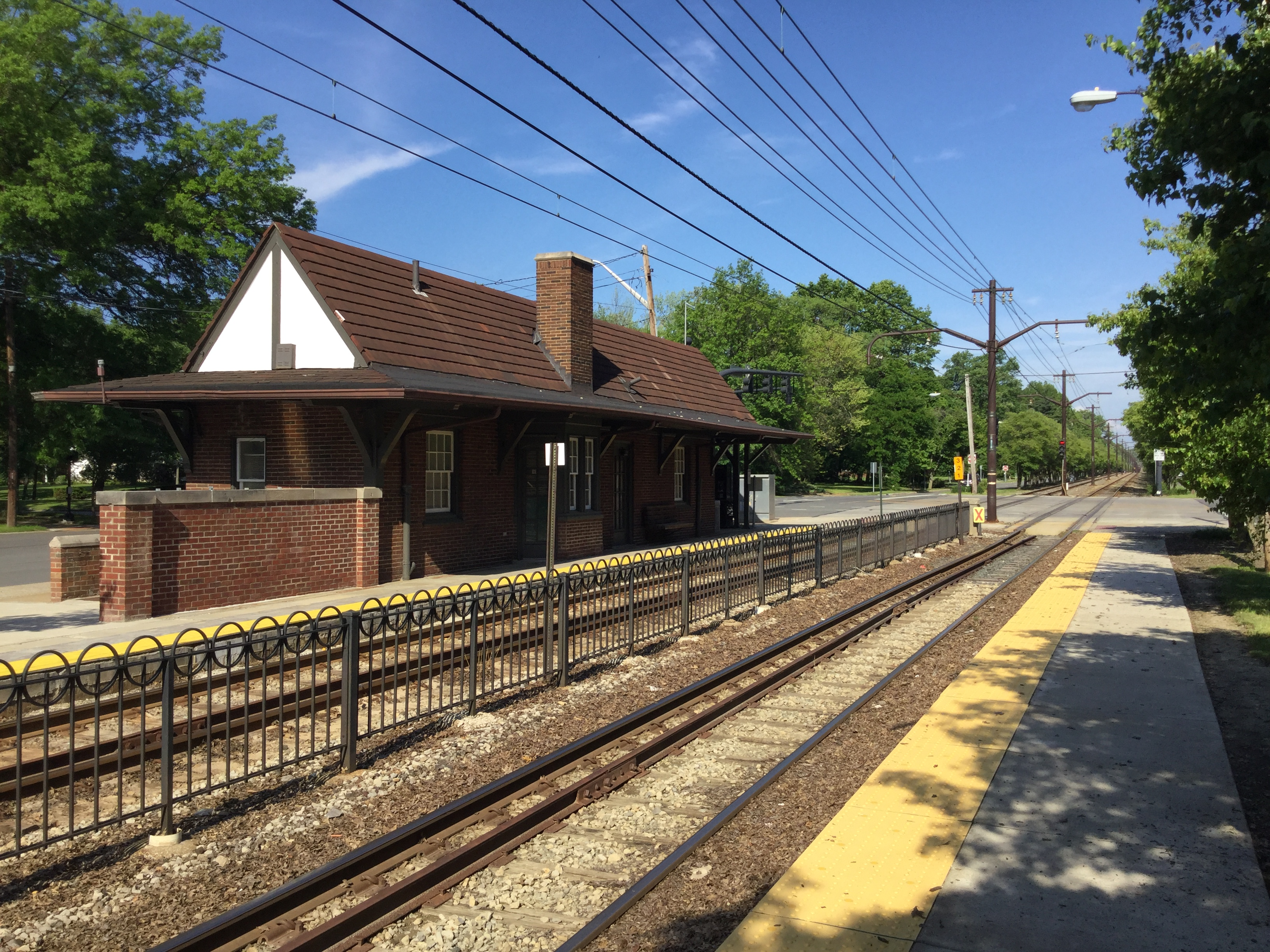
Coventry on the Green Line

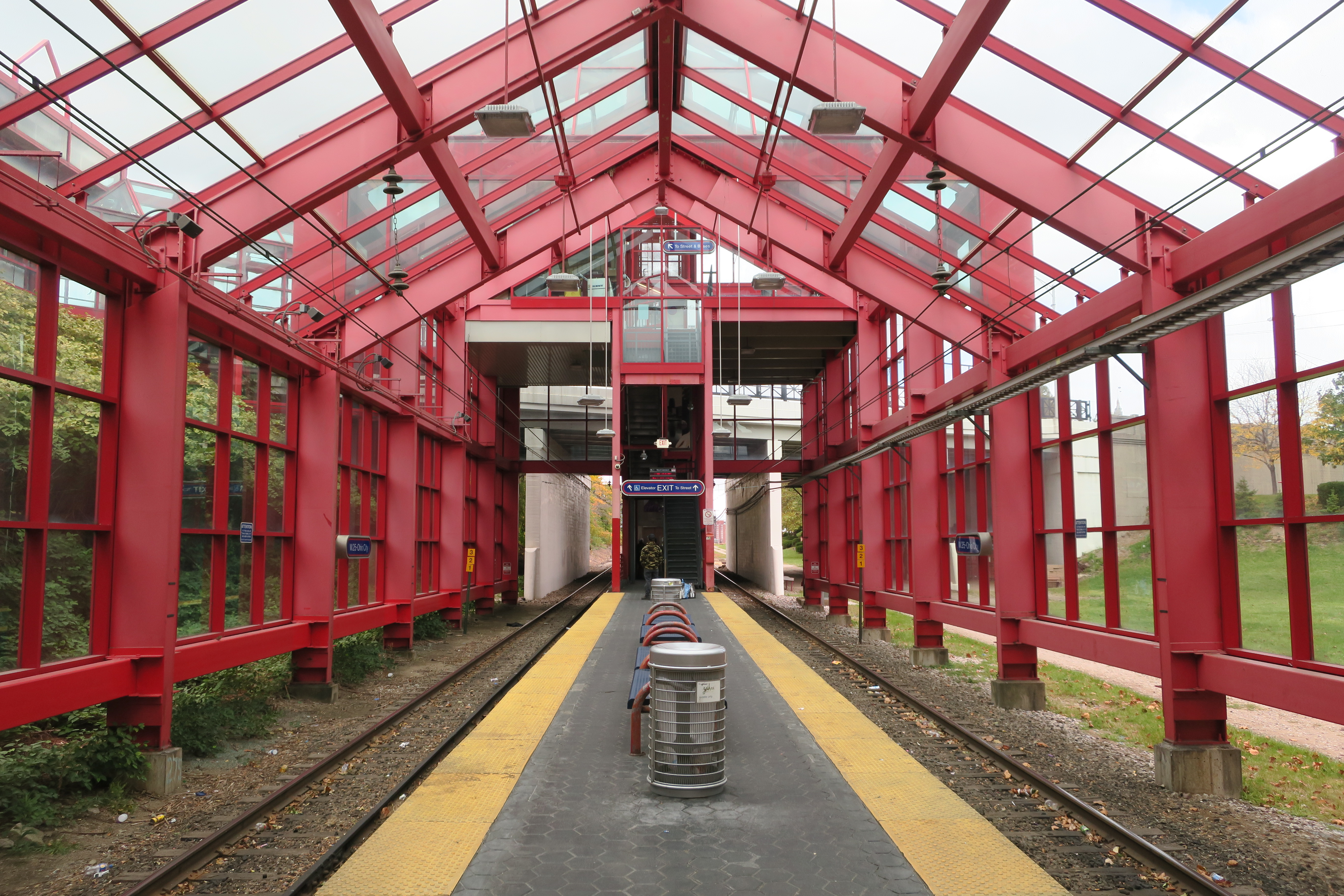
West 25th on the Red Line

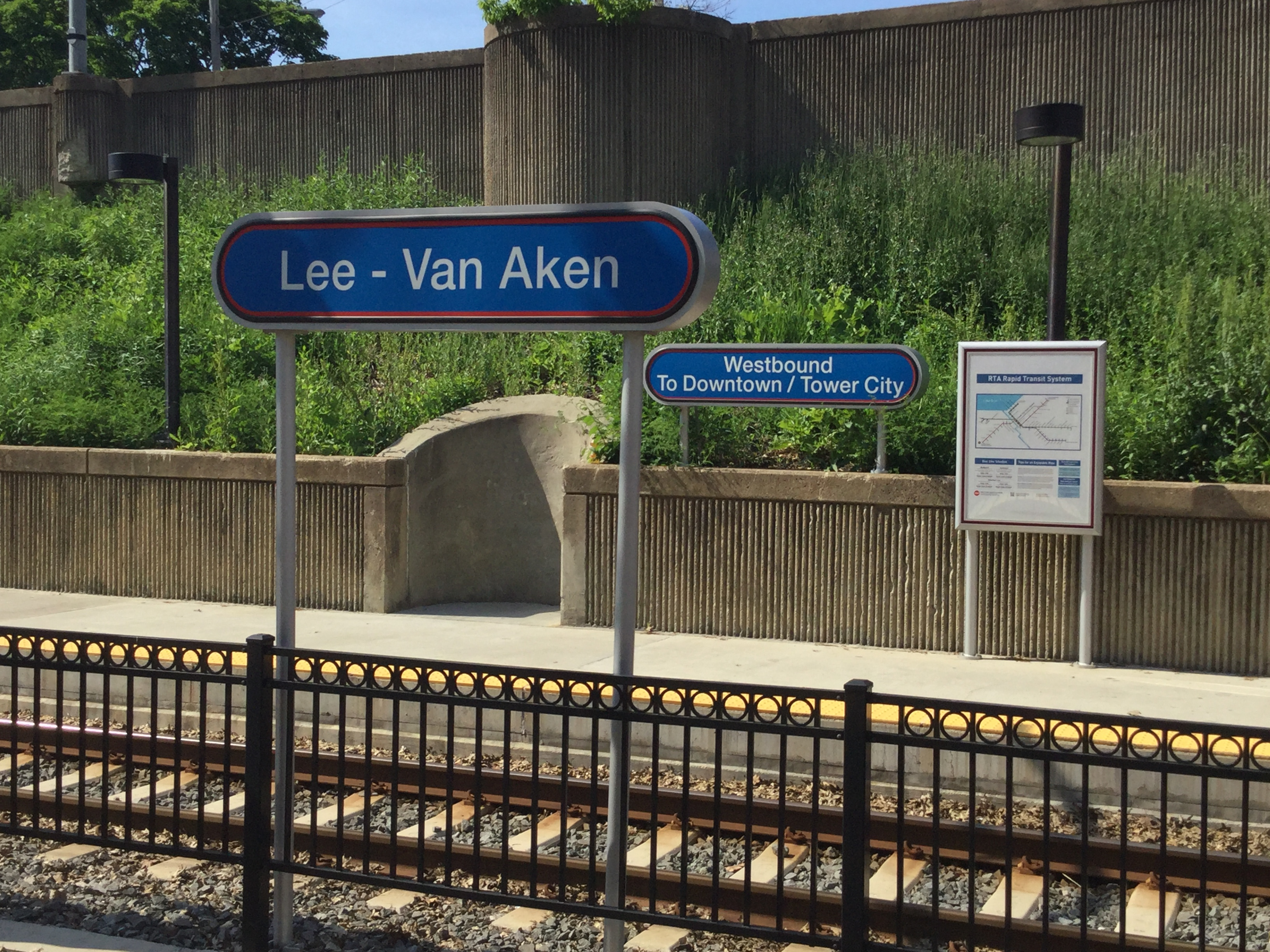
Lee-Van Aken on the Blue Line

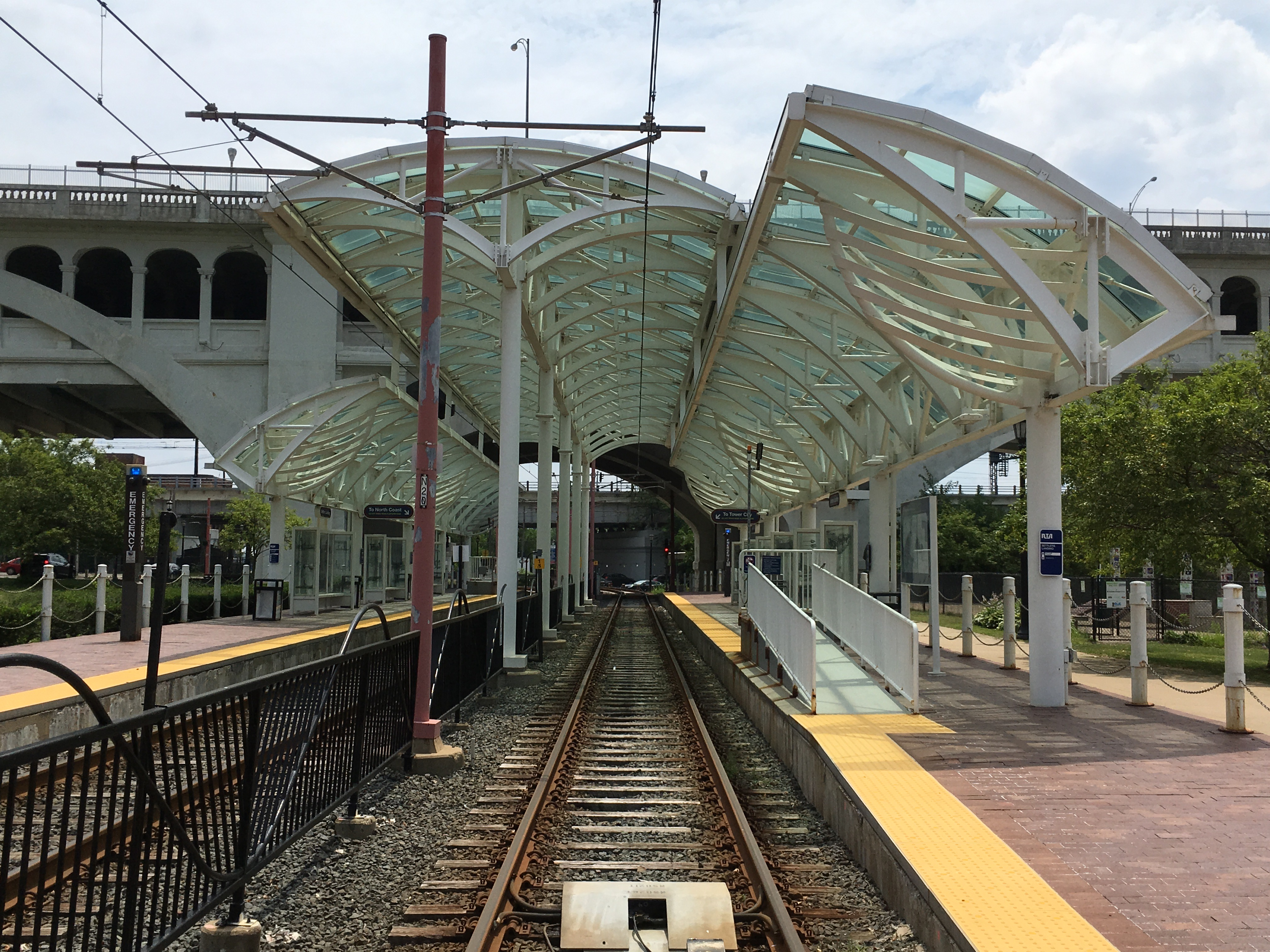
Settlers Landing on the Waterfront Line

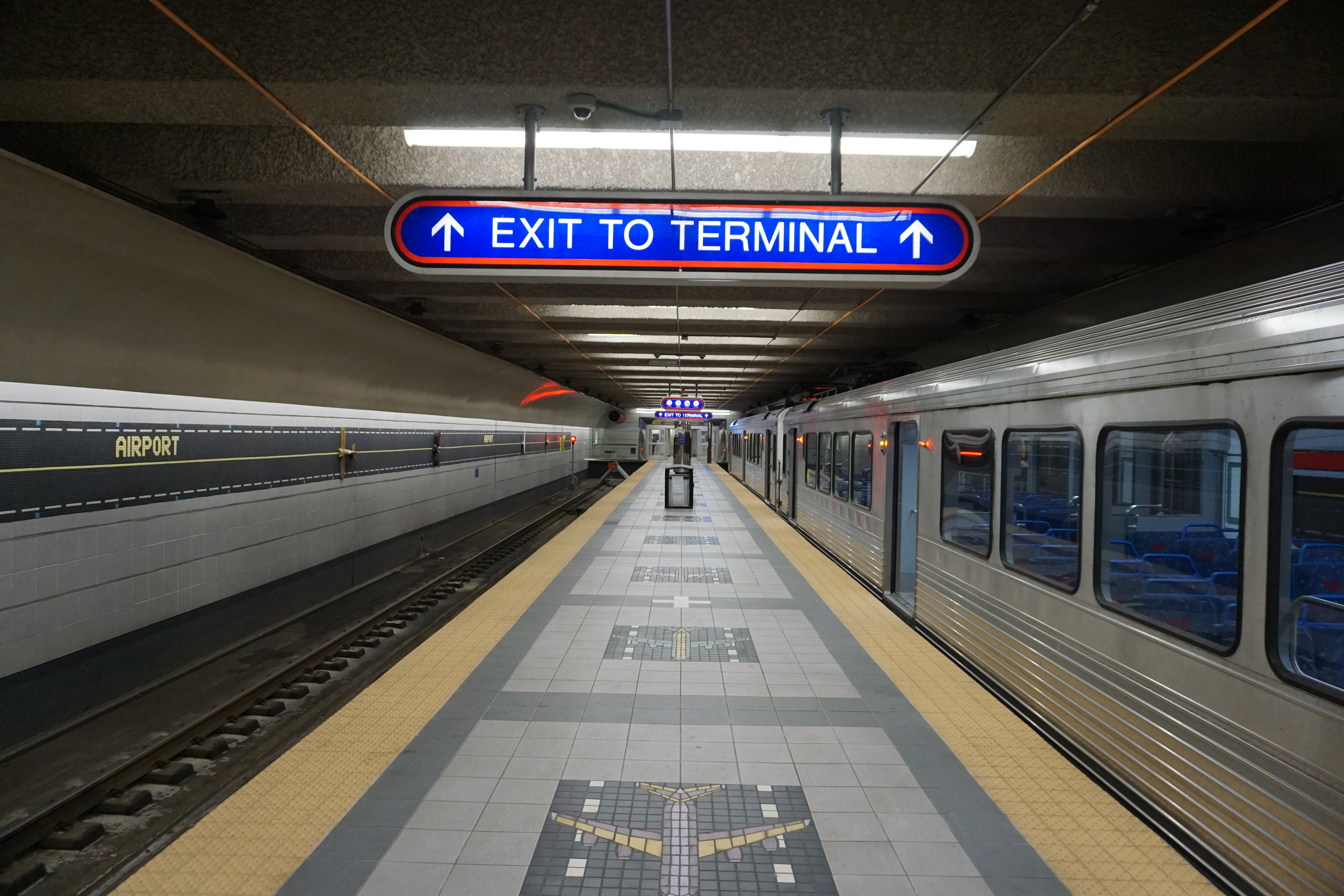
Airport on the Red Line

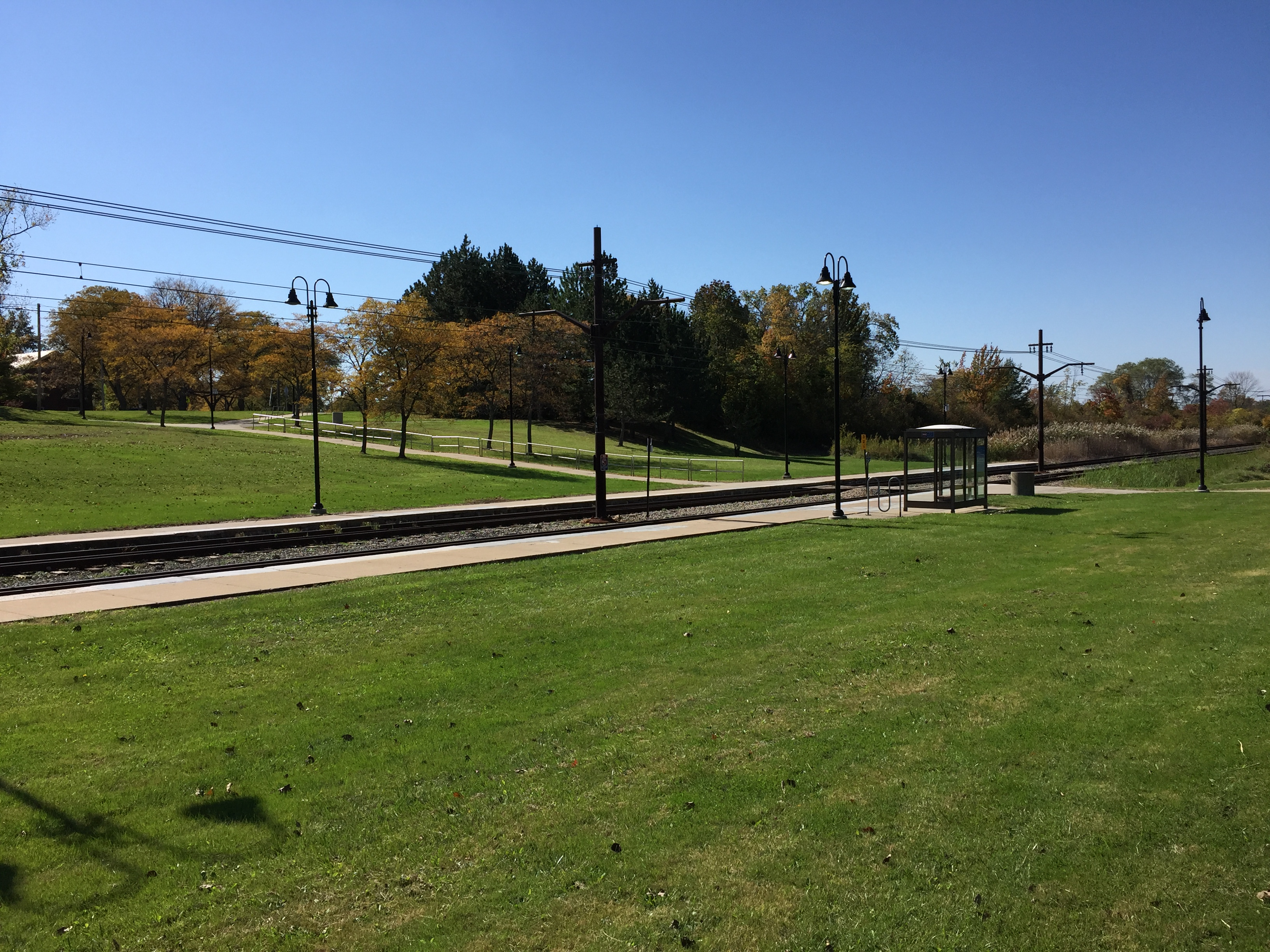
Belvoir on the Green Line

†*	Terminus and transfer stations
†	Terminal stations
*	Transfer stations
	Closed stations

Station	Rapid Transit lines	Jurisdiction	Opened	Rebuilt	ADA access
Airport†	Red	Cleveland	1968	1994	1994
Amtrak	Waterfront	Cleveland	1997		
Ashby	Blue	Shaker Heights	1920	1981	
Attleboro	Green	Shaker Heights	1913	1980	
Avalon	Blue	Shaker Heights	1920	1981	
Belvoir	Green	Shaker Heights	1936	1980	
Brookpark	Red	Cleveland / Brook Park	1969	2017	2003
Buckeye–Woodhill*	Blue Green	Cleveland	1920	1981, 2012	2012
Cedar–University	Red	Cleveland	1955	2014	2002
Courtland	Green	Shaker Heights	1915	1980	
Coventry	Green	Cleveland / Shaker Heights	1913	1980	
Drexmore	Blue	Cleveland	1948	1981	
East 9th–North Coast	Waterfront	Cleveland	1996		1996
East 55th*	Red Blue Green	Cleveland	1920	2011	2011
East 79th	Red	Cleveland	1955	2021	2021
East 79th*	Blue Green	Cleveland	1920	1981	
East 105th–Quincy	Red	Cleveland	1955	2005	2005
East 116th–St. Luke's*	Blue Green	Cleveland	1920	1981, 2019	2019
Eaton	Green	Shaker Heights	1915	1980	
Euclid–East 120th	Red	Cleveland	1955		
Farnsleigh	Blue	Shaker Heights	1930	1981, 2019	2019
Flats East Bank	Waterfront	Cleveland	1996		1996
Green Road†	Green	Shaker Heights	1936	1980, 1988	2001
Kenmore	Blue	Shaker Heights	1920	1981	
Lee–Shaker	Green	Shaker Heights	1913	1980, 2017	2017
Lee–Van Aken	Blue	Shaker Heights	1920	1981, 2015	2015
Little Italy–University Circle	Red	Cleveland	2015		2015
Lynnfield	Blue	Shaker Heights	1920	1981	
Onaway	Blue	Shaker Heights	1920	1980	
Puritas–West 150th	Red	Cleveland	1968	2011	2011
Settlers Landing	Waterfront	Cleveland	1996		1996
Shaker Square*	Blue Green	Cleveland	1920	1986	2006
South Harbor†	Waterfront	Cleveland	1996		1996
South Park	Green	Shaker Heights	1913	1980	
South Woodland	Blue	Cleveland / Shaker Heights	1920	1981	
Southington	Blue	Shaker Heights	1920	1980	
Southington	Green	Shaker Heights	1913	1981	
Superior	Red	East Cleveland	1955	1996	1996
Tower City†*	Red Blue Green Waterfront	Cleveland	1930	1990	1990
Tri-C–Campus District*	Red Blue Green	Cleveland	1930	2003, 2018	2018
Triskett	Red	Cleveland	1958	2000	2000
Warrensville–Shaker	Green	Shaker Heights	1928	1980, 2016	2016
Warrensville–Van Aken†	Blue	Shaker Heights	1930	1981, 1999	1999
West 3rd	Waterfront	Cleveland	1999		1999
West 25th–Ohio City	Red	Cleveland	1955	1992	1992
West 65th–Lorain	Red	Cleveland	1955	2004	2004
West 117th–Madison	Red	Cleveland	1955	2007	2007
West Boulevard–Cudell	Red	Cleveland	1955	1999	1999
West Green	Green	Shaker Heights	1936	1980	
West Park	Red	Cleveland	1958	1996	1996
Windermere†*	Red	East Cleveland	1955	1997	1997

Note: Euclid–East 120th Street station closed in 2015 and was replaced by Little Italy–University Circle station.

== See also ==
- List of metro systems
- List of light rail transit systems
- List of rail transit systems in the United States
- List of Ohio train stations
