= Buckeye–Woodhill station =

Rapid transit station in Cleveland

Buckeye Woodhill
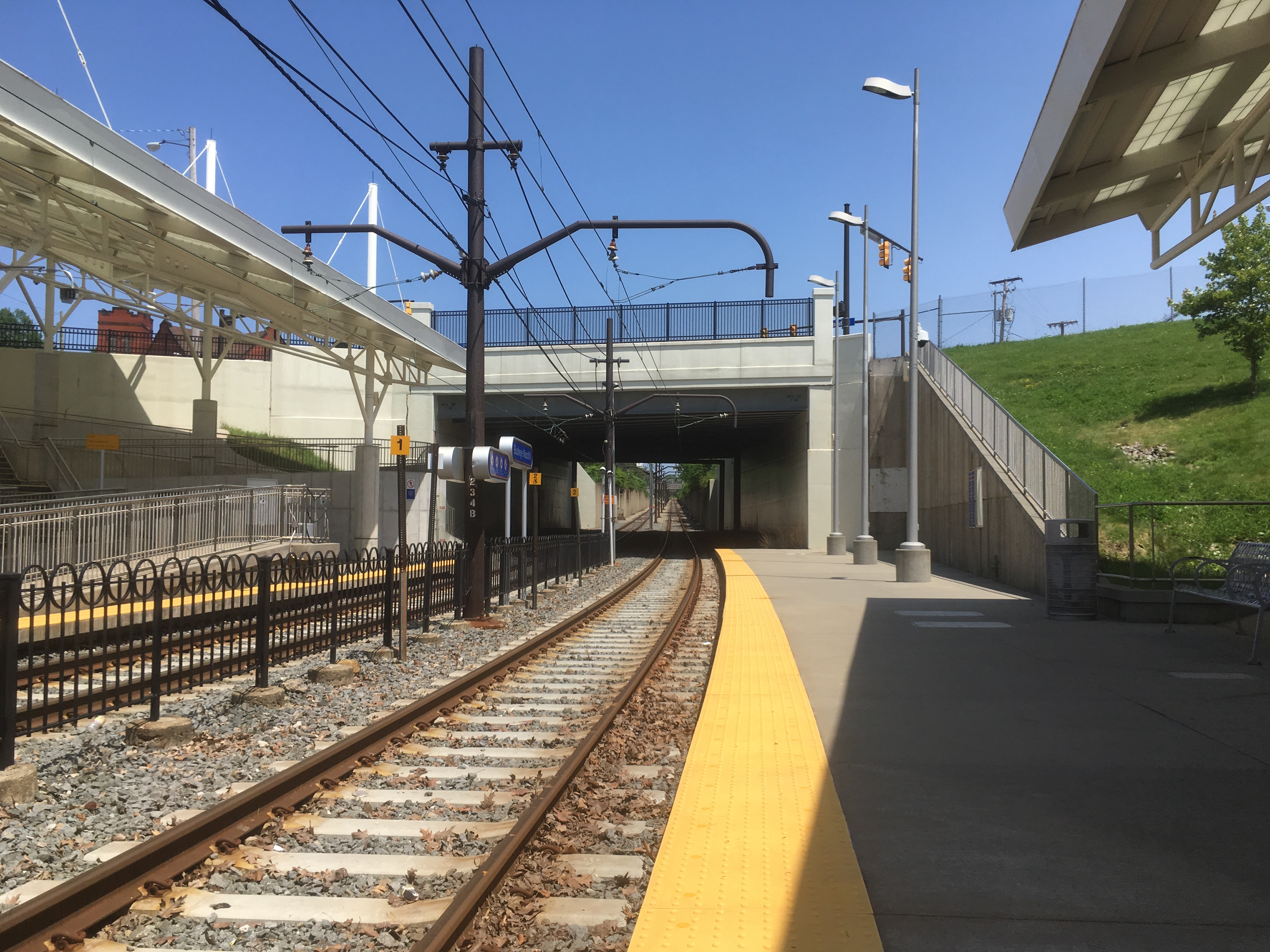
- Buckeye–Woodhill station platform after reconstruction in June 2019

General information
- Location: 9528 Buckeye Road; Cleveland, Ohio
- Coordinates: 41°28′58″N 81°37′7″W
- Owner: Greater Cleveland Regional Transit Authority
- Platforms: 2 side platforms
- Tracks: 2
- Connections: RTA: 8, 10

Construction
- Structure type: Below-grade
- Parking: 60 spaces
- Cycle facilities: Racks
- Accessible: Yes

Other information
- Website: riderta.com/facilities/buckeyewoodhill

History
- Opened: April 11, 1920; 106 years ago
- Rebuilt: 1981, 2012
- Former names: Woodhill (1920–2012)
- Original company: Cleveland Interurban Railroad

Services
Preceding station	Rapid Transit	Following station
East 79th toward Tower City	Blue Line	East 116th–St. Luke's toward Warrensville–Van Aken
East 79th toward Tower City	Green Line	East 116th–St. Luke's toward Green Road
Location

Buckeye–Woodhill station is a station on the RTA Blue and Green Lines in Cleveland, Ohio. To the east of this station, the line enters the median of Shaker Boulevard (Ohio State Route 87). It is located below the intersection of Shaker Boulevard with Buckeye Road and Woodhill Road, after which the station is named.

== History ==
The station opened on April 11, 1920, as Woodhill, when service commenced on the line west of Shaker Square to East 34th Street and via surface streets to downtown.

The station was located at the mouth of a cut over one mile (1.6 km) in length from Shaker Square. The cut averages 25 feet (7.6 m) in-depth, but just before Buckeye–Woodhill it is up to 40 feet (12 m) deep, with a 2.44 percent incline down from the Shaker Square (the steepest grade on the line). The line was constructed with a tunnel under the intersection of Buckeye and Woodhill Roads, which was built without disturbing the automobile and streetcar traffic above. The location of the tunnel dictated the placement of the line.

The material excavated from the cut was used to create an embankment to carry the tracks over the railroad tracks and streets west of Buckeye–Woodhill. The embankment is high as 50 feet (15 m) at places. The cut and fill provide the means for the trains to traverse the Portage Escarpment that separates much of the city of Cleveland from suburbs such as Shaker Heights and Cleveland Heights.

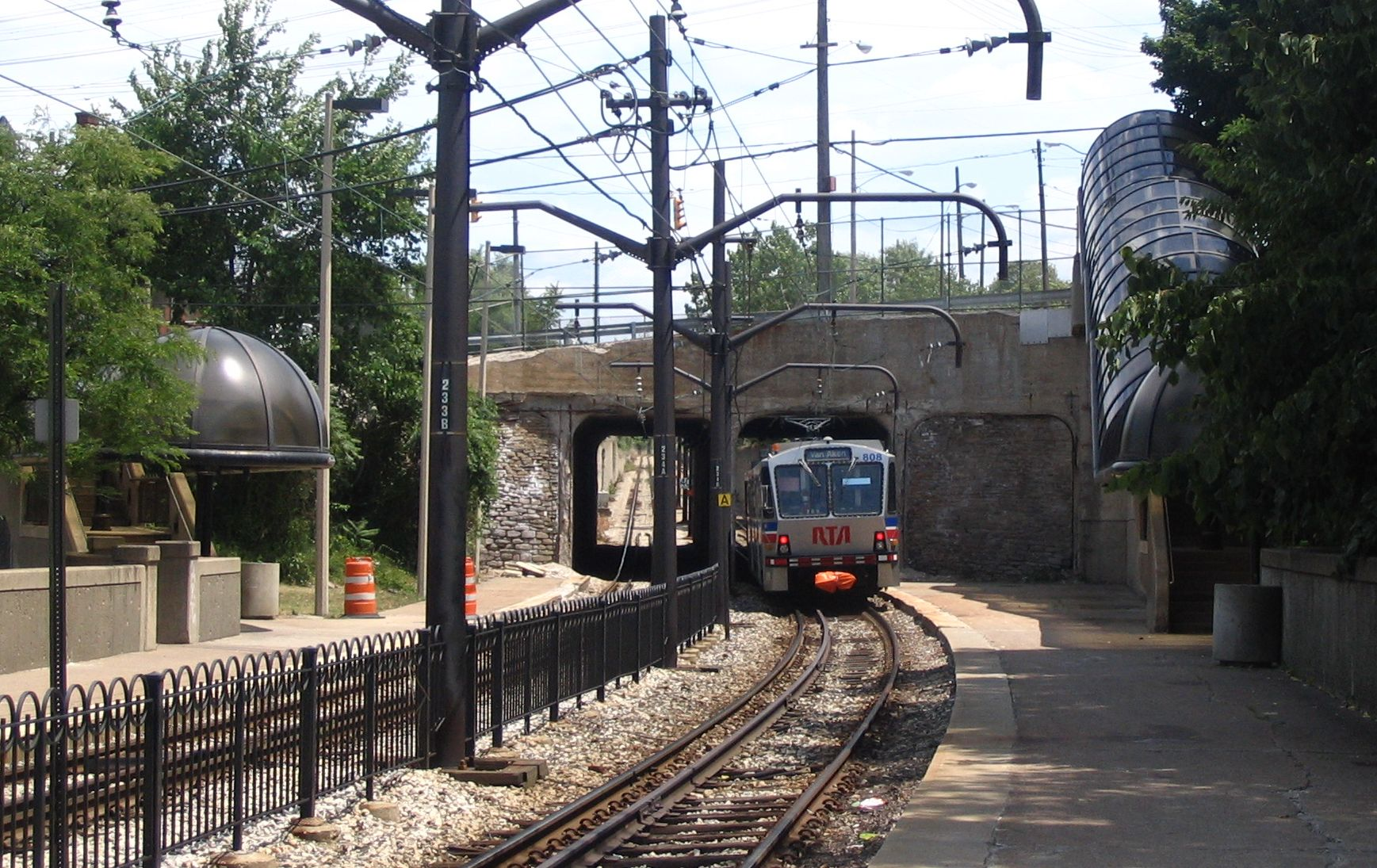
The station in July 2007.

In 1980 and 1981, the trunk line of the Green and Blue Lines from East 55th Street to Shaker Square was completely renovated with new track, ballast, poles and wiring, and new stations were built along the line. At Buckeye–Woodhill, new platforms were installed, and the wooden stairways were replaced by concrete stairways covered by tinted acrylic glass canopies. The renovated line opened on October 30, 1981.

Between 2011 and 2012, the RTA renovated Buckeye–Woodhill once more with funding received as part of the American Recovery and Reinvestment Act. The platforms were renovated with tactile edges installed, the covered stairways were replaced with ones of a more contemporary design and appearance and new wheelchair ramps were installed, making the station accessible. The rebuilt station was dedicated on October 23, 2012.

== Station layout ==
The station has two side platforms located below-grade west of the intersection. Two concrete stairways, one on the north from Buckeye Road and the second on the south from Woodhill Road, lead down to the platforms. There is a small park and ride lot north of the platforms off Buckeye Road. Each platform has a large glass shelter along with a mini-high platform, which allows passengers with disabilities to access trains.

== Notable places nearby ==
- St. Andrew Svorad Abbey
- St. Elizabeth of Hungary Catholic Church
- Weizer Building
