= East 116th–St. Luke's station =

Rapid transit station in Cleveland

E. 116th–St. Luke's
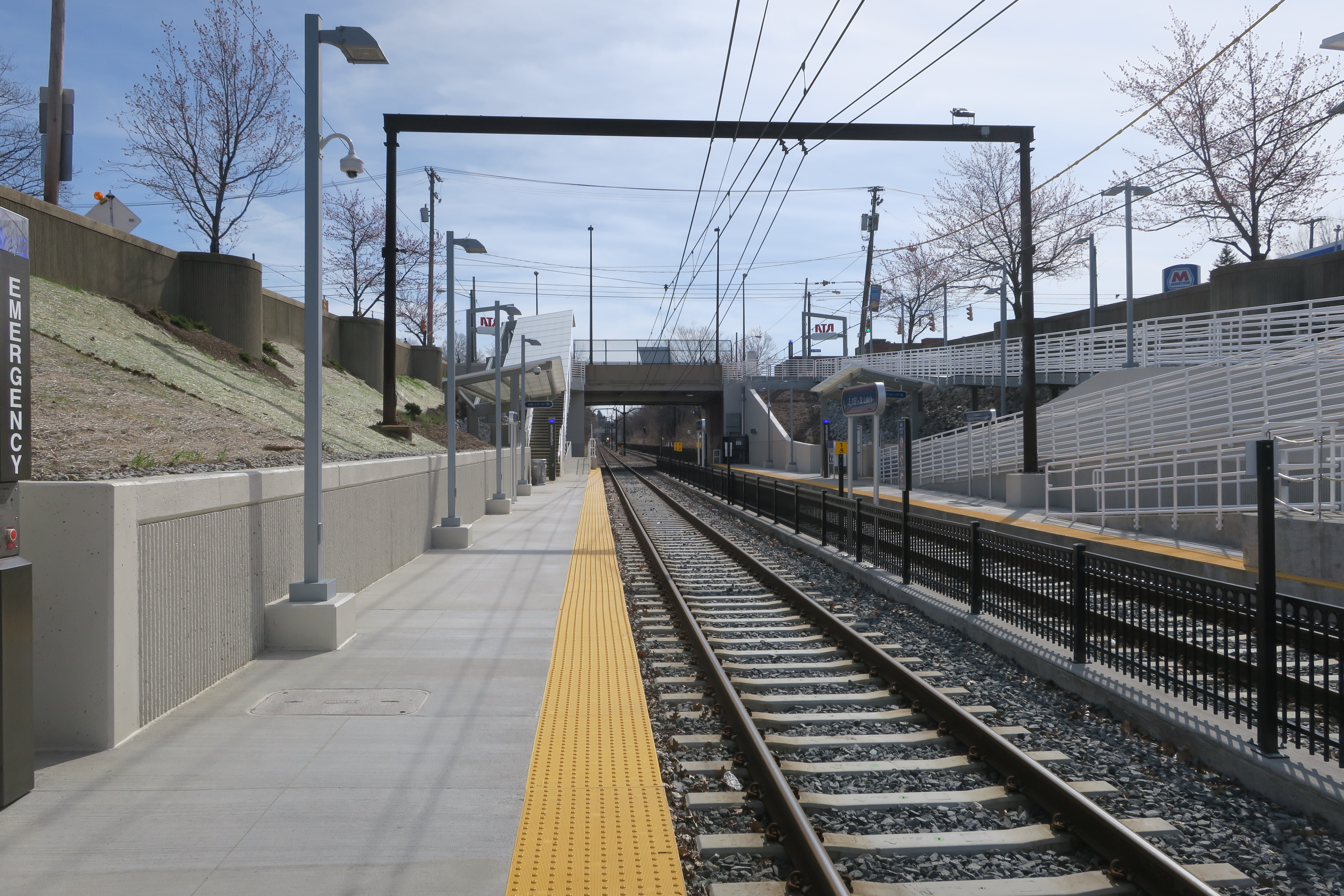
- East 116th–St. Luke's station platform after reconstruction in April 2019

General information
- Location: 2780 East 116th Street; Cleveland, Ohio
- Coordinates: 41°29′2.5″N 81°36′12.3″W
- Owner: City of Shaker Heights
- Operator: Greater Cleveland Regional Transit Authority
- Platforms: 2 side platforms
- Tracks: 2
- Connections: RTA: 50

Construction
- Structure type: Below-grade
- Cycle facilities: Racks
- Accessible: Yes

Other information
- Website: riderta.com/facilities/e116

History
- Opened: April 11, 1920; 106 years ago
- Rebuilt: 1981, 2019
- Former names: East 116th (1920–2019)
- Original company: Cleveland Interurban Railroad

Services
Preceding station	Rapid Transit	Following station
Buckeye–Woodhill toward Tower City	Blue Line	Shaker Square toward Warrensville–Van Aken
Buckeye–Woodhill toward Tower City	Green Line	Shaker Square toward Green Road
Location

East 116th–St. Luke's station is a station on the RTA Blue and Green Lines in Cleveland, Ohio, located in the median of Shaker Boulevard (Ohio State Route 87) below at its intersection with East 116th Street, after which the station is named.

== History ==
The station opened on April 11, 1920, when service commenced on the line west of Shaker Square to East 34th Street and via surface streets to downtown.

In 1980 and 1981, the trunk line of the Green and Blue Lines from East 55th Street to Shaker Square was completely renovated with new track, ballast, poles and wiring, and new stations were built along the line. At East 116th station, new platforms and retaining walls were installed, and the wooden stairways were replaced by the present covered concrete stairways. The renovated line opened on October 30, 1981.

The East 116th station originally served St. Luke's Hospital which opened in 1927 on Shaker Boulevard just west of East 116th Street. The hospital closed in April 1999. A gradual name change was enacted in RTA timetables to coincide with the opening of the new station.

This station was originally planned to be rebuilt with upgraded amenities from January 2016 to September 2017. Those dates were retracted by late 2015. The groundbreaking for construction came on May 30, 2018, with a proposed completion date set for May 2019. The name East 116th–St. Luke's appeared on timetables as early as April 10, 2016. The station was opened ahead of schedule on March 8, 2019.

== Station layout ==
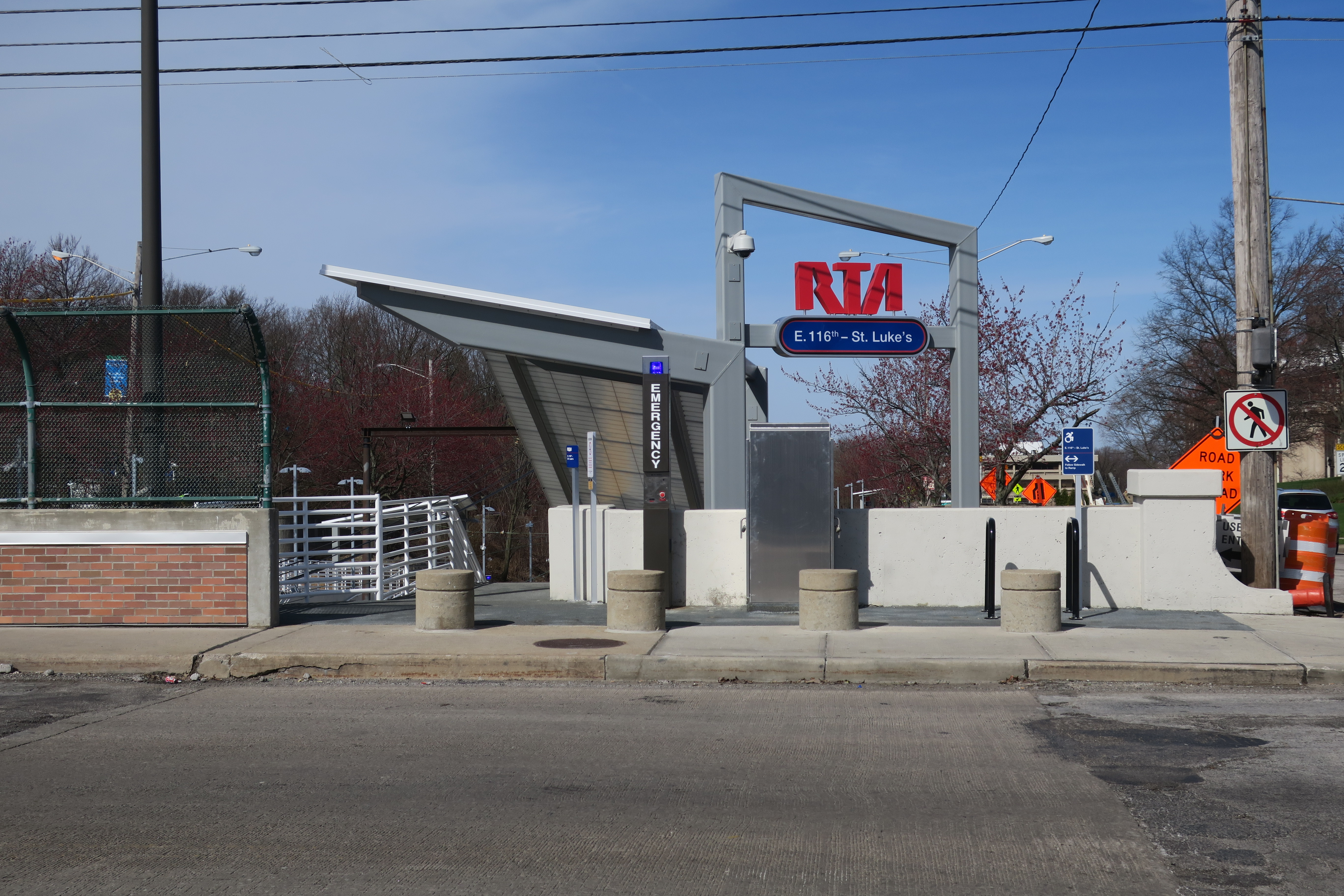
Main entrance to the station from East 116th Street

The station has two side platforms located below grade in the median of Shaker Boulevard west of East 116th Street. The station can be accessed from street level by either stairs or a ramp to each platform. Each platform has mini-high platforms, which allow passengers with disabilities to access trains.

== Notable places nearby ==
- Benedictine High School
- St. Andrew Svorad Abbey
- St. Luke's Hospital
- Weizer Building
