= Kinsman, Cleveland =

Neighborhood of Cleveland, Ohio, United States

Coordinates: 41.558°N 81.569°W

Kinsman
- Neighborhood of Cleveland
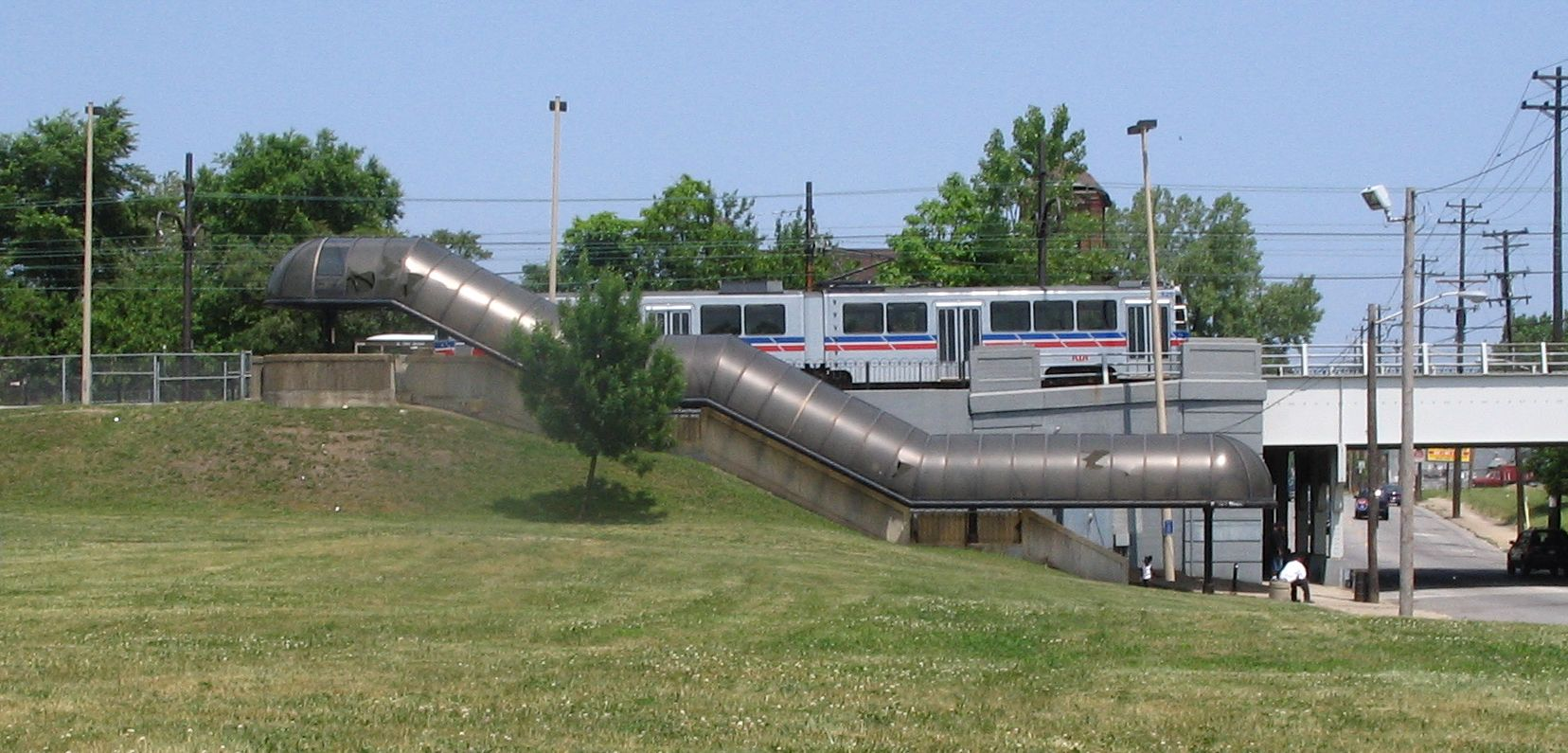
- RTA Blue and Green Line East 79th Street light rail station.

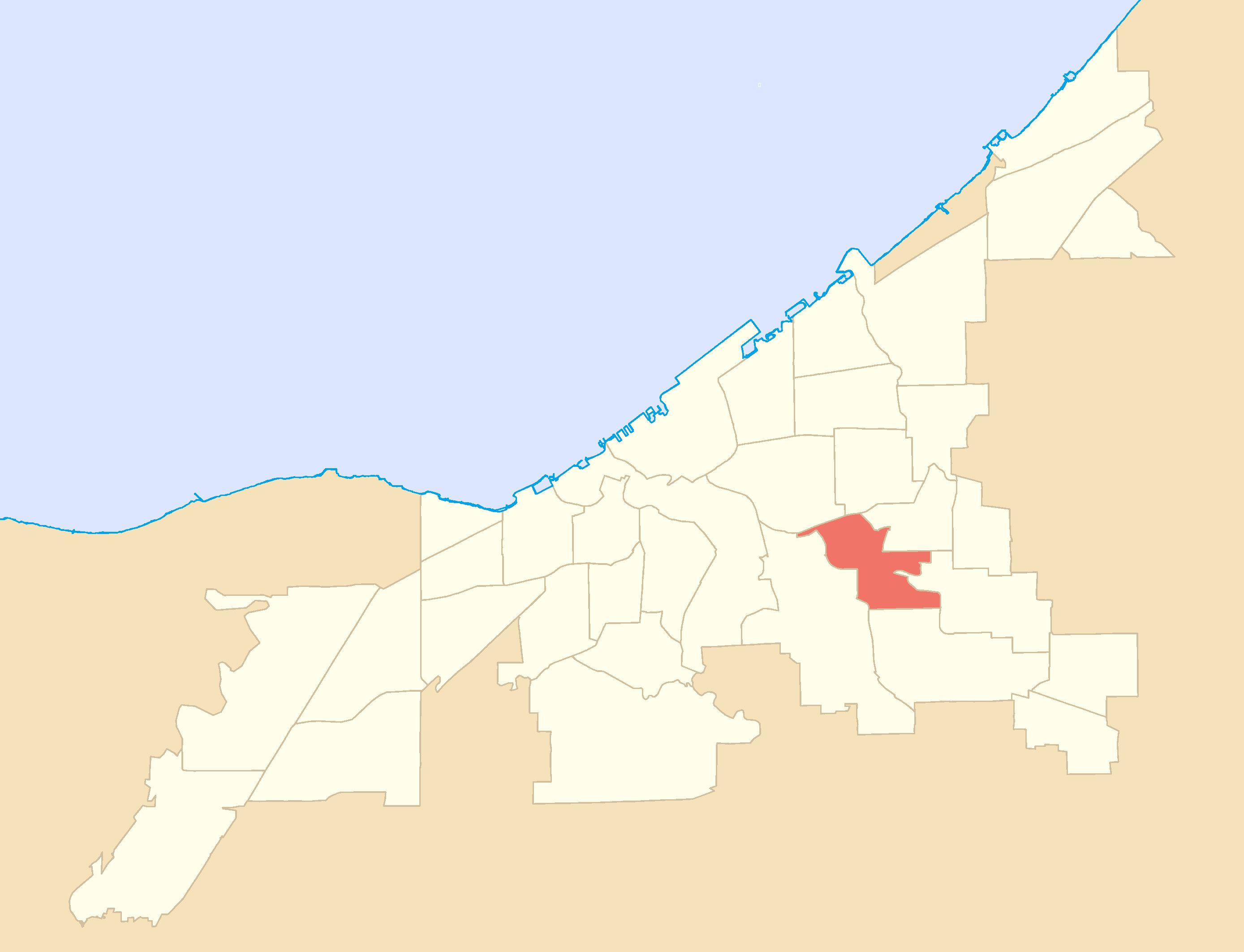
- Country: United States
- State: Ohio
- County: Cuyahoga
- City: Cleveland

Population (2020)
  - Total: 5,887

Demographics
  - White: 2.4%
  - Black: 95.4%
  - Hispanic (of any race): 0.7%
  - Asian and Pacific Islander: 0.0%
  - Mixed and Other: 2.1%
- Time zone: UTC-5 (EST)
  - Summer (DST): UTC-4 (EDT)
- ZIP Codes: 44104, 44105
- Area code: 216
- Median income: $18,046
- Source: 2020 U.S. Census, City Planning Commission of Cleveland.

Kinsman is a neighborhood on the East Side of Cleveland, Ohio. Centered along Kinsman Road, it is bordered to the south by Union Ave, to the east by Kingsbury Blvd and Martin Luther King Jr. Blvd, to the north by the RTA Red Line tracks to the north, and East 55th St to the west. Once a largely Jewish neighborhood, it is today predominantly African American.

The East 79th Street light rail station of RTA's Blue and Green Line is located south of Holton Ave next to East 79th Street.
