= Tri-C–Campus District station =

Rapid transit station in Cleveland

Tri-C–Campus District
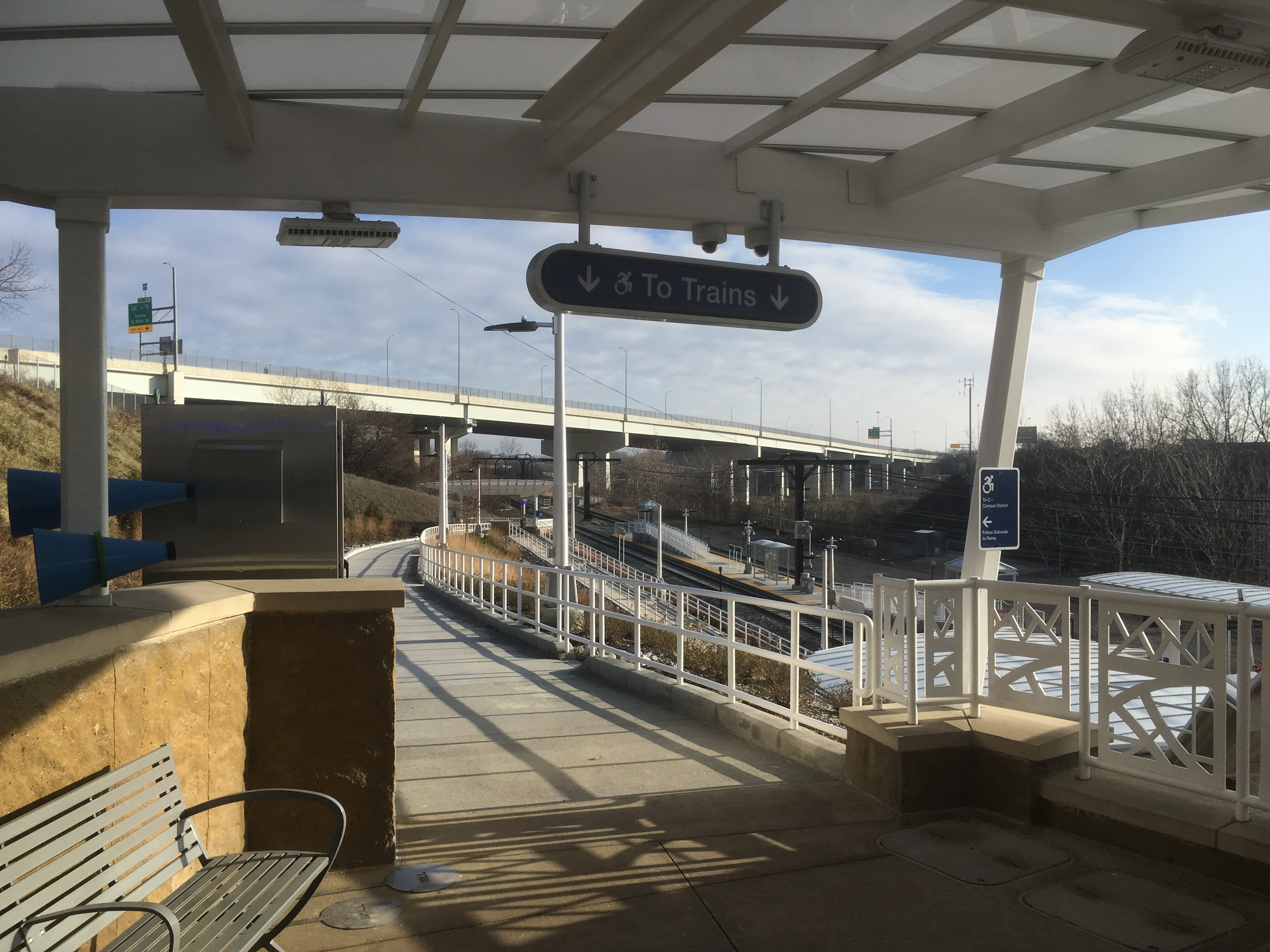
- Tri-C–Campus station in December 2018

General information
- Location: 2733 East 34th Street; Cleveland, Ohio
- Coordinates: 41°29′11″N 81°39′57″W
- Owner: Greater Cleveland Regional Transit Authority
- Line: NS Lake Erie District
- Platforms: 1 island platform with low- and high-level sections
- Tracks: 2
- Connections: RTA: 15, 19, 19A, 19B

Construction
- Structure type: At-grade
- Accessible: Yes

Other information
- Website: riderta.com/facilities/campusdistrict

History
- Opened: July 20, 1930; 96 years ago
- Rebuilt: 1971, 2003, 2018
- Former names: East 34th–Campus
- Original company: Cleveland Interurban Railroad

Services
Preceding station	Rapid Transit	Following station
Tower City toward Airport	Red Line	East 55th toward Windermere
Tower City Terminus	Blue Line	East 55th toward Warrensville–Van Aken
Tower City Terminus	Green Line	East 55th toward Green Road
Location

Tri-C–Campus District station is a station on the RTA Rapid Transit system in Cleveland, Ohio, serving the Red, Blue, and Green Lines. It is located just east of East 34th Street near the intersection of East 34th and Broadway, on the north side of the CSX railway tracks, and below the bridge that carries East 34th Street over the railway tracks. Tri-C refers to Cuyahoga Community College.

The station is somewhat unusual in that it combines a high-level platform rapid transit station with a low-level platform light rail station. The low-level island platform is located on the northwestern end of the station adjacent to East 34th Street, and the high-level island platform extends southeastward from it. Both the light rail and the heavy rail subway cars share the station. East 34th and East 55th are the only stations on the Blue/Green Line, other than downtown's Tower City station, to utilize an island platform. Therefore, due to the fare collection procedure used on the Blue/Green Line, disembarking Blue/Green Line westbound passengers must walk to the front of the train and pay their fare or swipe/dip their farecard at the farebox before walking back through the train to exit one of the car's side left doors. Likewise, passengers departing East 34th station on the Blue/Green Line going eastbound must board the train through one of the train's left side doors and then immediately walk to the front of the train to pay their fare or swipe/dip their farecard at the farebox.

Although the station bears the name "Campus District", it is something of a misnomer as the Cuyahoga Community College campus is not a convenient walk from the station. The station does offer bus connections to that campus as well as to Cleveland State University. It also provides convenient service for the personnel working at the Main Post Office.

== History ==
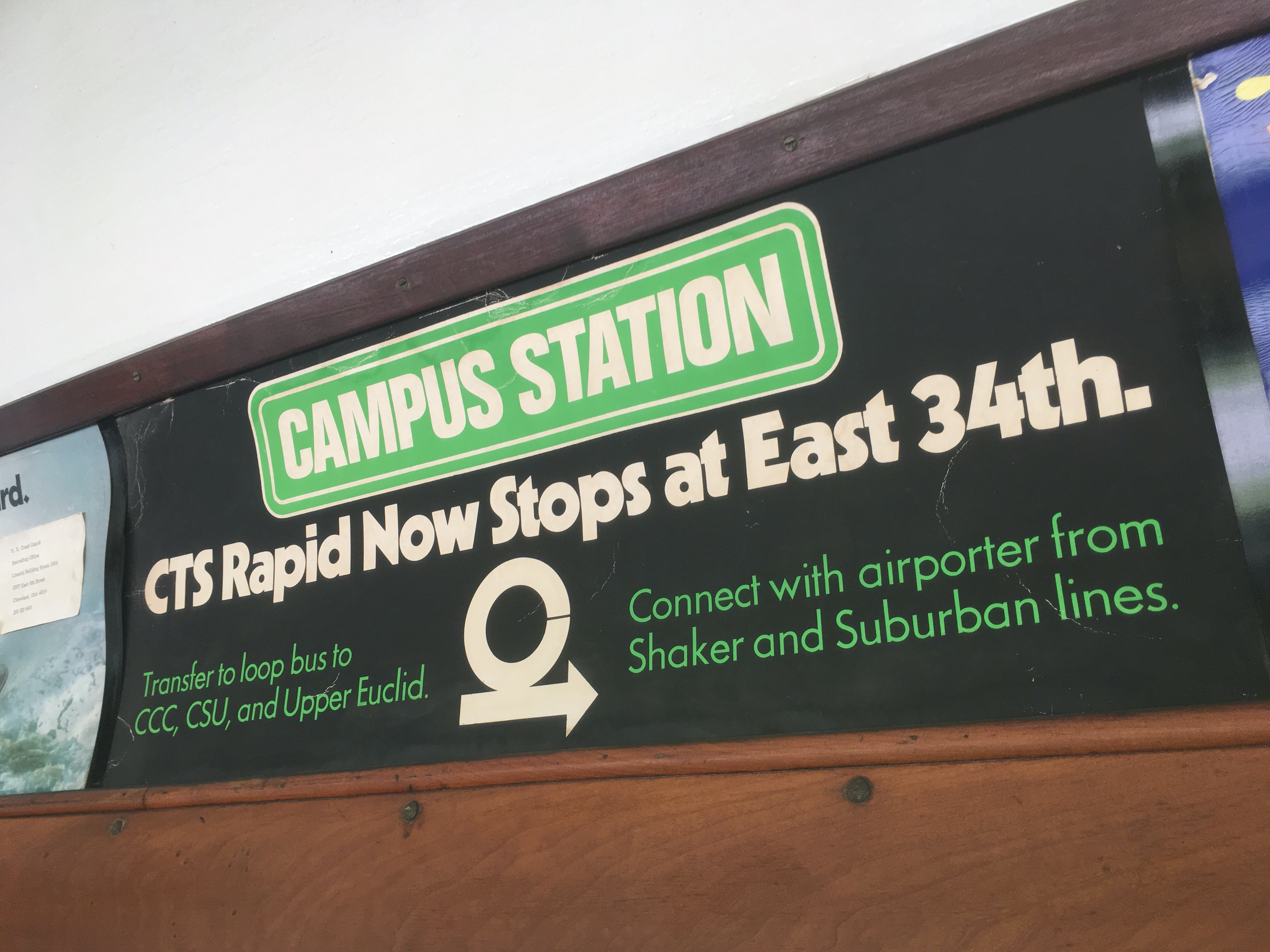
Original notice for the opening of Campus station in 1971, now on display at the Northern Ohio Railway Museum

The station opened on July 20, 1930, as "East 34th Street Station" serving only the Shaker Rapid Transit Lines (today's Green and Blue Lines) when the lines were extended using private right-of-way from East 34th Street to the newly opened Cleveland Union Terminal. When the CTS Rapid Transit (today's Red Line) opened in 1955 it used the same tracks but did not stop at East 34th; the station continued to exclusively serve the Shaker Rapid Transit until 1971. A high-level platform was added to the eastern end of the existing low-level platform to serve the CTS Rapid Transit, and this portion of the station opened on March 1, 1971. The CTS station was designated "Campus Station." In 1975, with the formation of RTA both rapid transit lines came under common operation, and free transfers were provided between the lines.

The wooden stairway from East 34th Street was replaced in the early 1980s with a concrete stairway covered with a metal and tinted acrylic glass canopies. Beginning on October 16, 2000, Red Line service to the station was discontinued as the high-level platform was torn out and replaced. The station was completely reopened on August 18, 2003.

A major reconstruction of the station started in June 2017 and was completed in September 2018. This project made the station fully accessible by the installation of ramps on the hillside to the north of the station. Additionally, this project completely replaced both platforms, new canopies were installed, and landscaping was improved at the station. The Red Line stopped serving this station in October 2017 and was expected to continue bypassing the station until October 2018. The station opened ahead of schedule on September 24, 2018, with the RTA renaming the new station to "Tri-C–Campus District".

== Notable places nearby ==
- St. Joseph's Church and Friary
- Jane Addams Business Careers Center
- Cuyahoga Community College
- Cuyahoga County Juvenile Detention Center
