= Green Line (RTA Rapid Transit) =

Light rail line of the RTA Rapid Transit system in Cleveland and Shaker Heights, Ohio

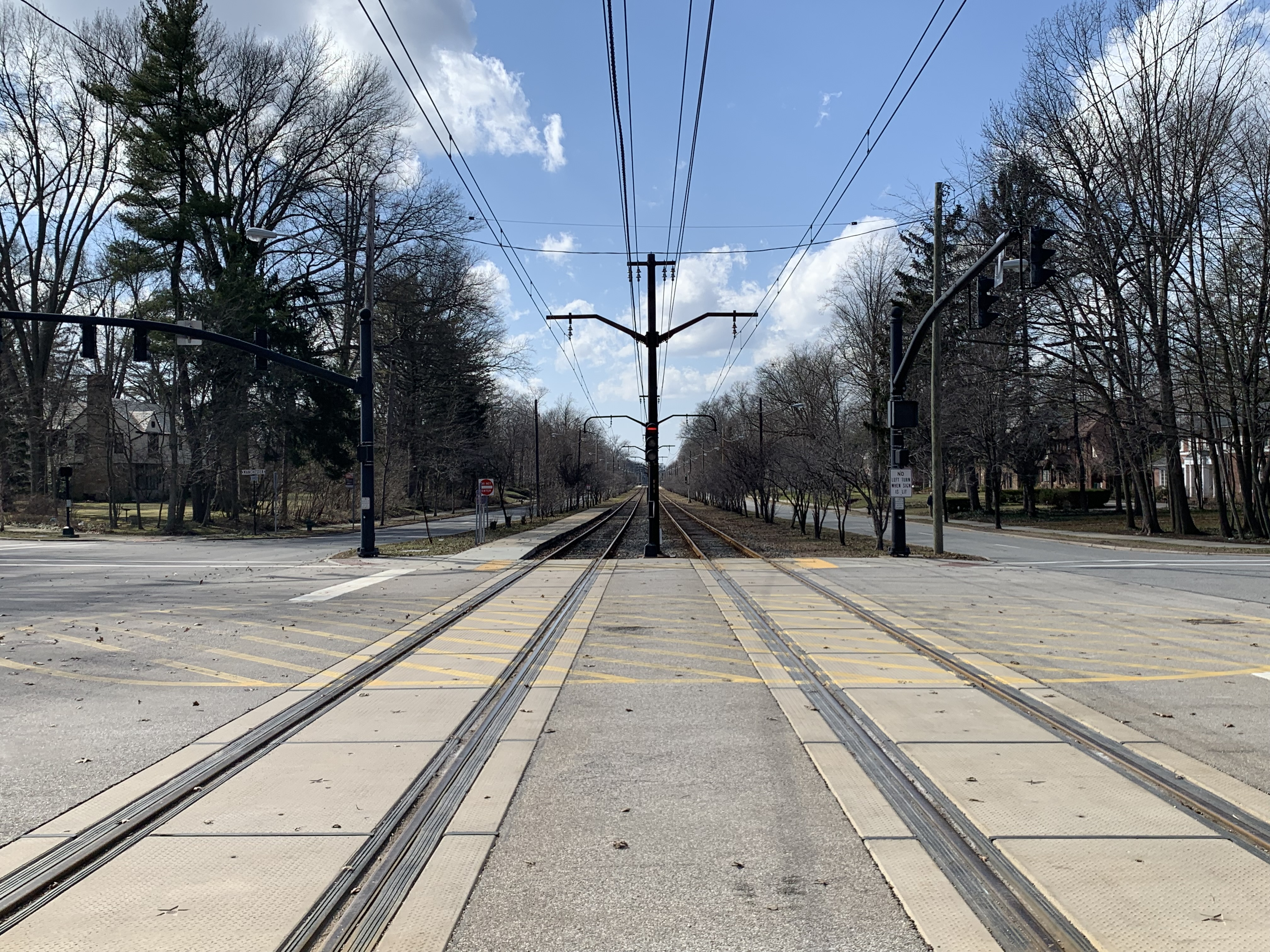
- The Green Line at Courtland Blvd. in Shaker Heights

Overview
- Owner: 1913–1920: Cleveland & Youngstown Railroad; 1920–1930: Cleveland Interurban Railroad; 1930–1935: Metropolitan Utilities; 1935–1944: Union Properties (47%), Guardian Savings and Trust (33%) and Cleveland Trust (20%); 1944–1975: City of Shaker Heights; 1975–present: Greater Cleveland Regional Transit Authority
- Locale: Cleveland and Shaker Heights, Cuyahoga County, Ohio
- Termini: Tower City; Green Road
- Stations: 18

Service
- Type: Light rail/Tram
- System: RTA Rapid Transit
- Operators: 1913–1930: Cleveland Railway; 1930–1944: Cleveland Interurban Railroad; 1944–1975: City of Shaker Heights; 1975–present: Greater Cleveland Regional Transit Authority

History
- Opened: December 17, 1913

Technical
- Line length: 9.75 mi (15.69 km)
- Number of tracks: 2
- Track gauge: 4 ft 8 1/2 in (1,435 mm) standard gauge
- Electrification: Overhead line, 600 V DC

The Rapid Green Line (formerly known as the Shaker Line) is a light rail line of the RTA Rapid Transit system in Cleveland and Shaker Heights, Ohio, running from Tower City Center downtown, then east to Green Road near Beachwood. 2.6 miles (4.2 km) of track, including two stations (Tri-C–Campus District and East 55th), are shared with the rapid transit Red Line; the stations have low platforms for the Green Line and high platforms for the Red Line. The Green Line shares the right-of-way with the Blue Line in Cleveland, and splits off after passing through Shaker Square. All RTA light rail lines use overhead lines and pantographs to draw power.

== Interurban portion ==
From Tower City to just east of East 55th Street, the Blue and Green Lines share track with the Red Line for 2.6 miles (4.2 km) along a private right-of-way originally acquired in 1930 to bring intercity trains into Cleveland Union Terminal (the site of today's Tower City Center). The Tri-C–Campus District station and the East 55th station are shared by the heavy rail rapid transit Red Line and the light rail Blue and Green Lines on the same platform, an arrangement unique in North American rail transit. The shared stations have low platforms for the Blue and Green Lines directly adjacent to high platforms for the Red Line. RTA Central Rail yards and headquarters are located at the East 55th station, where trains of all rail lines are stored and serviced.

East of East 55th, the Blue and Green Lines split from the Red Line and travel east on a separate, dedicated, grade-separated right-of-way. A complex of tunnels existed at this junction to provide means for the Blue and Green Line trains to switch from right to left side running from East 55th to Tower City, but right side running is now used throughout the system, and the tunnels have been closed.

The private right of way extends from this junction to Woodhill Road at the western end of Shaker Boulevard and then below grade through an excavated cut in the median of Shaker Boulevard to Shaker Square. Along this portion of the lines are East 79th station, Woodhill station and East 116th Station. The lines then rise to street level at Shaker Square.

== Suburban portion ==
From Shaker Square eastward, both lines enter Shaker Heights and operate at street level with grade crossings, reflecting this portion of the lines' history as streetcar lines. The Green Line separates from the Blue Line just east of Shaker Square at 41°29′02″N 81°35′20″W, with the Green Line continuing east in the median of Shaker Boulevard. The station-stops east of Shaker Square are adjacent to street intersections and most comprise merely concrete platforms with simple shelters. The central median of Shaker Boulevard expands at Warrensville Road—it was originally planned for a high-speed parkway—and the Green Line continues along this median with Warrensville Road crossing on a bridge overhead. There is also a bridge at Green Road, although the station is actually just west of the bridge and only layover tracks extend beneath the bridge. The Green Line terminates at Green Road and Shaker Boulevard.

== Designations ==
When the Shaker Heights Rapid Transit was absorbed into the RTA, The Green line held the designation of 67A. This was later changed to 67AX. This remained with the opening of the Waterfront "line" extension of the Blue and Green lines. In the mid 2010s, the Waterfront line became a separate designation from the 67 and 67A Blue and Green lines. The Waterfront line was briefly designated as 67W. The three routes have united under the 67 designation, which is now internal and no longer shown on official timetables.

== History ==
RTA light rail expansion
Rail service was extended from Attleboro to Courtland	The Moreland division of the rapid opened, along with the private right-of-way to downtown	Cleveland Union Terminal opened to Shaker trains, both rail divisions were extended east to Warrensville Center Road	
1913 to 1920	1920 to 1928 Legend	1928 to 1930	
The Shaker Division was extended to Green Road	The CTS Rapid Line opened, Drexmore station opened	The lines were redesigned with colors, the downtown terminal was rebuilt	
1930 to 1936 Legend	1936 to 1948 Legend	1948 to 1975 Legend	1978 to 1990 Legend

The Green Line is the direct, continuously operating descendant of the privately owned Cleveland & Youngstown Railroad, Cleveland Interurban Railroad and later the municipally owned Shaker Heights Rapid Transit, built as a branch of the Shaker Heights streetcar lines to connect the streetcar suburb of Shaker Heights to downtown Cleveland. This line, along with the Blue Line, were the only ones to survive the bustitution of Cleveland's transit system, partly due to their use of grade-separated trackage to across much of the east side of Cleveland.

=== Cleveland & Youngstown Railroad ===
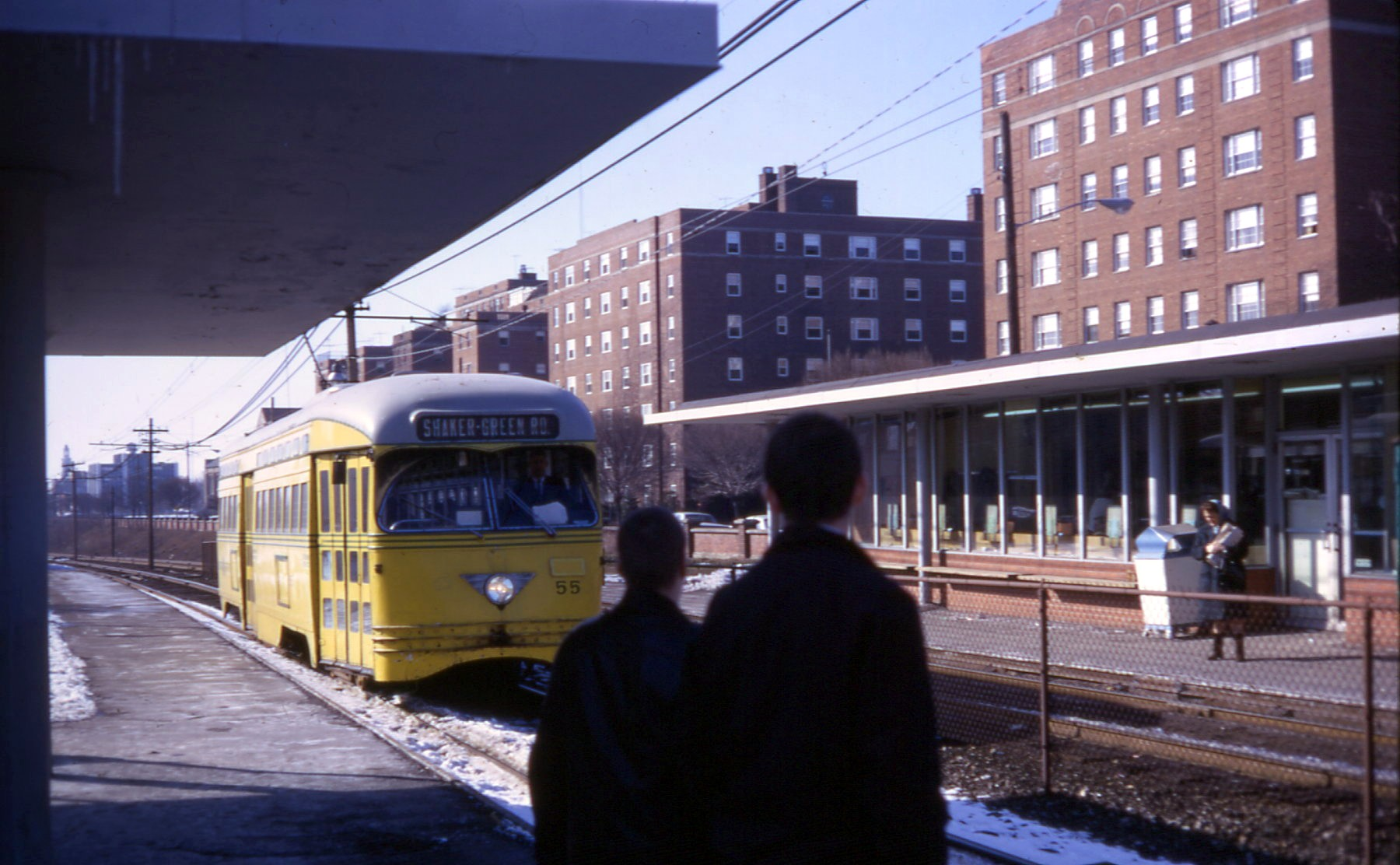
A PCC streetcar approaching Shaker Square station in 1968

The Van Sweringen brothers purchased the land of what is now Shaker Heights in 1906 intending to create a planned suburban community. They knew that the success of their plans depended upon the availability of streetcar service to downtown Cleveland, so they persuaded the Cleveland Railway to extend its Euclid Heights trolley line along Fairmount Boulevard from Cedar Road to Lee Road, which was completed by 1907.

To improve travel times to downtown, the Vans organized the Cleveland and Youngstown Railroad. On October 27, 1911, with a population of only 200, the Village of Shaker Heights was incorporated, and two years later on December 17, 1913, the first section of the C&Y opened, 1.6 miles (2.6 km) from Coventry Road east down the median of the future Shaker Boulevard (then part of Coventry Road) to Fontenay Road (west of Eaton Road). The line connected to downtown Cleveland via a line along Coventry Road, north to the 1907 Shaker Heights streetcar line on Fairmount Boulevard in Cleveland Heights. On May 20, 1915, the eastern terminus of the C&Y was extended from Fontenay Road to Courtland Boulevard.

=== Cleveland Interurban Railroad ===
Initially, the Shaker Line operated independently, being in operation seven years prior to the opening of what is now the Blue Line from Lynnfield to East 55th. When the Moreland (later Van Aken) line opened in April 1920, the Shaker line continued to use the old line through Cleveland Heights. With the opening of the connection from Coventry to Shaker Square on August 16, 1920, the old line became a shuttle to Fairmount, and later closed on March 12, 1923.

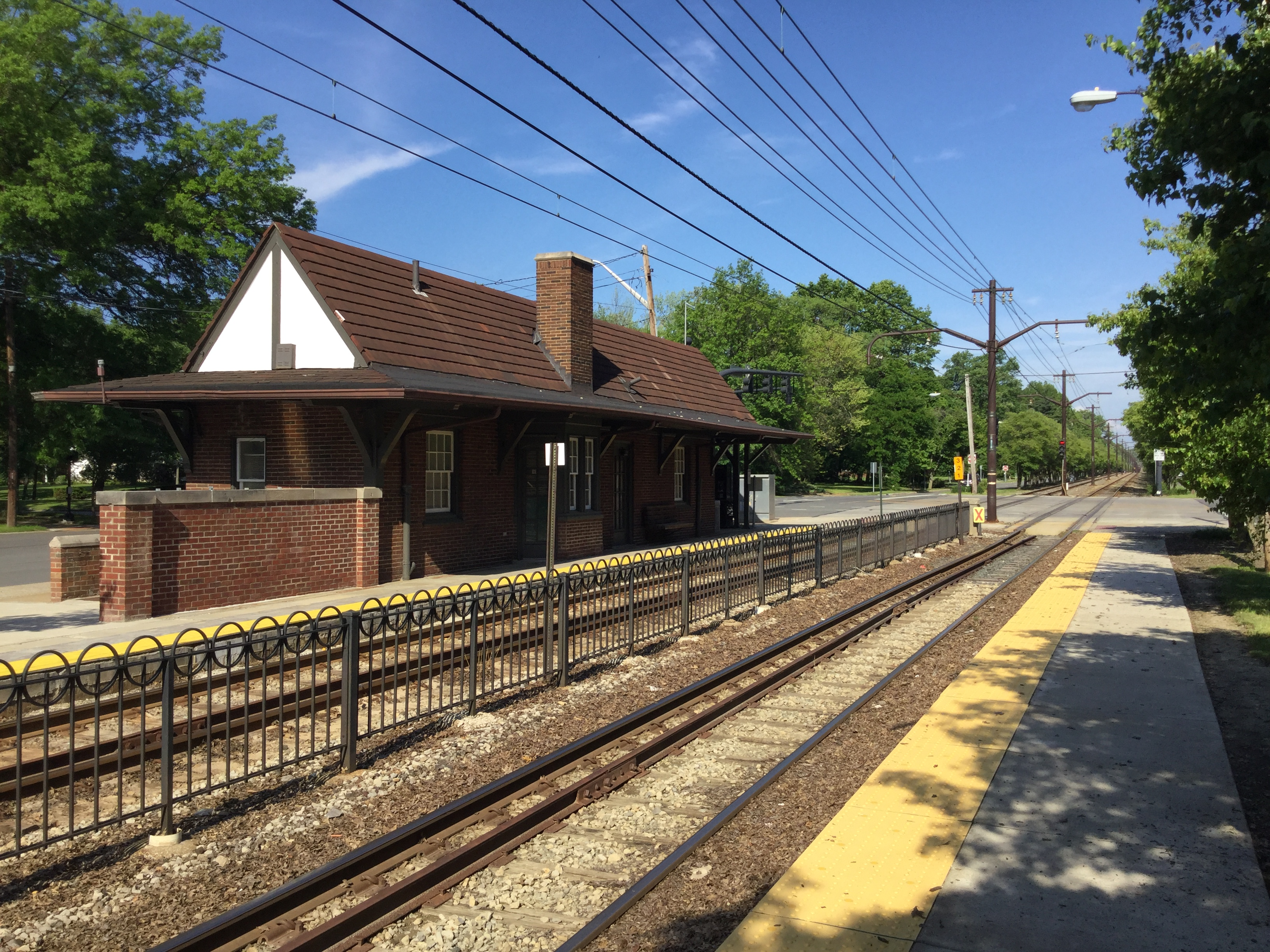
The Coventry stop once housed an auto filling station

There have been several other proposals to connect the Shaker Boulevard rapid transit line with the streetcar line on Fairmount Boulevard. The Fairmount line was perpetually plagued with low ridership, and a connection to the Shaker line was seen as a way to improve service and make the Fairmount line more attractive to riders. In 1922, Cleveland Railway proposed a connection from Moreland Circle (now Shaker Square) along North Moreland Boulevard and what is now Fairhill Road (then called Fairmount Road) to the existing tracks on Coventry Road. The trackage for the entire connection would run in the median of divided boulevards.

As the Van Sweringens' railroad plans grew, they constructed a new Union Terminal for Cleveland. Cleveland Union Terminal (CUT) opened in 1930, along with a new grade-separated right-of-way with side-by-side lines for steam railroads and interurban streetcars, including the CIRR. Although their plans for another interurban line never materialized (the right-of-way was later used for the Red Line), the CIRR immediately began operations via the new right-of-way into the north part of CUT specially reserved for interurban train service. The CIRR no longer needed to run on city streetcar tracks and the ramp to Broadway and East 34th Street was removed. The first CIRR trains rolled into CUT on July 20. A further extension of the Shaker Boulevard line moved the eastern terminus to Green Road on November 1, 1936.

=== Shaker Heights Rapid Transit ===
On September 6, 1944, the City of Shaker Heights took over the financially struggling lines and began operating them as Shaker Heights Rapid Transit. The city lacked funds for major line extensions. However, it did modernize the fleet with the purchase of PCC cars beginning in 1947.

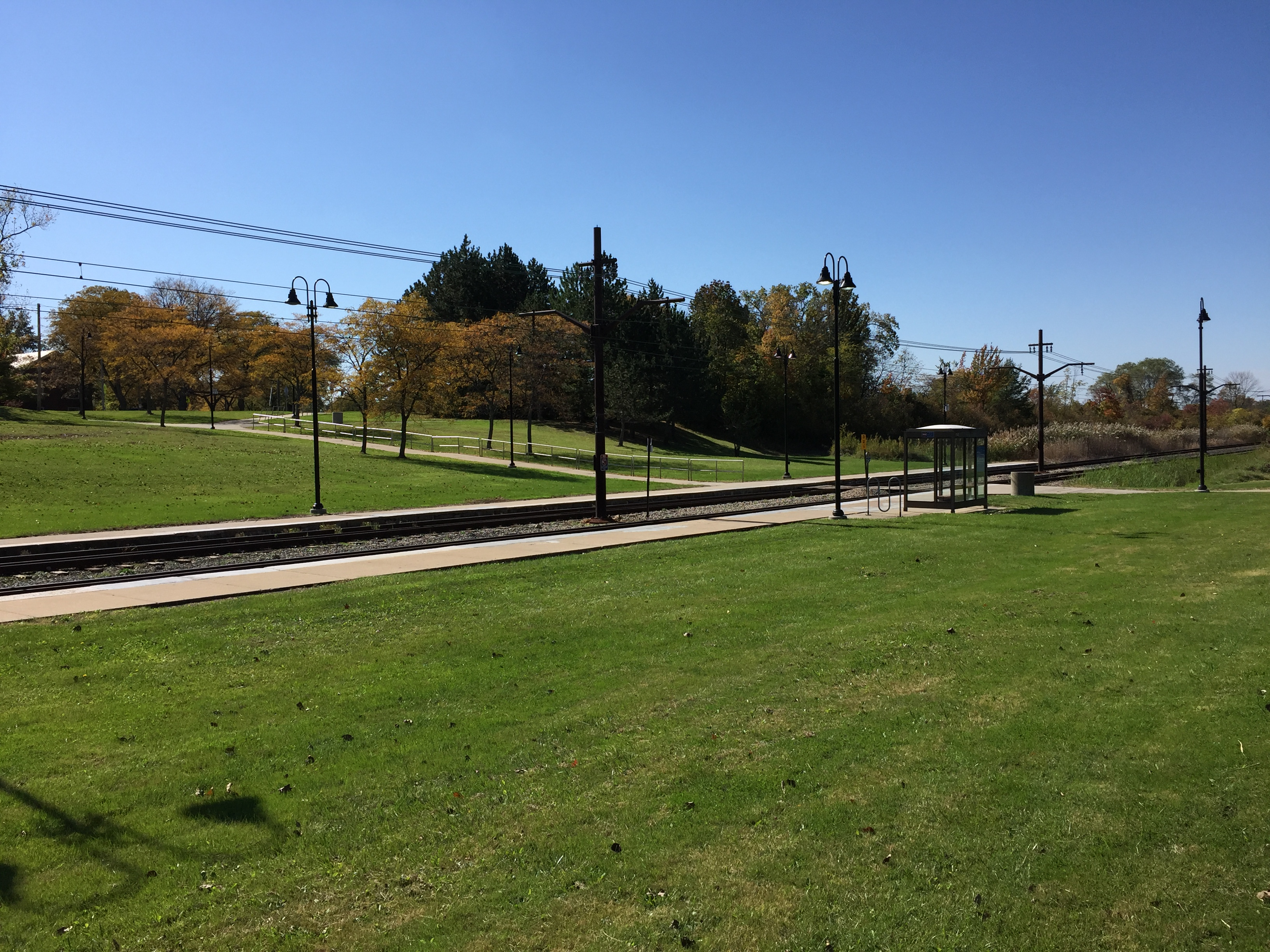
Belvoir station, near the eastern end of the line

Prior to the conversion of the Fairmount streetcar line to bus service in 1948, the Cleveland Transit System (CTS), which had taken over operation of the Cleveland streetcar lines in 1941 attempted to have the Shaker Heights Rapid Transit (then operated by the City of Shaker Heights) take over the Fairmount line from Coventry Road to its terminus at Canterbury Road. The same route as in 1922 was proposed to connect the lines, and CTS further proposed extending the Fairmount line eastward to Fairmount Circle where it could attract more riders from John Carroll University. However, Shaker Heights lacked the money to undertake the work, and Fairmount Boulevard streetcar service soon ended.

In 1955 the Cleveland Transit System (which was formed in 1942 when the City of Cleveland took over the Cleveland Railway Company) opened the first section of the city's new rapid transit line, now known as the Red Line. It used much of the right-of-way and some of the catenary poles from the Van Sweringen's planned east-west interurban line adjacent to the NYC&StL tracks. The first section of the CTS rapid transit east from Cleveland Union Terminal included 2.6 miles (4.2 km) and two stations shared with the Shaker Heights Rapid Transit line, necessitating split platforms with low-level sections (for Shaker Heights rapid transit cars) and high-level sections (for CTS rapid transit cars).

=== Greater Cleveland Regional Transit Authority ===
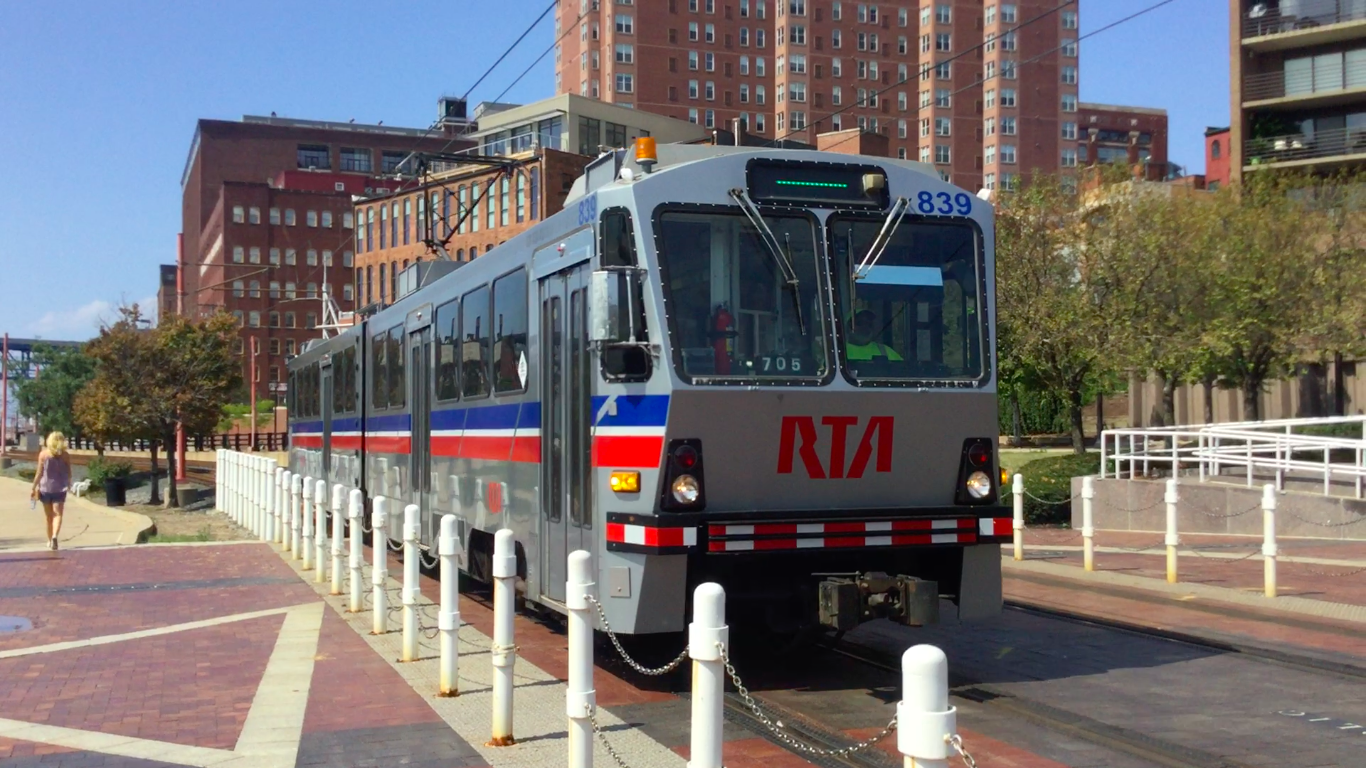
A Breda train at Settlers Landing station

By the 1970s the City of Shaker Heights was struggling to maintain the Shaker Heights Rapid Transit and in Cleveland, CTS was facing financial problems with its rapid transit and bus system. Significant federal money was available, but only if a regional transit system was formed. In 1974, the Greater Cleveland Regional Transit Authority (or RTA) was organized to take over the municipal transit system in Cleveland and others throughout Cuyahoga County. Voters approved a county-wide sales tax increase to help subsidize the transit system and RTA officially took over the Shaker Heights Rapid Transit lines on July 14, 1975. On September 30, 1979, RTA adopted a new designation for the rapid transit lines. The Airport-Windermere Line became the Red Line, while the Shaker Rapid Transit lines (Shaker and Van Aken) became the Green and Blue Lines.

In 1980, RTA undertook a complete renovation of the Green Line, with new track, ballast, poles and overhead wiring. Existing stations were demolished and new stations constructed. The project necessitated closing the Green Line east of Shaker Square for most of the summer of 1980, with substitute bus shuttles and single-tracking along the remainder of the line from East 55th Street to Shaker Square. To run on the renovated lines, a fleet of new LRVs were purchased from an Italian firm, Breda Costruzioni Ferroviarie, to replace the aging PCC cars. The new line was dedicated on October 30, 1981.

== Schedule ==
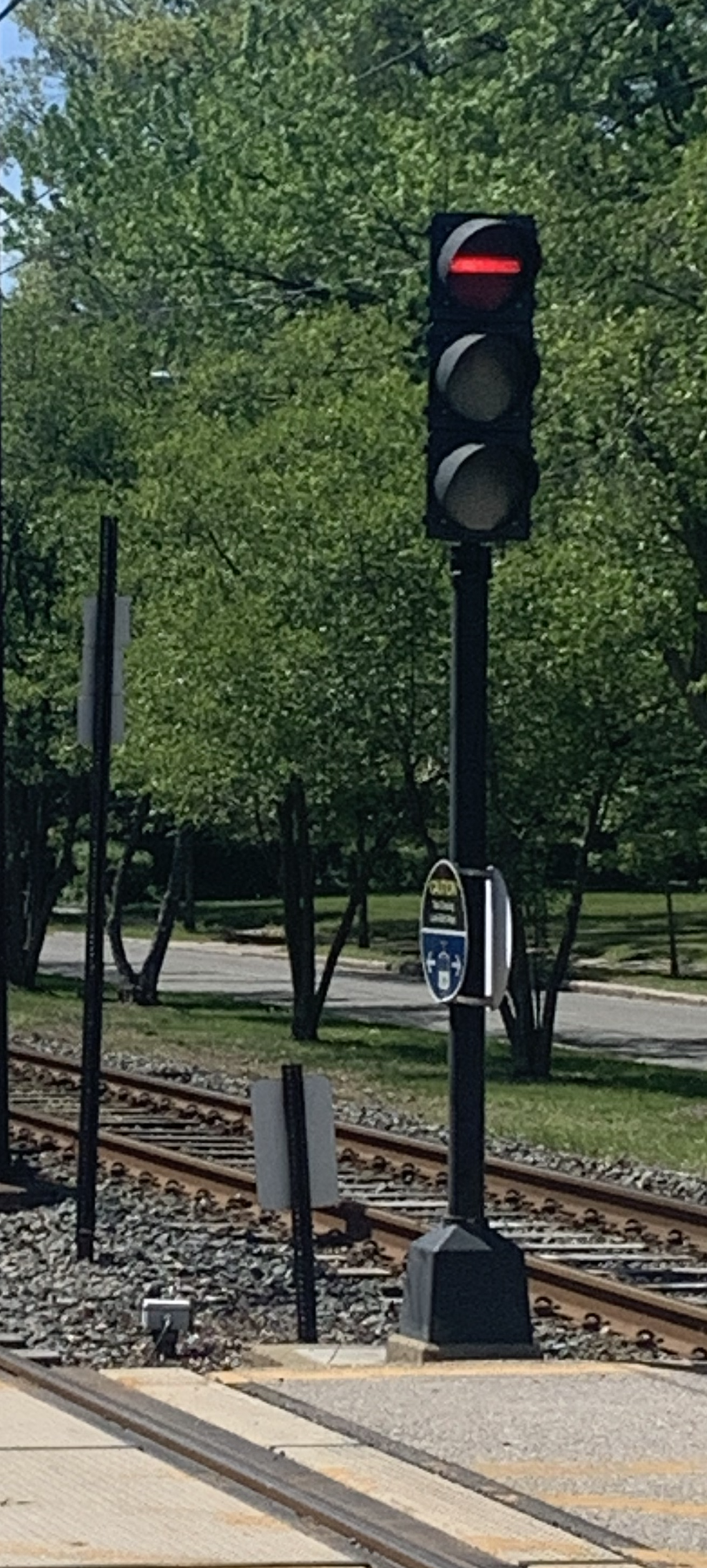
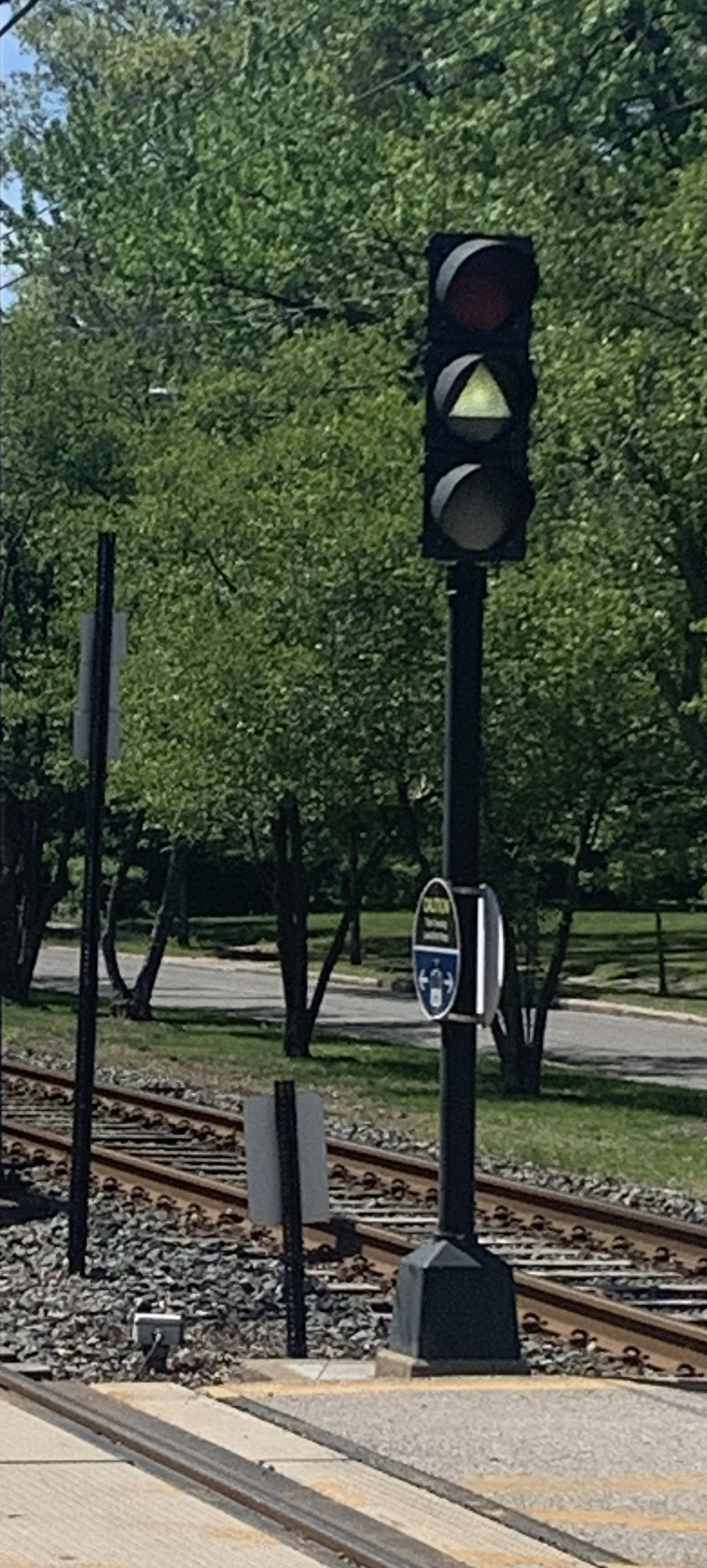
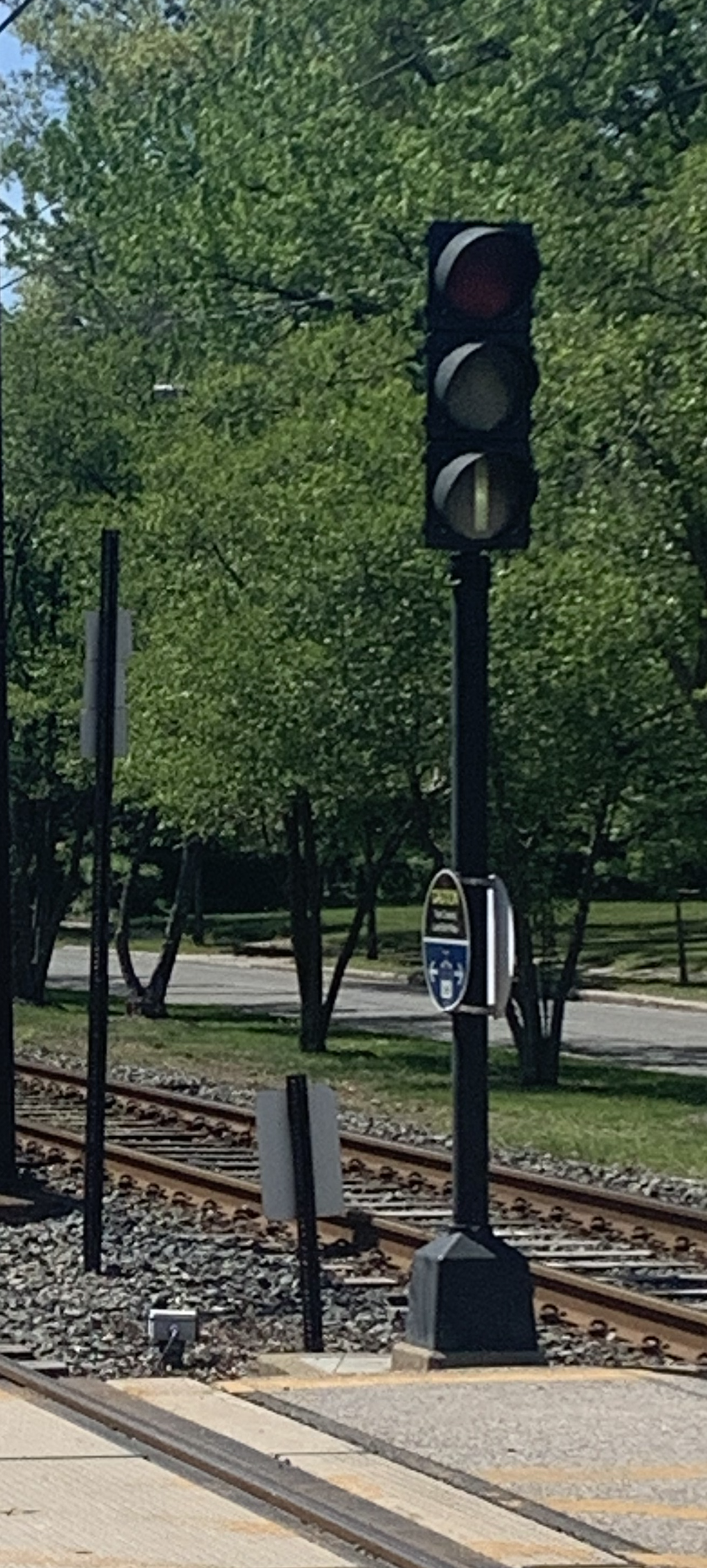
An example of signaling used at grade crossings along RTA Rapid Transit lines

Blue and Green Line trains operate from approximately 3:40 a.m. to 1:00 a.m. daily. Each line operates every 30 minutes on weekdays and weekends, with service between Tower City and Shaker Square every 15 minutes. Waterfront Line service, before its suspension, was run by Blue Line trains from 7:00 a.m. to 7:00 p.m. on weekdays, and 9:30 a.m. to 7:00 p.m on weekends.

== Rail Replacement Bus ==
During rail shutdowns, RTA uses the replacement bus designation "67R". Green Line shuttle buses run between Tower City and Green Road.

== Rolling stock ==
Year	Make	Model	Length mm /( in)	Width mm /( in)	Gauge	Numbers
1980–1981	Breda	LRV	23,504 mm (77 ft 1.4 in)	2,818 mm (9 ft 2.9 in)	4 ft 8 1/2 in (1,435 mm) standard gauge	48

The Blue and Green Lines use a fleet of 48 light rail vehicles (LRVs) manufactured by Breda Costruzioni Ferroviarie in 1980 and 1981. Each car is 77.13 feet (23,509 mm) long, 11.32 feet (3,450 mm) high, and 9.3 feet (2,835 mm) wide and is articulated with operator cabs at each end, seating 84 passengers in 42 double transverse seats. The units are numbered 801–848. RTA needs 34 of the cars for regular use, and requires only 17 to operate currently scheduled service.

The cars originally had white exteriors with broad orange and red stripes, and an interior finished in earth tones with faux wood paneling and orange and brown vinyl padded seats. With the opening of the Waterfront Line in 1996, RTA renovated five cars with blue and white exteriors, gray interiors with new gray and blue fabric-covered seats, and portraits of famous Clevelanders.

The fleet is over 25 years old, and RTA is currently renovating up to 34 cars with the hope of making them last for another 15 years. The renovated cars have silver exteriors with blue and red stripes, and gray and silver interiors with blue and red seats.

The Breda LRV cars replaced a fleet of PCC cars, some built for the Shaker Rapid Transit in 1947 and some purchased in 1953 and 1959.

== Stations ==
Stations between East 55th and Shaker Square were not served by the Green Line until August 16, 1920.

Station	Date opened	Location	Connections / notes
Tower City	July 20, 1930	Downtown	RTA Rapid Transit: Blue Red Waterfront; RTA BRT: HealthLine; RTA Bus: 1, 3, 8, 9, 11, 14, 14A, 15, 19, 19A, 19B, 22, 25, 26, 26A, 39, 45, 51, 51A, 53, 53A, 55, 55B, 55C, 71, 77, 90, 251; Laketran: 10, 11, 12; METRO RTA: 61; PARTA: 100; SARTA: 4
Tri-C–Campus District	July 20, 1930	Central	RTA Rapid Transit: Blue Red; RTA Bus: 15, 19, 19A, 19B
East 55th	April 11, 1920	North Broadway	RTA Rapid Transit: Blue Red; RTA Bus: 16
East 79th	April 11, 1920	Kinsman	RTA Rapid Transit: Blue; RTA Bus: 2
Buckeye–Woodhill	April 11, 1920	Kinsman / Woodland Hills	RTA Rapid Transit: Blue; RTA Bus: 8, 10
East 116th–St. Luke's	April 11, 1920	Woodland Hills	RTA Rapid Transit: Blue; RTA Bus: 50
Shaker Square	April 11, 1920	Buckeye–Shaker	RTA Rapid Transit: Blue; RTA Bus: 8, 48
Coventry	December 17, 1913	Buckeye–Shaker/Shaker Heights	
Southington	December 17, 1913	Shaker Heights	
South Park	December 17, 1913	Shaker Heights	
Lee–Shaker	December 17, 1913	Shaker Heights	RTA Bus: 40
Attleboro	December 17, 1913	Shaker Heights	
Eaton	May 20, 1915	Shaker Heights	
Courtland	May 20, 1915	Shaker Heights	
Warrensville–Shaker	December 6, 1928	Shaker Heights	RTA Bus: 41, 41F
Belvoir	November 1, 1936	Shaker Heights	
West Green	November 1, 1936	Shaker Heights	
Green Road	November 1, 1936	Shaker Heights	RTA Bus: 34, 94
