= East 79th station (GCRTA Blue and Green Lines) =

Rapid transit station in Cleveland

E. 79th Street
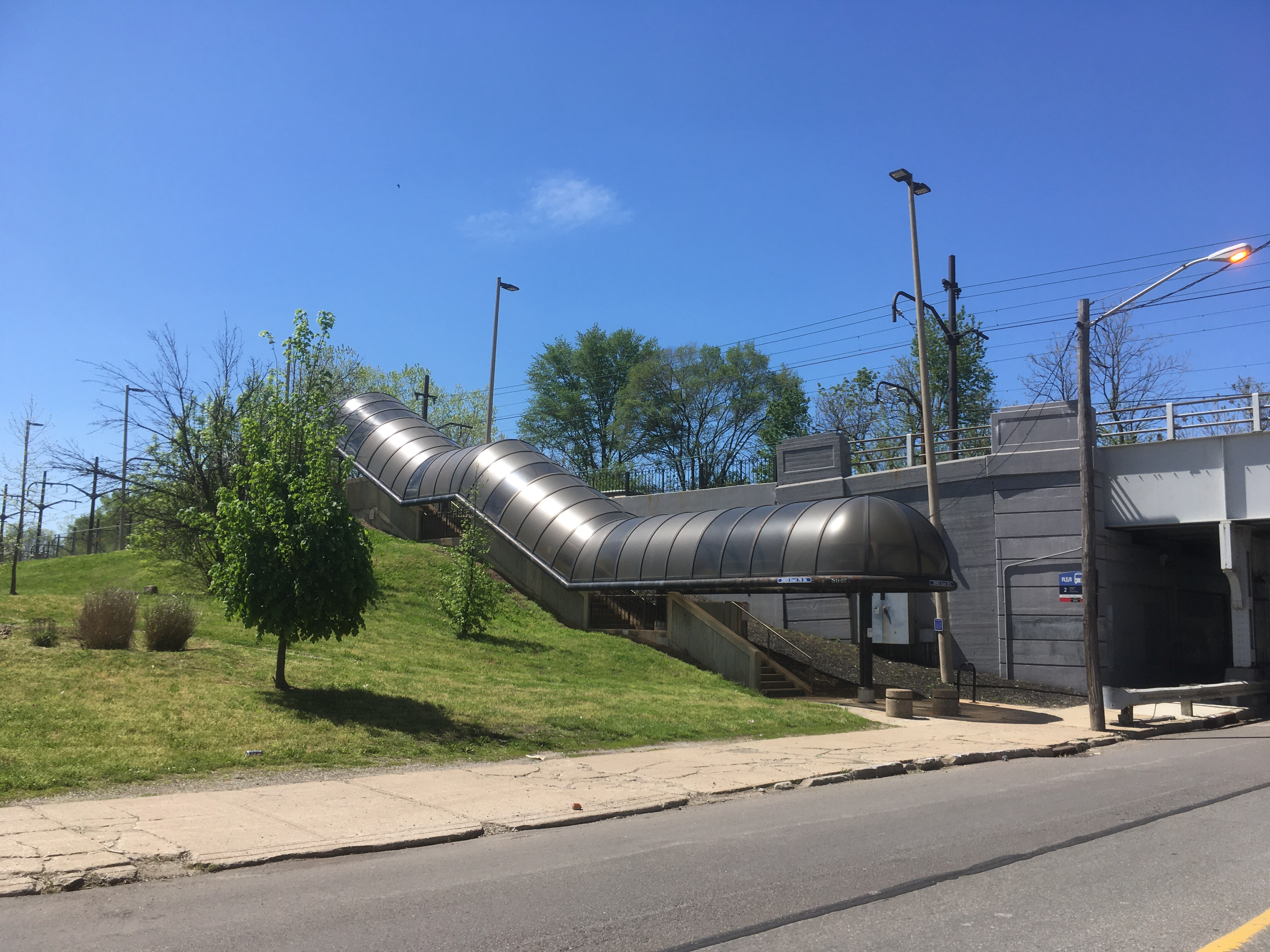
- Entrance to East 79th station in May 2020

General information
- Location: 2870 East 79th Street; Cleveland, Ohio
- Coordinates: 41°28′50″N 81°38′00″W
- Owner: Greater Cleveland Regional Transit Authority
- Line: Cleveland Short Line Railway
- Platforms: 2 side platforms
- Tracks: 2
- Connections: RTA: 2

Construction
- Structure type: Embankment
- Cycle facilities: Racks
- Accessible: No

Other information
- Website: riderta.com/facilities/e79bluegreen

History
- Opened: April 11, 1920; 106 years ago
- Rebuilt: 1981
- Original company: Cleveland Railway

Services
Preceding station	Rapid Transit	Following station
East 55th toward Tower City	Blue Line	Buckeye–Woodhill toward Warrensville–Van Aken
East 55th toward Tower City	Green Line	Buckeye–Woodhill toward Green Road
Location

East 79th station (signed as E. 79th Street) is a station on the RTA Blue and Green Lines in Cleveland, Ohio. It is located on East 79th Street, south of Holton Avenue.

== History ==
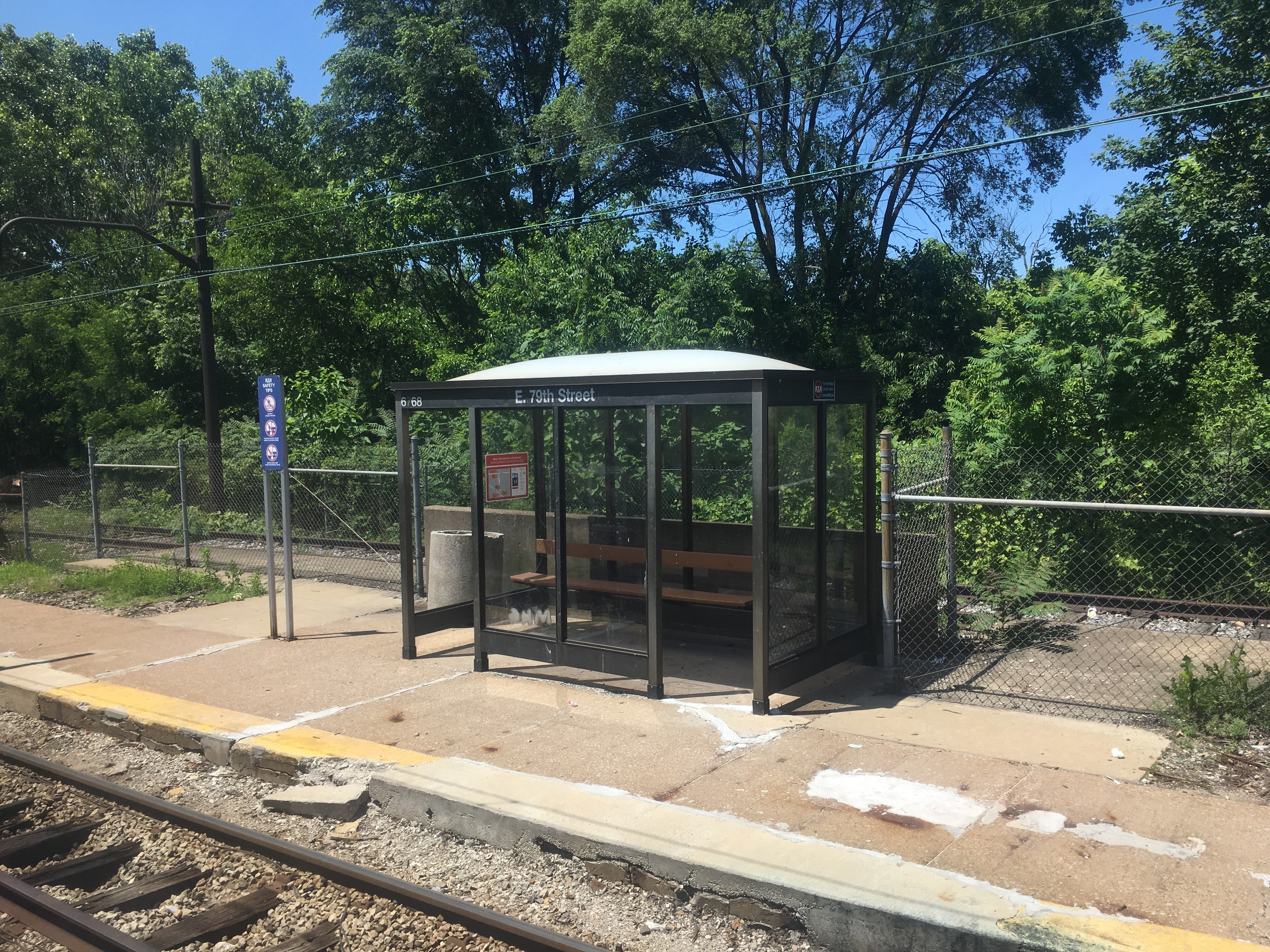
Station shelter

The station opened on April 11, 1920, when service commenced on the line west of Shaker Square to East 34th Street and via surface streets to downtown.

The worst accident in the history of the RTA Rapid Transit occurred just east of the station. On July 8, 1977, two cars collided head-on during single-track operation. The accident occurred at the bridge over East 92nd Street. Both operators and 60 passengers were injured, and both cars were a total loss.

In 1980 and 1981, the trunk line of the Green and Blue Lines from East 55th Street to Shaker Square was completely renovated with new track, ballast, poles and wiring, and new stations were built along the line. The renovated line opened on October 30, 1981.
