= East 55th station =

Rapid transit station in Cleveland

E. 55th St.
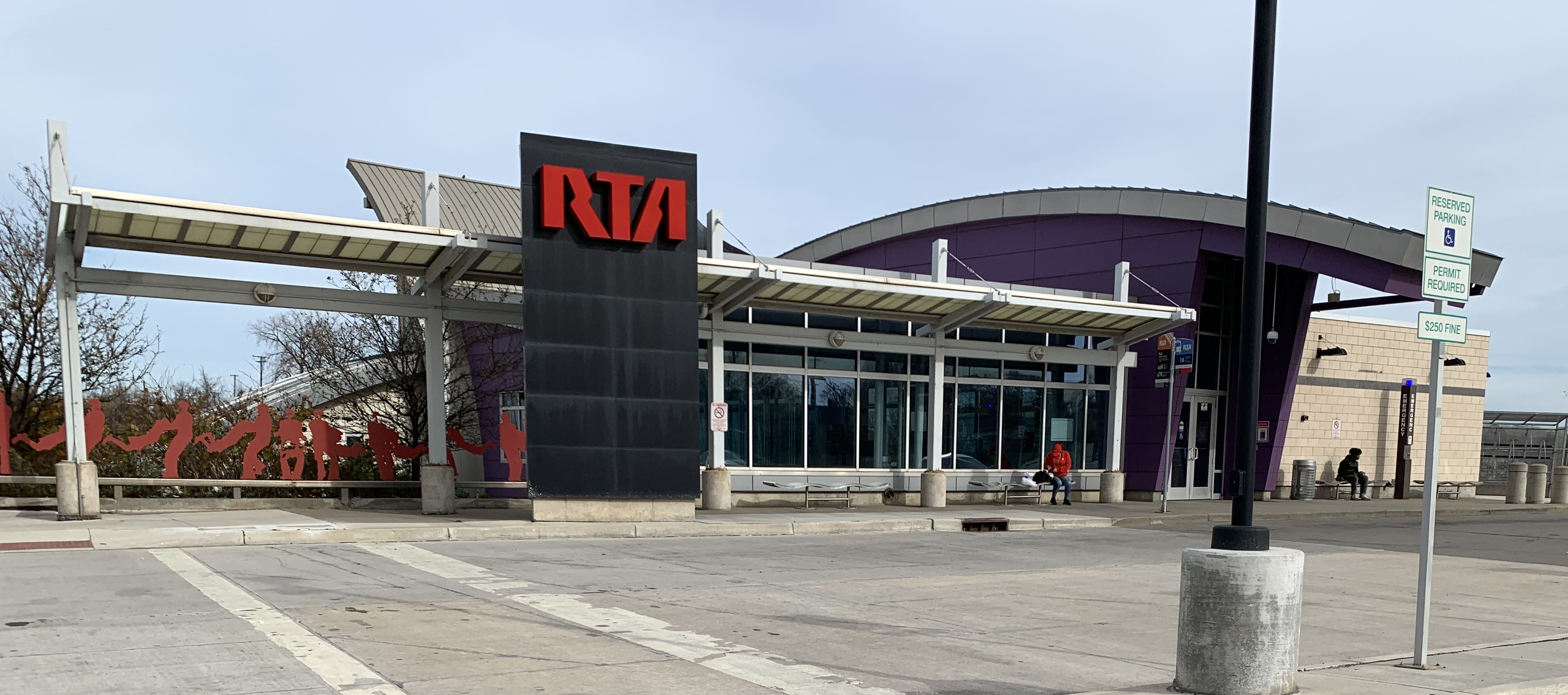
- East 55th station entrance

General information
- Location: 2890 East 55th Street; Cleveland, Ohio
- Coordinates: 41°28′50″N 81°39′7″W
- Owner: Greater Cleveland Regional Transit Authority
- Line: NS Lake Erie District
- Platforms: 1 island platform with low- and high-level sections
- Tracks: 2
- Connections: RTA: 16

Construction
- Structure type: Below-grade
- Parking: 50 spaces
- Cycle facilities: Racks
- Accessible: Yes

Other information
- Website: riderta.com/facilities/e55

History
- Opened: April 11, 1920; 106 years ago
- Rebuilt: 1955, 2011
- Original company: Cleveland Railway

Services
Preceding station	Rapid Transit	Following station
Tri-C–Campus District toward Airport	Red Line	East 79th toward Windermere
Tri-C–Campus District toward Tower City	Blue Line	East 79th toward Warrensville–Van Aken
Tri-C–Campus District toward Tower City	Green Line	East 79th toward Green Road
Former services
Preceding station	Cleveland Railway	Following station
Terminal Square Terminus	Moreland Line 1920–1930	East 79th toward Lynnfield
Terminal Square Terminus	Shaker Line 1920–1930	East 79th toward Warrensville
Location

East 55th station (signed as East 55th Street) is a station on the RTA Red, Blue, and Green Lines in Cleveland, Ohio. The station entrance is located on the east side of East 55th Street just north of the intersection with Bower Avenue and the eastern terminus of Interstate 490.

The station is fairly unusual in that it serves both high-level boarding rapid transit or heavy rail trains and low-level boarding light rail trains from a single central island platform. High-level boarding for the Red Line is located at the western end of the platform and low-level boarding for the Green and Blue Lines is to the east. East 55th and Tri-C–Campus District are the only stations on the Blue/Green Line, other than downtown's Tower City station, to have island platforms. Therefore, due to the fare collection procedure used on the Blue/Green Line, disembarking Blue/Green Line westbound passengers must walk to the front of the train and pay their fare or swipe/dip their farecard at the farebox before walking back through the train to exit one of the car's side left doors. Likewise, passengers departing East 55th station on the Blue/Green Line going eastbound must board the train through one of the train's left side doors and then immediately walk to the front of the train to pay their fare or swipe/dip their farecard at the farebox.

== History ==
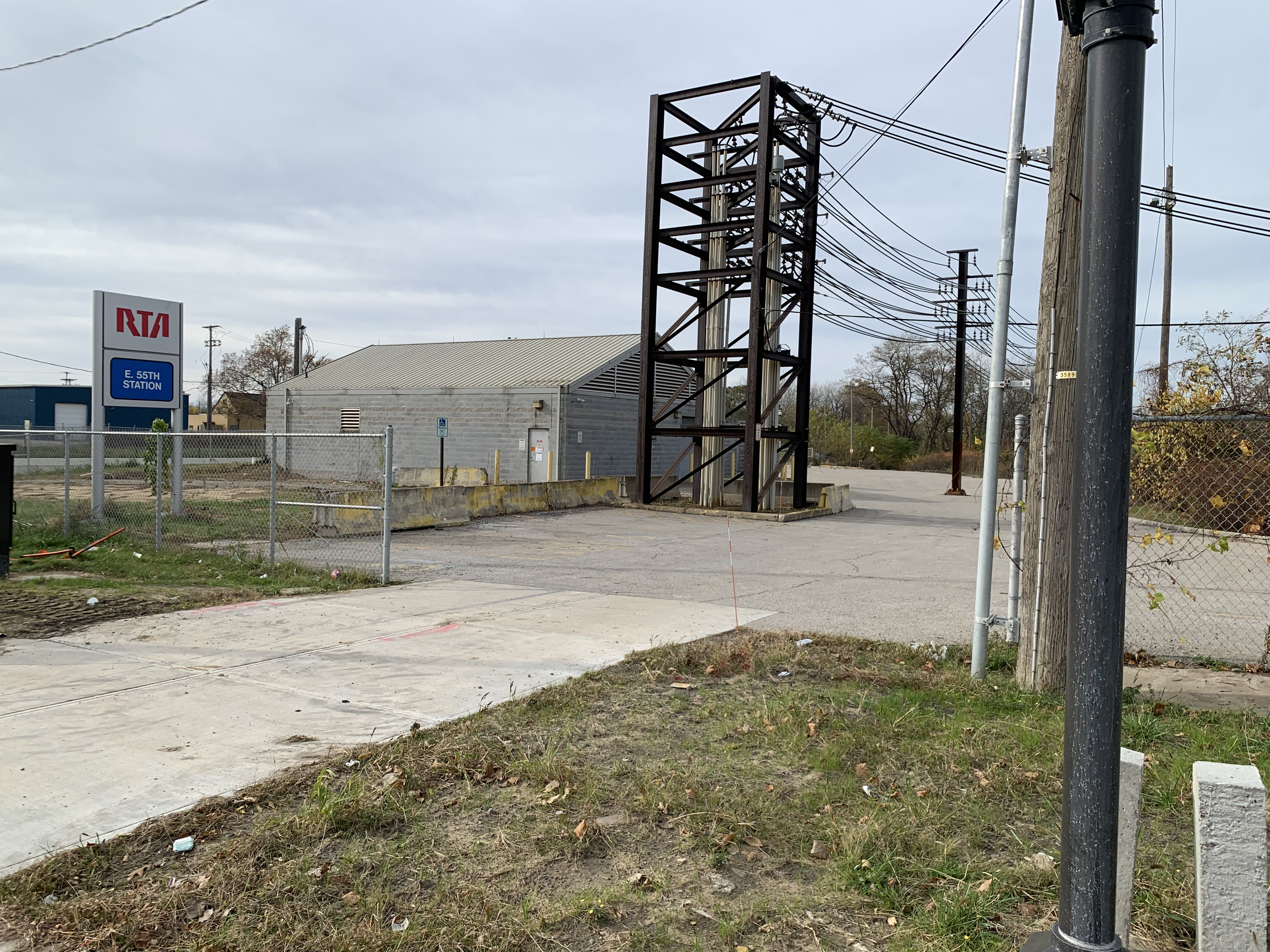
Former station site on western side of East 55th Street, former sign still in place

The station was first used for the Shaker Rapid Transit, the predecessor of the Green and Blue Lines. The Shaker Rapid Transit opened along private right-of-way from Shaker Square to East 34th Street on April 11, 1920. The station then consisted of a low-level island platform and a wooden stairway to East 55th Street.

The Shaker Rapid Transit was able to use an island platform at this station and at East 34th Street because it used left side running on its dual tracks west of East 65th Street (that is, each train traveled forward on the left track of the pair, instead of the right as is common and as done over the rest of the line). Therefore, the doors on the right side of each car opened onto the island platform at these stations. The switch from right to left side and vice versa was accomplished at a complex of tunnels located at East 65th Street. The tunnels also provided access from the trunk line to the Kingsbury Car Yard and Shops located in the Sidaway Valley, and they allowed for connection to the proposed line along the right-of-way eventually used by the Red Line.

When the CTS Rapid Transit (today's Red Line) was built, high-level side platforms were installed on each side of the island platform to accommodate the subway-style cars. Separate stairways were constructed from the two side platforms to a fare booth located at the East 55th Street entrance. The CTS line was opened on March 15, 1955. The CTS Rapid Transit and the Shaker Rapid Transit stations operated independently. Since the CTS Rapid Transit and the Shaker Rapid Transit were separately owned and since there was no transfer provided between the lines, there was no reason to have a connection at track level between the two stations.

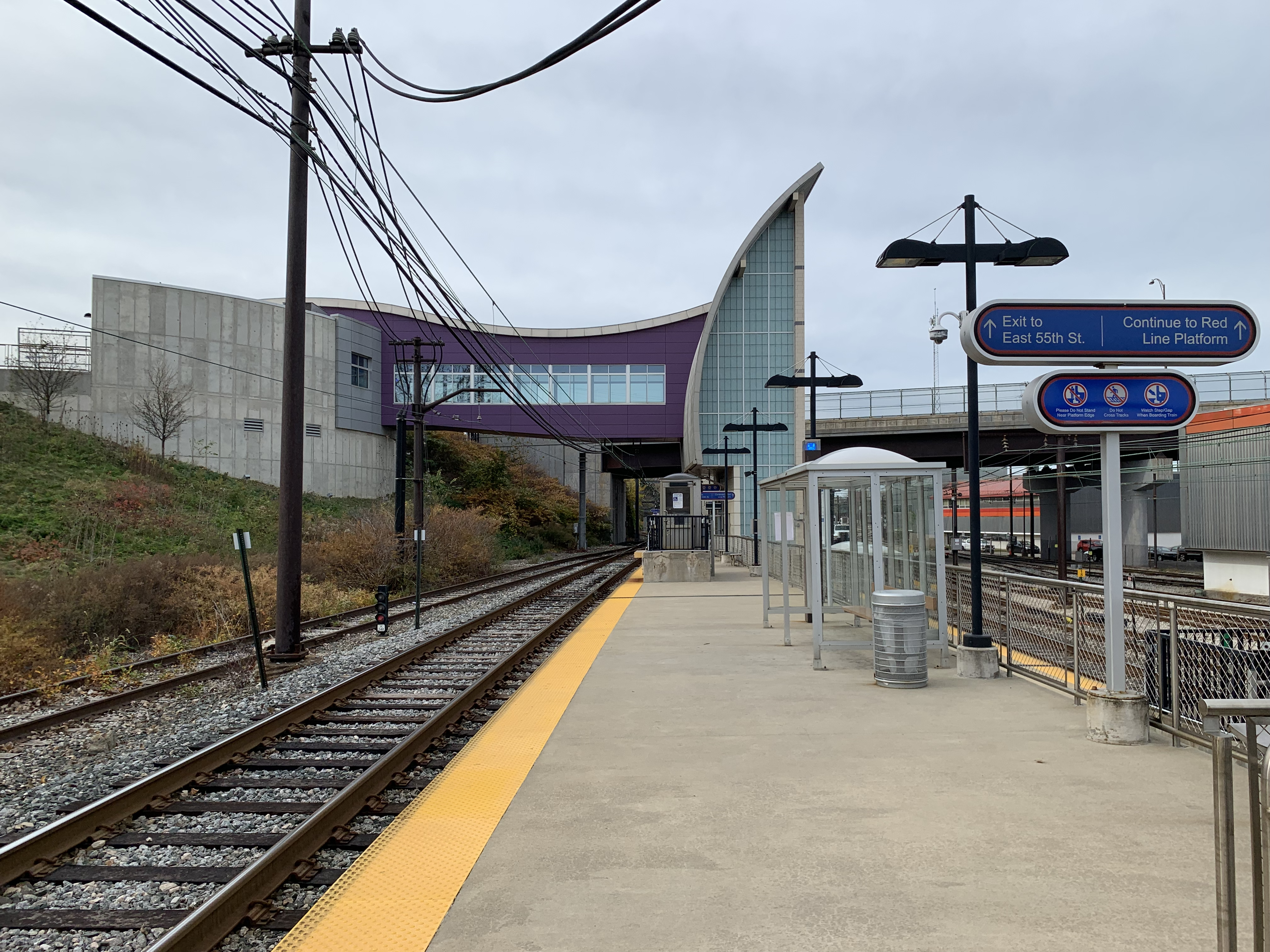
Westbound light rail platforms in 2022

When the Regional Transit Authority was formed on September 5, 1975, it merged the CTS and Shaker Rapid Transit systems, so convenient connection between the lines was needed. RTA first encouraged passengers to transfer at East 34th station where a platform level connection had existed since 1971. Eventually, the island platform was eliminated along with the separate stairway to East 55th Street, and new low-level platforms were constructed at the western end of the high-level platforms. The high-level platforms were shortened, since RTA no longer ran the longer trains for which the platforms were originally designed.

In 2009, RTA began a complete renovation of the station as it had not received any significant improvements since its original construction and was not accessible compliant. The rebuilt station opened in 2011 and includes a new headhouse built on the northeast corner of East 55th and Bower Ave attached to a new parking lot and bus loop. From the headhouse, a bridge extends over the eastbound rapid tracks to a stairway and elevator leading to a single, central island platform. After reaching the platform, passengers may proceed forward to the west and walk up a ramp to the high level Red Line platform, or may turn and walk east to the low level Blue/Green Line platform. Passengers may also walk from one end of the platform to the other to switch from the Red Line to the Blue/Green Line or vice versa.

=== Central Rail Maintenance Facility ===
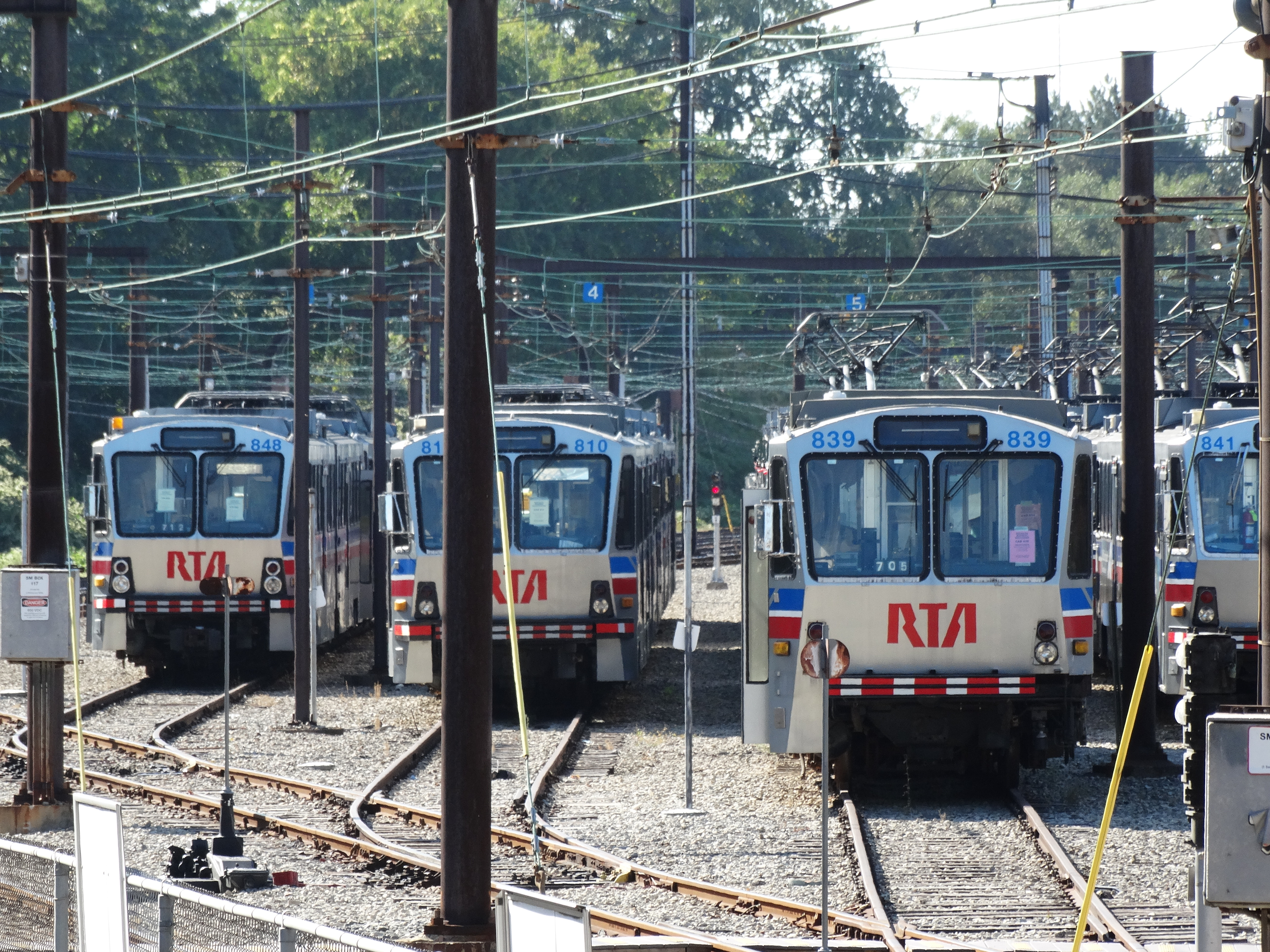
Light rail vehicles parked at East 55th Yard

East 55th Station is located adjacent to RTA's Central Rail Maintenance Facility, opened on April 29, 1984, on a 20-acre (81,000 m^{2}) site. The yard for all rapid transit cars was built on the site of the former rail yard of the Nickel Plate Road. The nearby Kingbury Shops originally built for the Shaker Rapid Transit were closed as operations were consolidated in the Central Rail facility.

== Notable places nearby ==
- Bohemian National Hall
- Brotherhood Park
- East Technical High School
- Shiloh Baptist Church
- Outhwaite Homes
- Woodland Cemetery
