= Tower City station =

Rapid transit station in Cleveland

Tower City
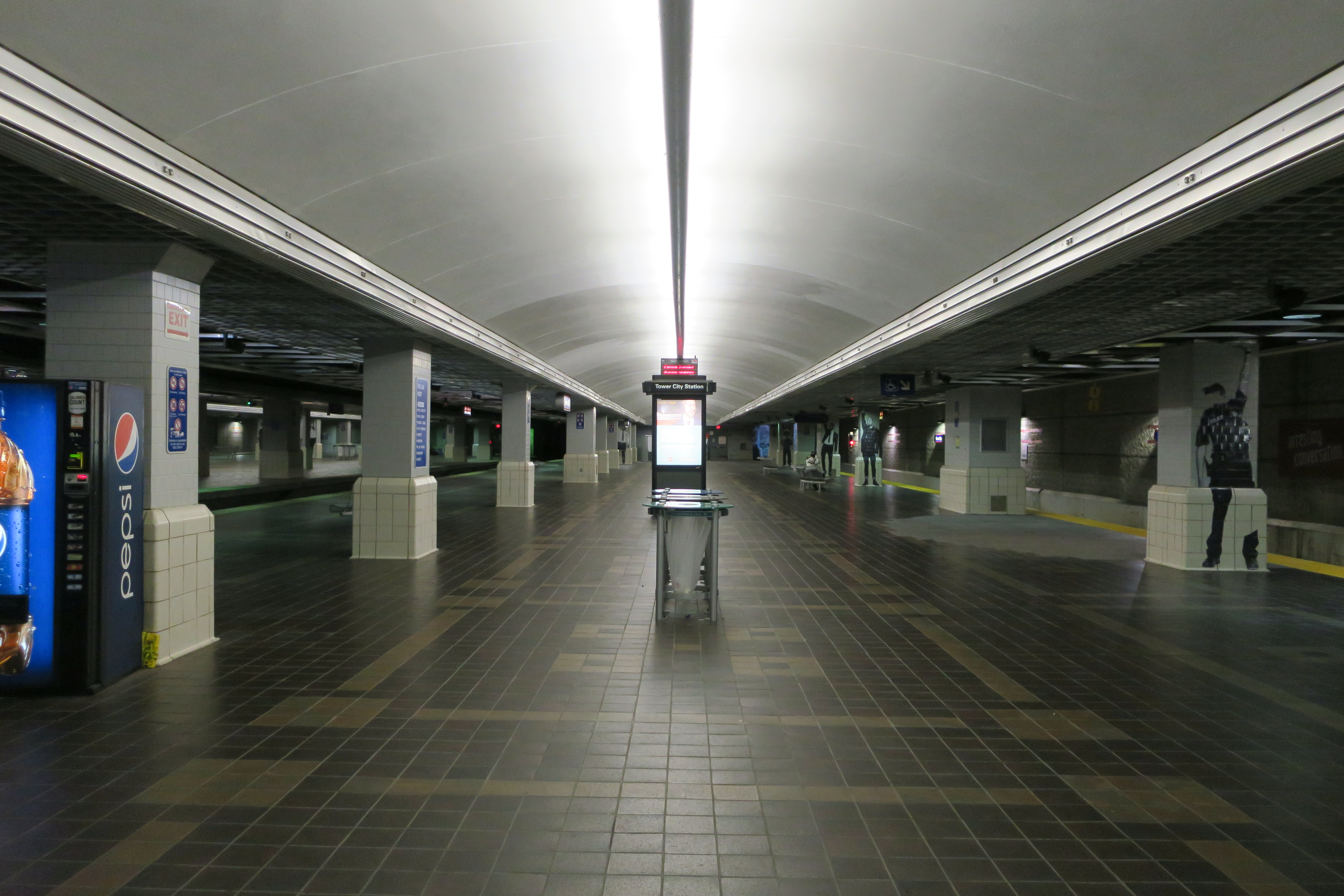
- The westbound Red Line platform in 2016

General information
- Location: 230 West Huron Road; Cleveland, Ohio
- Coordinates: 41°29′51″N 81°41′38″W
- Owner: Greater Cleveland Regional Transit Authority
- Platforms: 2 low island platforms (light rail); 2 high island platforms (rapid transit)
- Tracks: 2 outer through tracks 2 inner stub tracks 2 non-revenue tracks
- Connections: HealthLine, Cleveland State Line (55, 55B, 55C); RTA: 1, 3, 8, 9, 11, 14, 14A, 15, 19, 19A, 19B, 22, 25, 26, 26A, 39, 45, 53, 53A, 71, 77, 90, 251, B-Line Trolley; Laketran: 10, 11, 12; METRO RTA: 61; PARTA: 100; SARTA: 4

Construction
- Structure type: Underground
- Parking: Paid parking nearby
- Cycle facilities: Racks
- Accessible: Yes

Other information
- Website: riderta.com/facilities/towercity

History
- Opened: March 15, 1955; 71 years ago December 10, 1990; 35 years ago (Blue and Green Lines); July 10, 1996; 30 years ago (Waterfront Line)
- Former names: Public Square (–1990); Cleveland Terminal
- Original company: Cleveland Transit System

Key dates
- Platforms built: July 20, 1930 (unused); March 15, 1955; December 10, 1990

Services
Preceding station	Rapid Transit	Following station
West 25th–Ohio City toward Airport	Red Line	Tri-C–Campus District toward Windermere
through to Waterfront Line	Blue Line	Tri-C–Campus District toward Warrensville–Van Aken
through to Waterfront Line	Green Line	Tri-C–Campus District toward Green Road
Settlers Landing toward South Harbor	Waterfront Line	through to Blue and Green Lines
Track layout map
Tower City station track layout
Location

Tower City station, known alternatively as Tower City–Public Square and Tower City Center is a Rapid station in Cleveland, Ohio, part of Tower City Center. It is the central station of the RTA Rapid Transit system, served by all Rapid lines: Blue, Green, Red and Waterfront. The station is located directly beneath Prospect Avenue in the middle of the Avenue shopping mall. The station is only accessible through the Tower City Center shopping complex, and, for this reason, the public concourse of the shopping mall is open at all times that the Cleveland Rapid is in operation.

Located in downtown Cleveland, the station is the busiest RTA Rapid Transit station. It offers connections to all RTA buses serving Public Square. The station also includes the "Walkway to Gateway", a completely enclosed and air-conditioned skyway from Tower City Center to Rocket Arena and Progressive Field of the Gateway Sports and Entertainment Complex that allows RTA passengers, as well as patrons of the Tower City parking facilities, to walk to the arena or ballpark without the need to go outside.

== History ==
The Waterfront Line began service at Tower City on July 10, 1996.

On July 31, 2016, RTA began replacing the track bed for track 8, the main westbound track. In order to prevent service disruptions during the track replacement, RTA temporarily reopened the Shaker rapid track to the public. Westbound trains arrived on that track and temporary platforms and station facilities were set up. The temporary station was not accessible from the main station entrance and had a separate entrance. The new track opened to passengers on November 26, 2016. This station reopened once again on December 28, 2020. This time due to construction on track 13. This construction is scheduled to last until spring 2021. Westbound trains travel on track 7 while eastbound trains travel on track 8 (Red Line's Westbound stop). Blue & Green Line trains don't serve track 7 but still board at track 10. Waterfront Line trains are suspended until construction is completed.

== Station layout ==
The station has two fare-collection entrances, one leading to a low platform station for use by the light rail Green and Blue Lines, and one leading to a high platform station for the heavy rail Red Line. Both entrances open from a lobby located on the lowest level of the Tower City shopping mall, and this lobby is accessible by escalators and elevators from the other levels of the mall. Each entrance has multiple fare gates along with two operator booths. The entrance for the Green and Blue Lines collects fares from passengers entering and leaving the station, since westbound passengers pay their fare upon leaving. The Red Line entrance collects fares from passengers entering the station and also requires arriving passengers to swipe their proof of payment card at the gate in order to exit the station. In order to transfer from the Red Line to the Green or Blue Lines, or vice versa, passengers must exit through the fare gates at one station entrance and enter through the other station entrance. The high and low platform portions of the station could also be reached from each other without going through the lobby by an access ramp located along each side of tracks around the lobby; however, with the implementation of the proof of payment system on the Red Line, the ramps have been closed.

Waterfront trains operate as an extension of select Blue and Green trains, meaning that Waterfront trains departing from Track 8 arrived into the station as Blue or Green trains. Similarly, Blue and Green trains departing from Track 13 arrived into the station as Waterfront trains.

M3	Skylight	Tower City Center access
M2	Street level	Exit/entrance, buses, HealthLine, Public Square
M1	Concourse	Tower City Center access, transfer between Red and Blue/Green/Waterfront lines
RT; Platform level	Track 6	No service
RT; Platform level	Island platform, not in service
RT; Platform level	Track 7	No service
RT; Platform level	Track 8	← Red Line toward Airport (West 25th–Ohio City)		← Waterfront Line toward South Harbor (Settlers Landing)
RT; Platform level	Island platform		Lobby, fare control, exit to Tower City Center	Island platform
RT; Platform level	Track 10	← Red Line toward Airport (West 25th–Ohio City)	Lobby, fare control, exit to Tower City Center	Blue Line toward Warrensville–Van Aken (Tri-C–Campus District) → Green Line toward Green Road (Tri-C–Campus District) →
RT; Platform level	Island platform		Lobby, fare control, exit to Tower City Center	Island platform
RT; Platform level	Track 13	Red Line toward Windermere (Tri-C–Campus District) →		Blue Line toward Warrensville–Van Aken (Tri-C–Campus District) → Green Line toward Green Road (Tri-C–Campus District) →

== Gallery ==
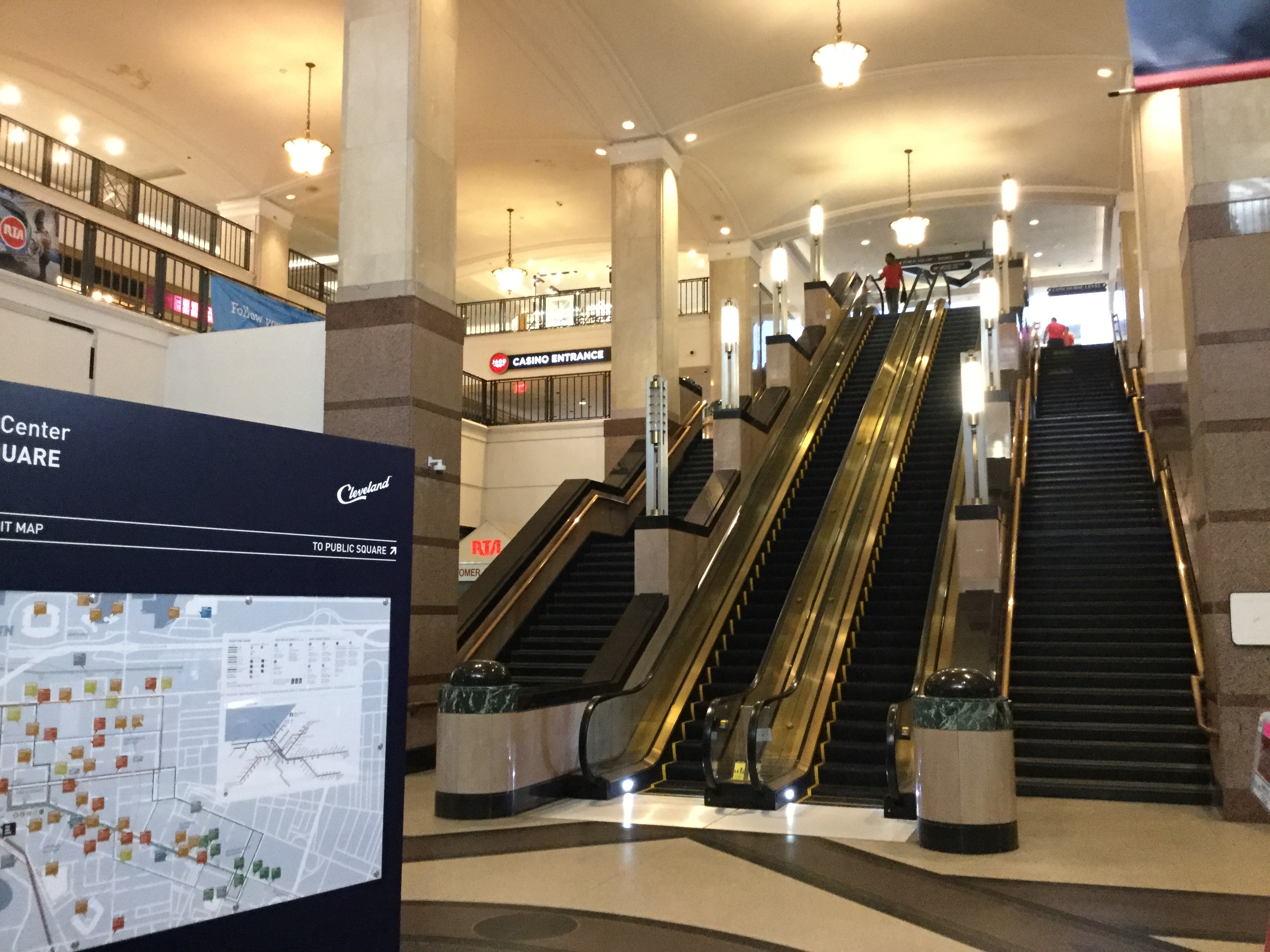
Exit to Tower City Center

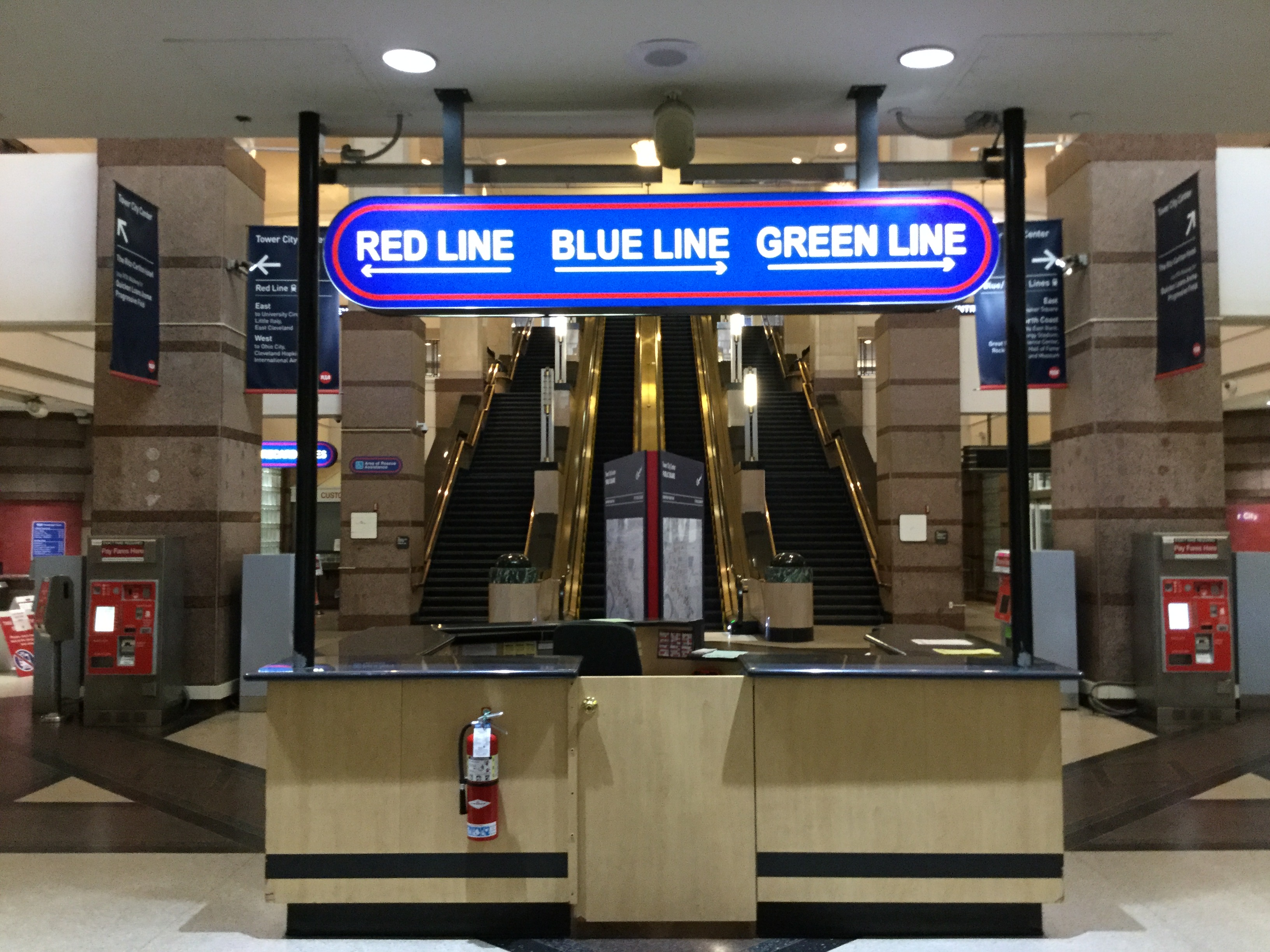
Station navigation

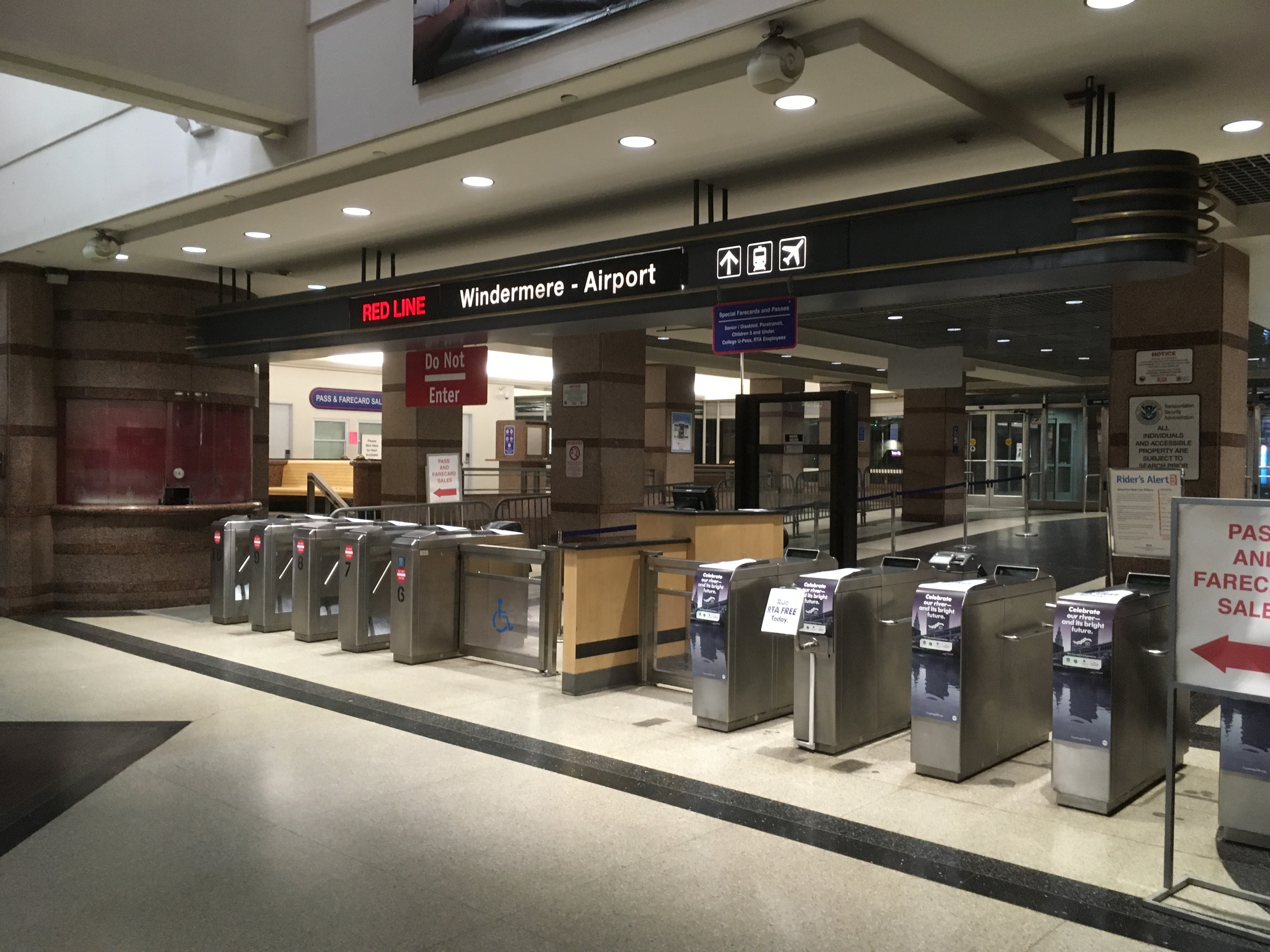
Entrance to the Red Line platforms

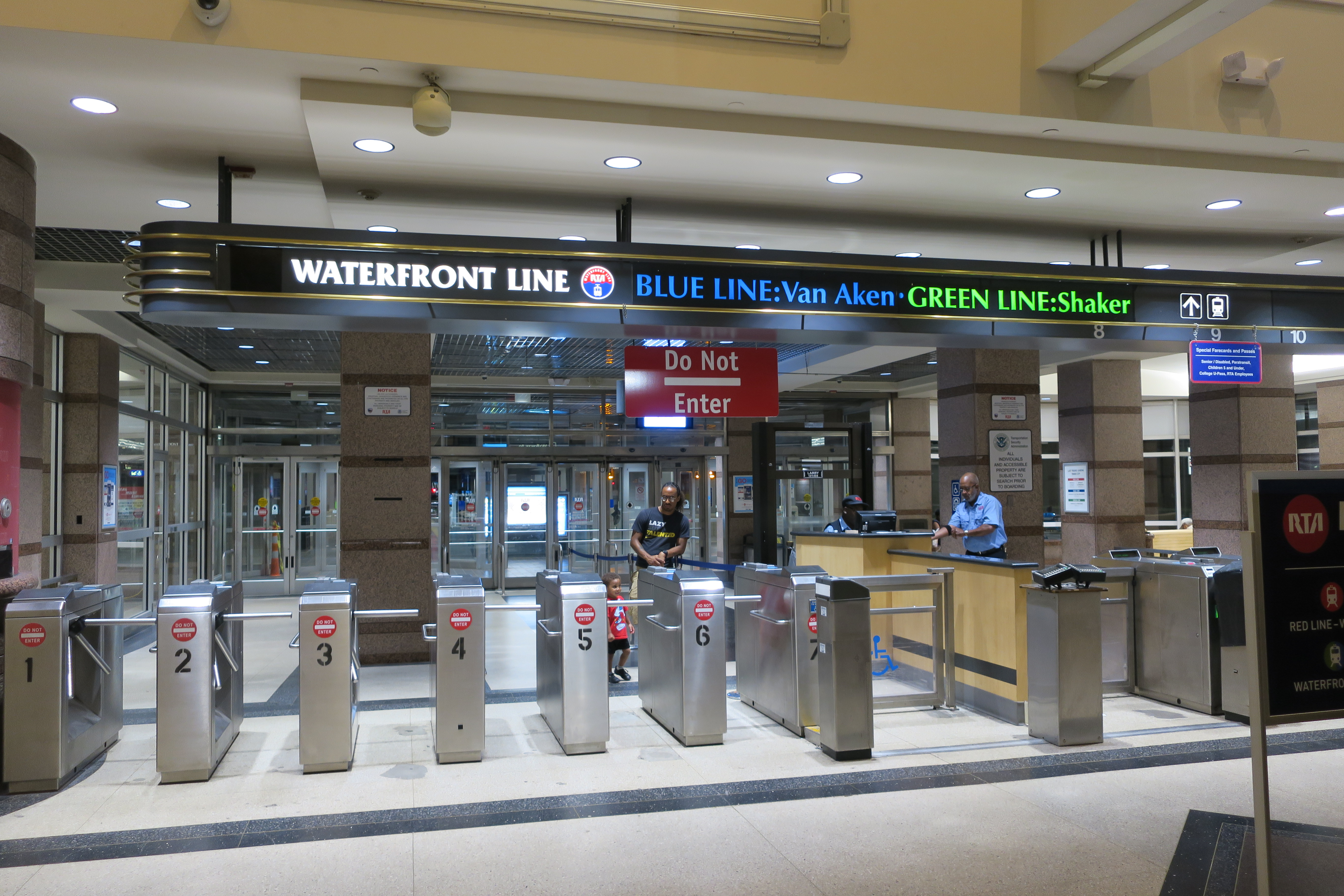
Entrance to the Blue / Green / Waterfront Line platforms

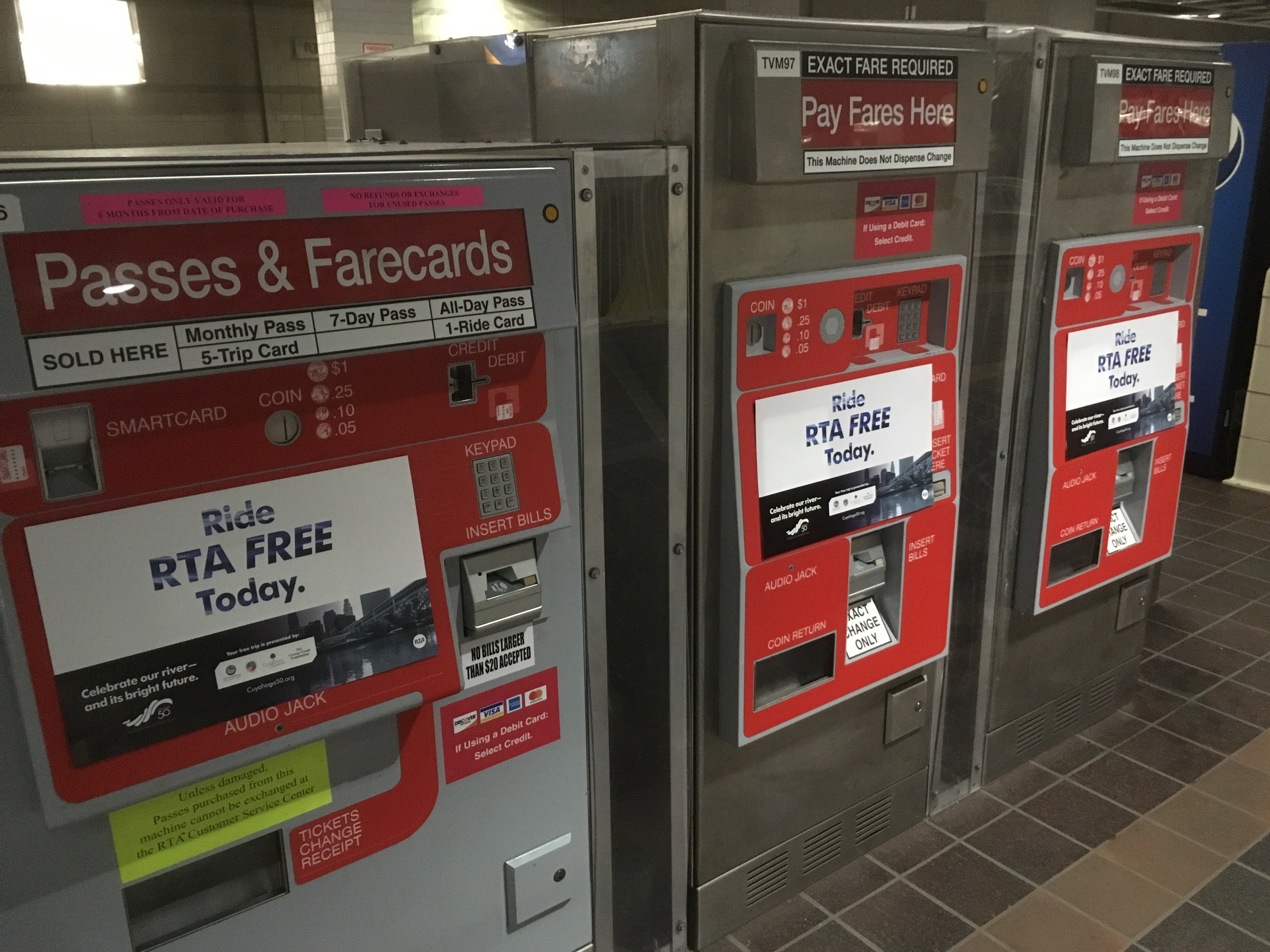
Ticket machines

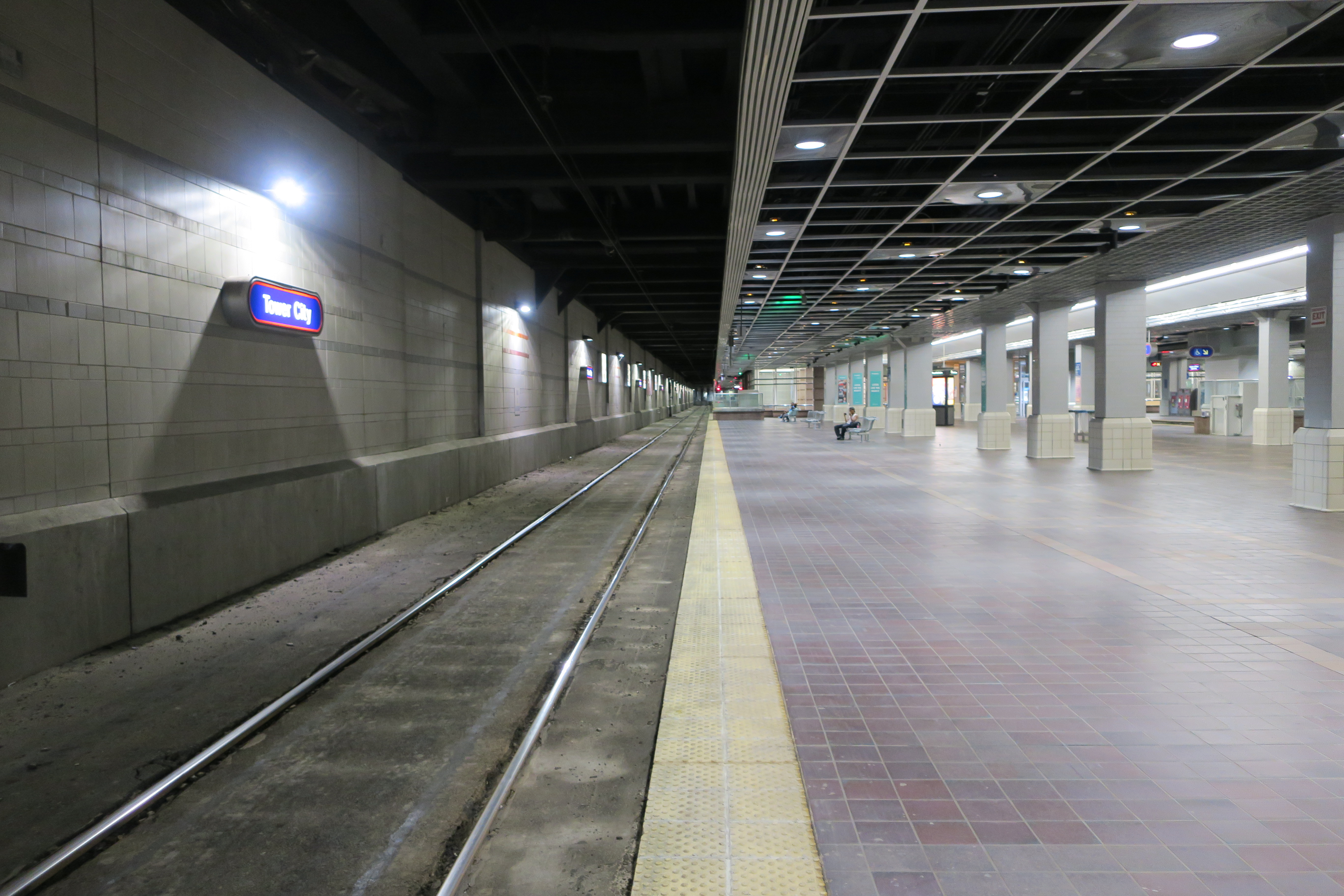
Eastbound Blue/Green Line platforms

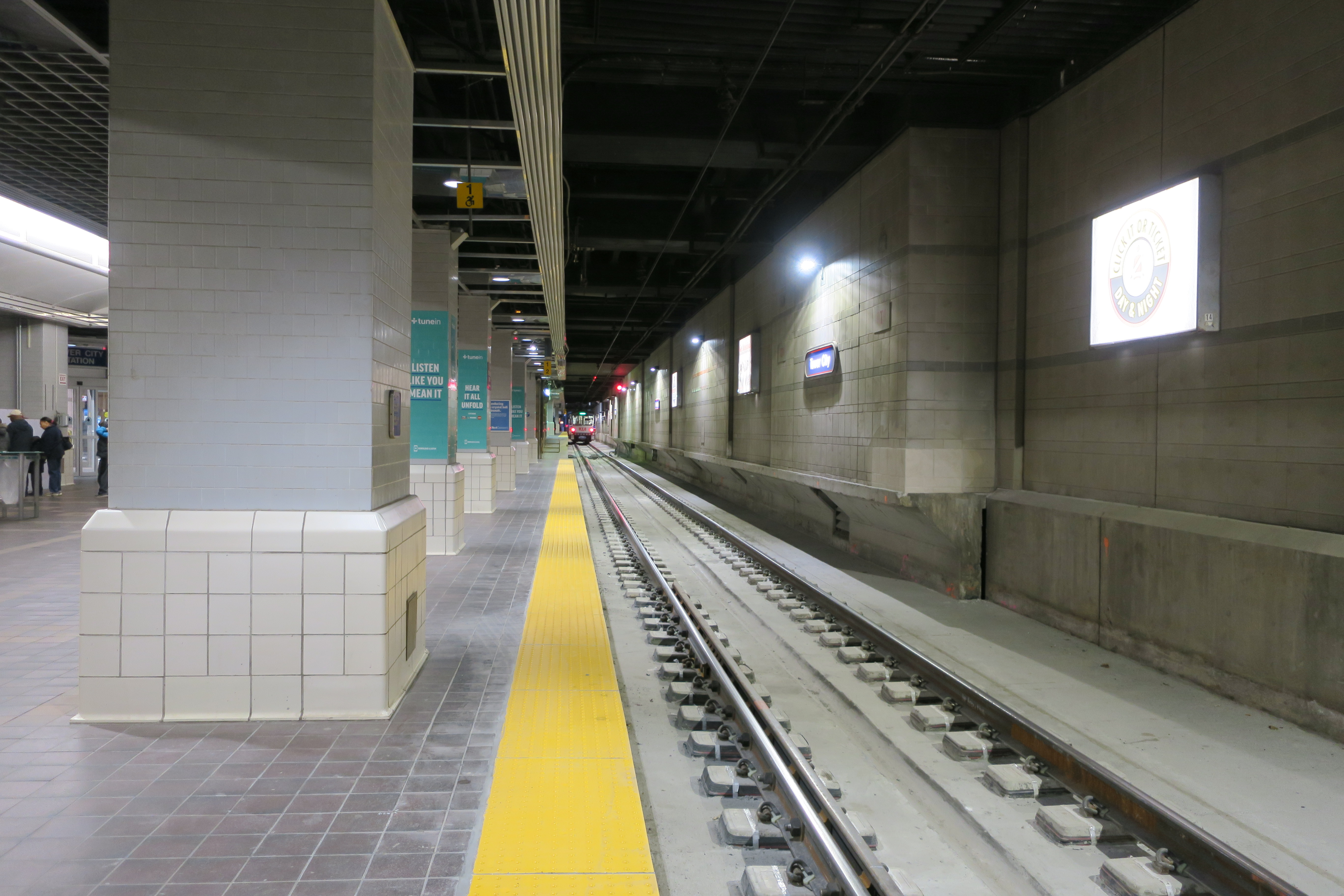
The westbound track on the Blue/Green Line platform

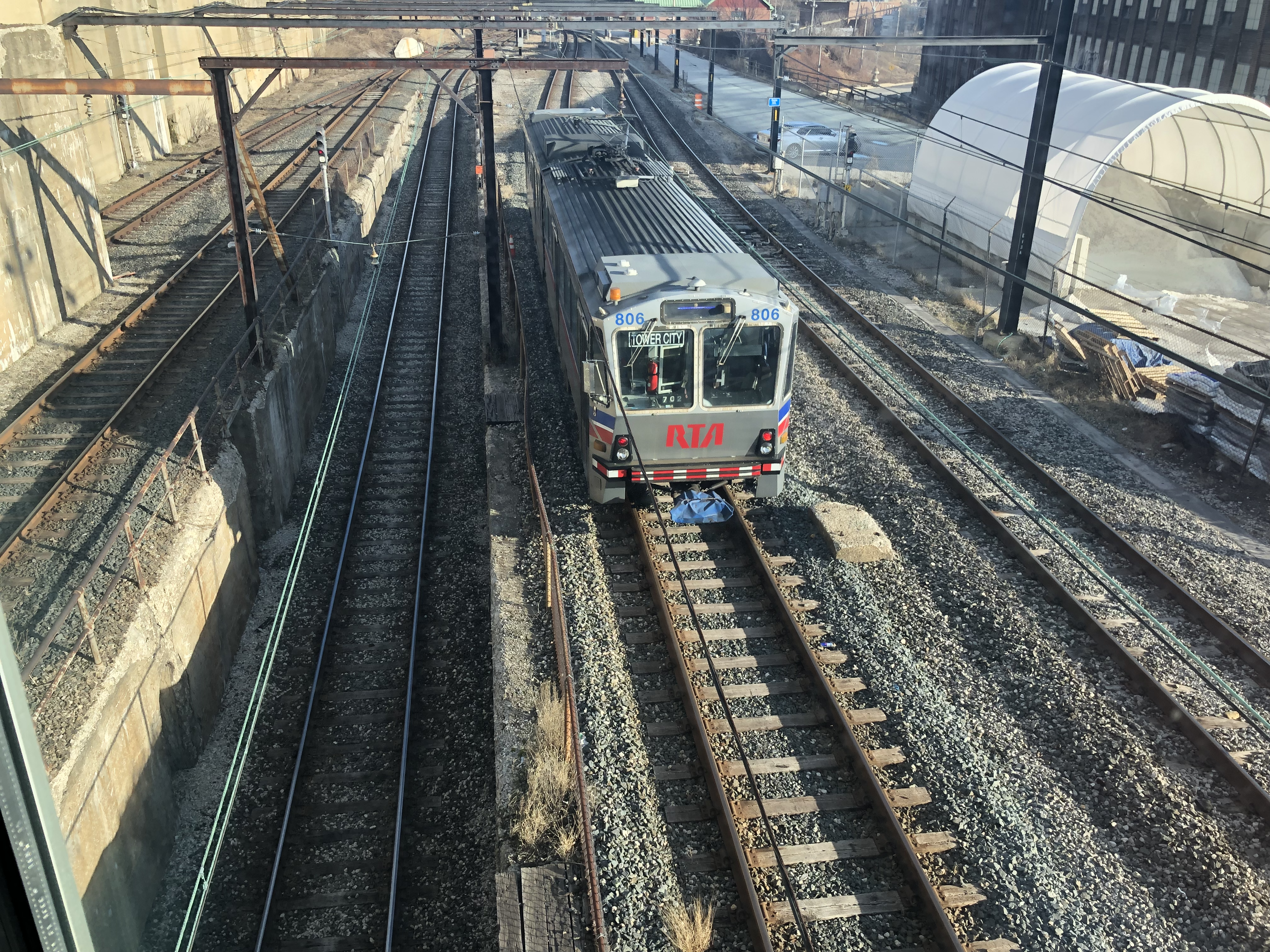
An eastbound Blue Line train departing Tower City
