= Lee–Van Aken station =

Rapid transit station in Cleveland

Lee–Van Aken
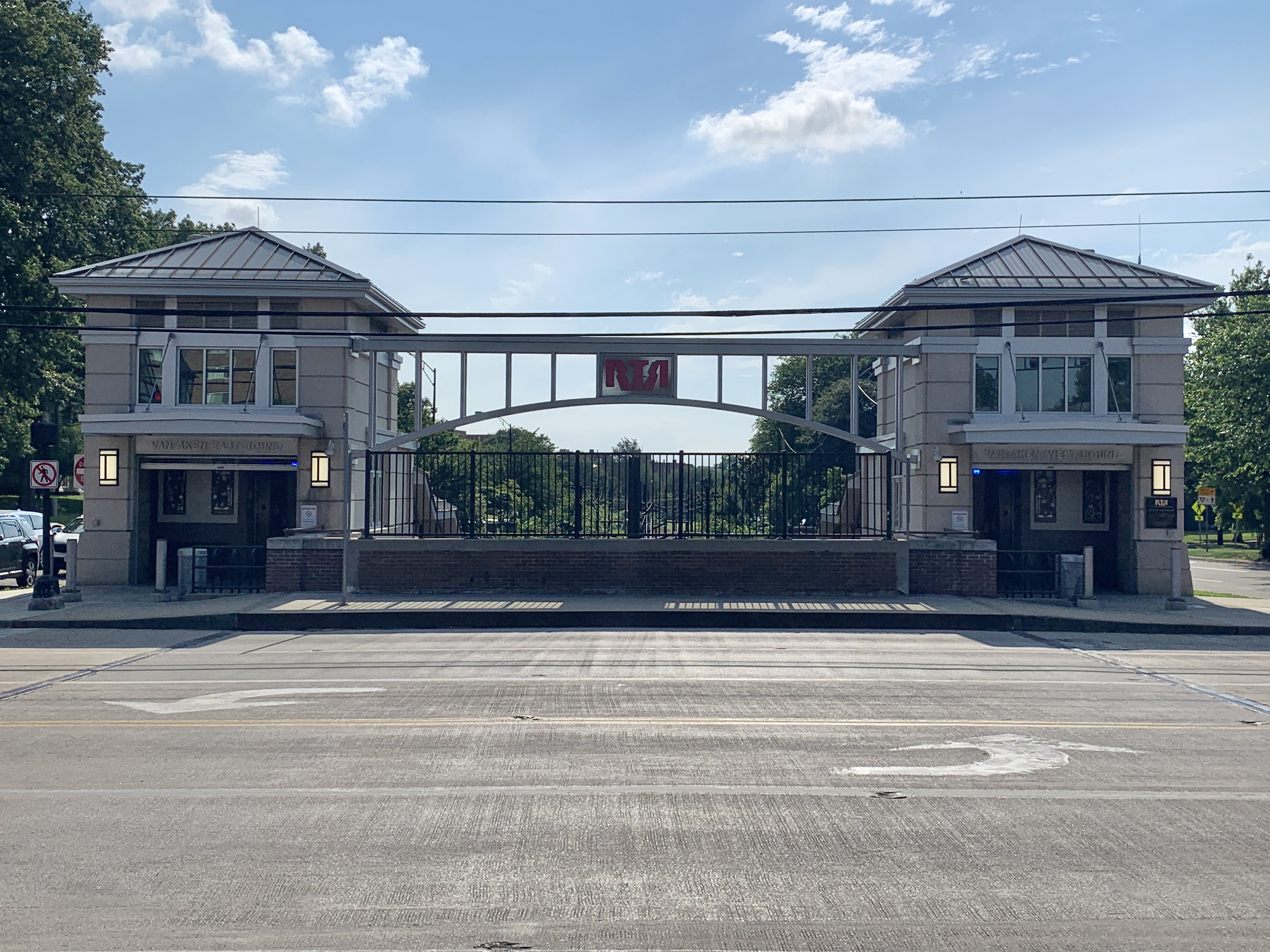
- The entrance to Lee–Van Aken station as seen from Lee Road in July 2021

General information
- Location: 3402 Lee Road; Shaker Heights, Ohio
- Coordinates: 41°27′59″N 81°33′55″W
- Owner: City of Shaker Heights
- Operator: Greater Cleveland Regional Transit Authority
- Line: Van Aken Boulevard
- Platforms: 2 side platforms
- Tracks: 2
- Connections: RTA: 14, 14A, 40

Construction
- Structure type: Below-grade
- Cycle facilities: Racks
- Accessible: Yes

Other information
- Website: riderta.com/facilities/leevanaken

History
- Opened: April 11, 1920; 106 years ago
- Rebuilt: 1981, 2015
- Original company: Cleveland Railway

Services
Preceding station	Rapid Transit	Following station
Ashby toward Tower City	Blue Line	Avalon toward Warrensville–Van Aken
Location

Lee–Van Aken station is a station on the RTA Blue Line in Shaker Heights, Ohio, located in the median of Van Aken Boulevard at its intersection with Lee Road, after which the station is named.

== History ==
The station opened on April 11, 1920, with the initiation of rail service by the Cleveland Interurban Railroad on what is now Van Aken Boulevard from Lynnfield Road to Shaker Square and then to East 34th Street and via surface streets to downtown. The underpass at Lee Road was dictated by an existing creekbed at the site. It is the only grade separation on the Van Aken line.

In 1980 and 1981, the Green and Blue Lines were completely renovated with new track, ballast, poles and wiring, and new stations were built along the line. The renovated line along Van Aken Boulevard opened on October 30, 1981.

In March 2008, architects were selected to design a new station to replace the existing structure. The new station would be accessible passengers with disabilities includes elevators, a larger pedestrian/bus interface point and enhanced safety and security systems. Public art titled "Railway Dream" by American Sculptor Rachel Slick was commissioned for street level entries and East and West bound platforms. Construction began on June 25, 2014, and the rebuilt station opened in December 2015.

== Station layout ==
Unlike most other stations served exclusively by the Blue Line, this station is located in a cut within the median of Van Aken Boulevard just west of the Lee Road overpass. Concrete stairways with canopies and elevators lead from Lee Road down to two side platforms. Each platform has mini-high platforms which allow passengers with disabilities to access trains.

== Gallery ==
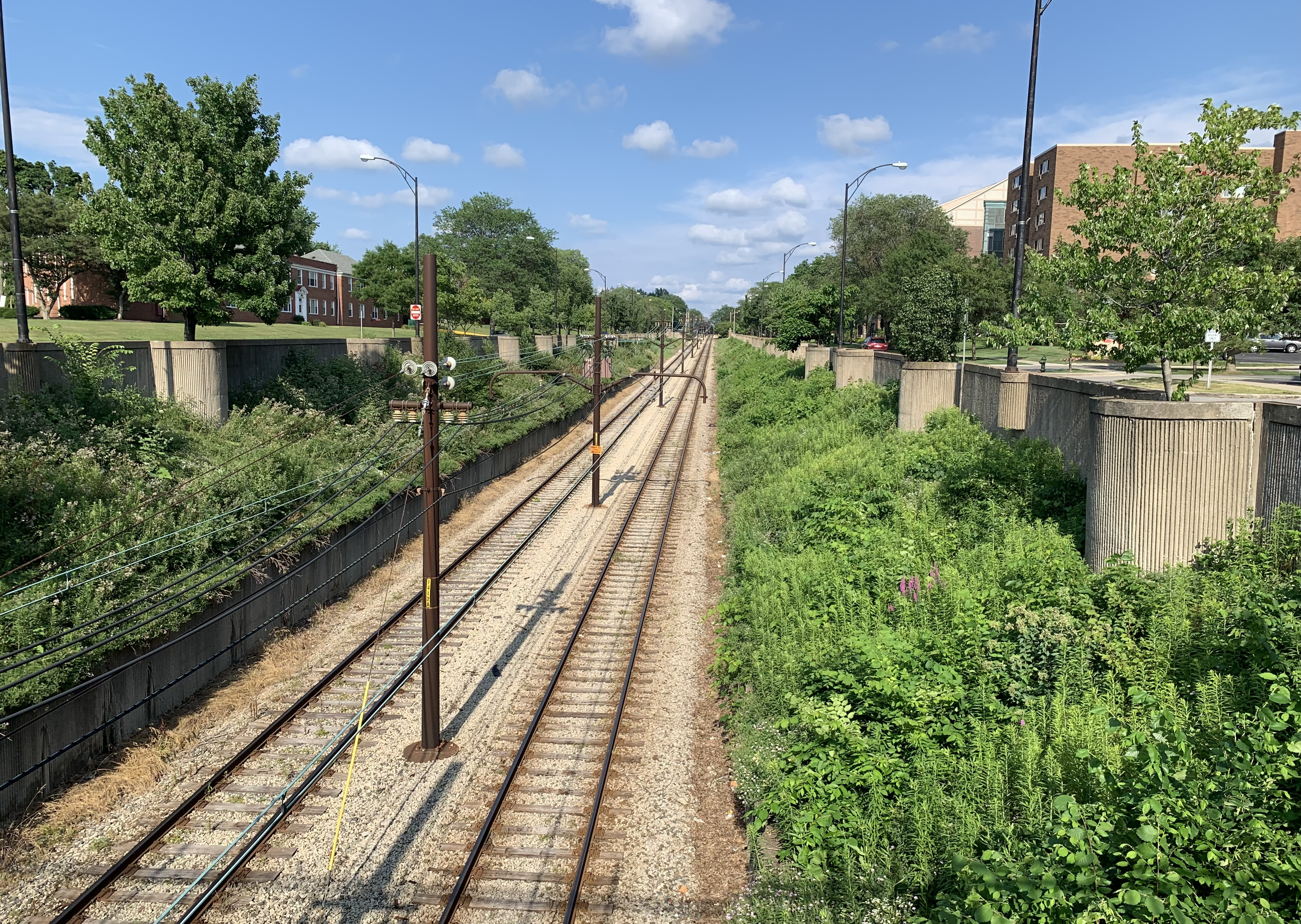
Tracks from below-grade station

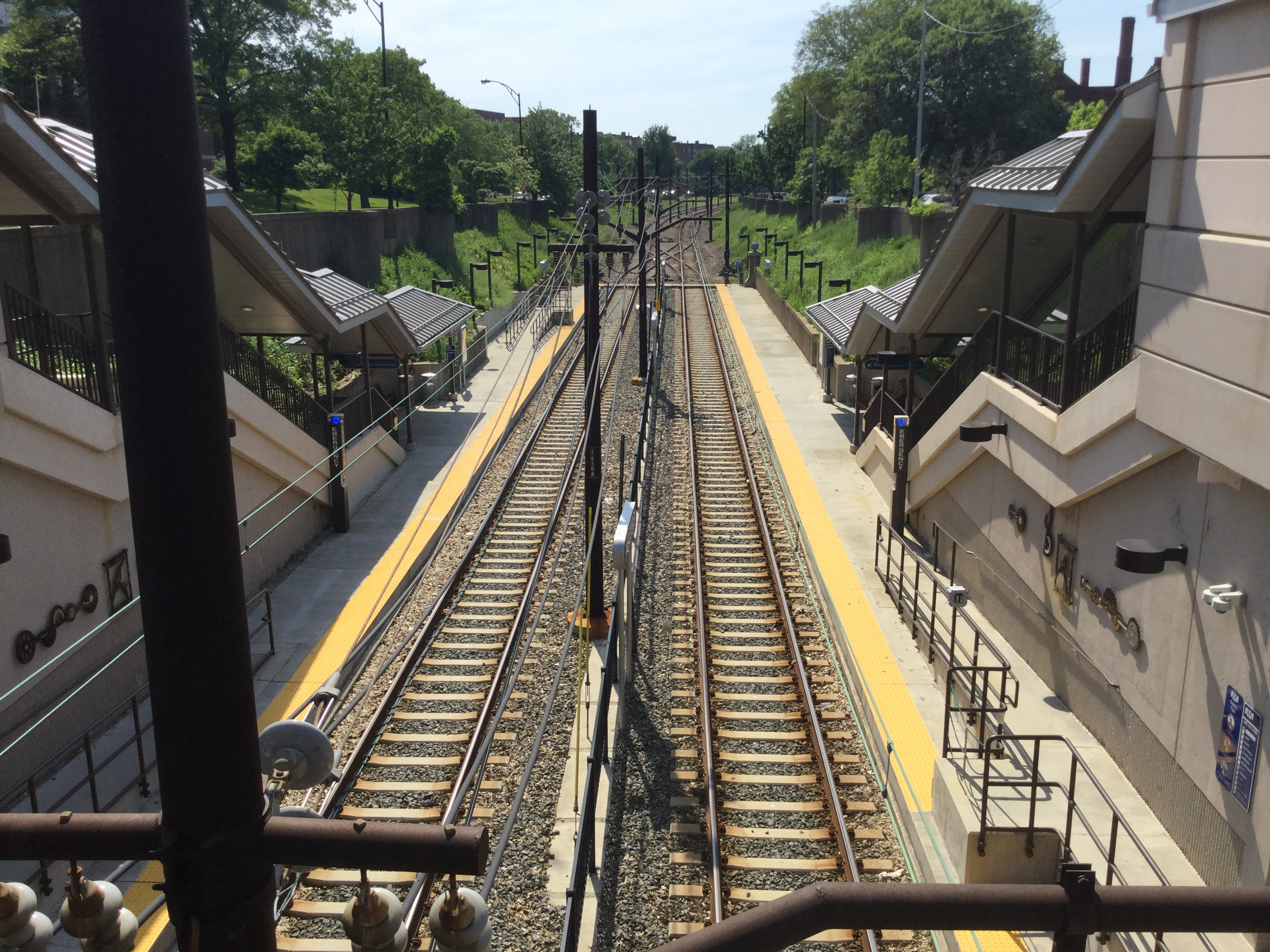
Station platforms

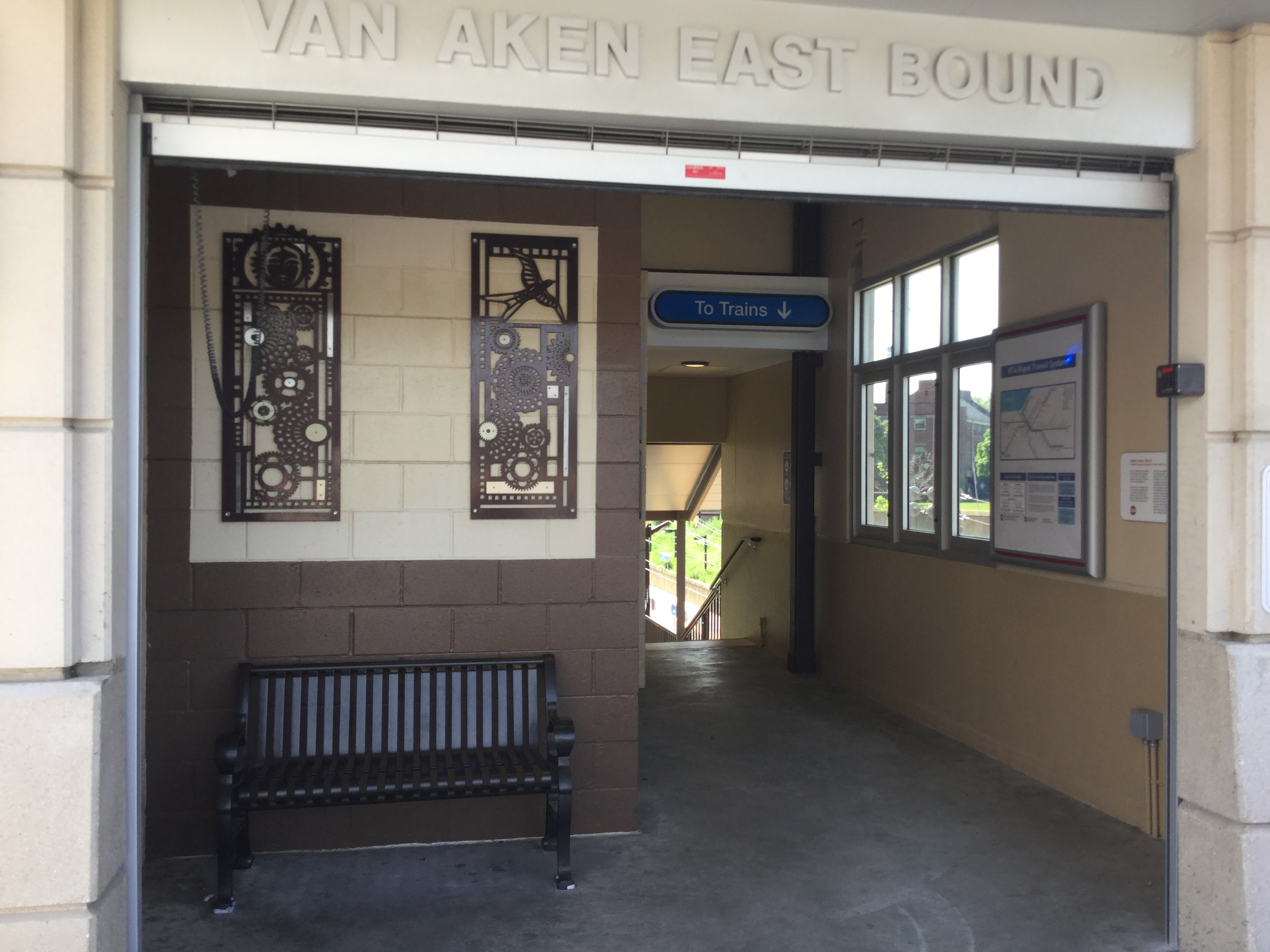
Eastbound station entrance featuring panels of public art collection "Railway Dream" bu Rachel Slick

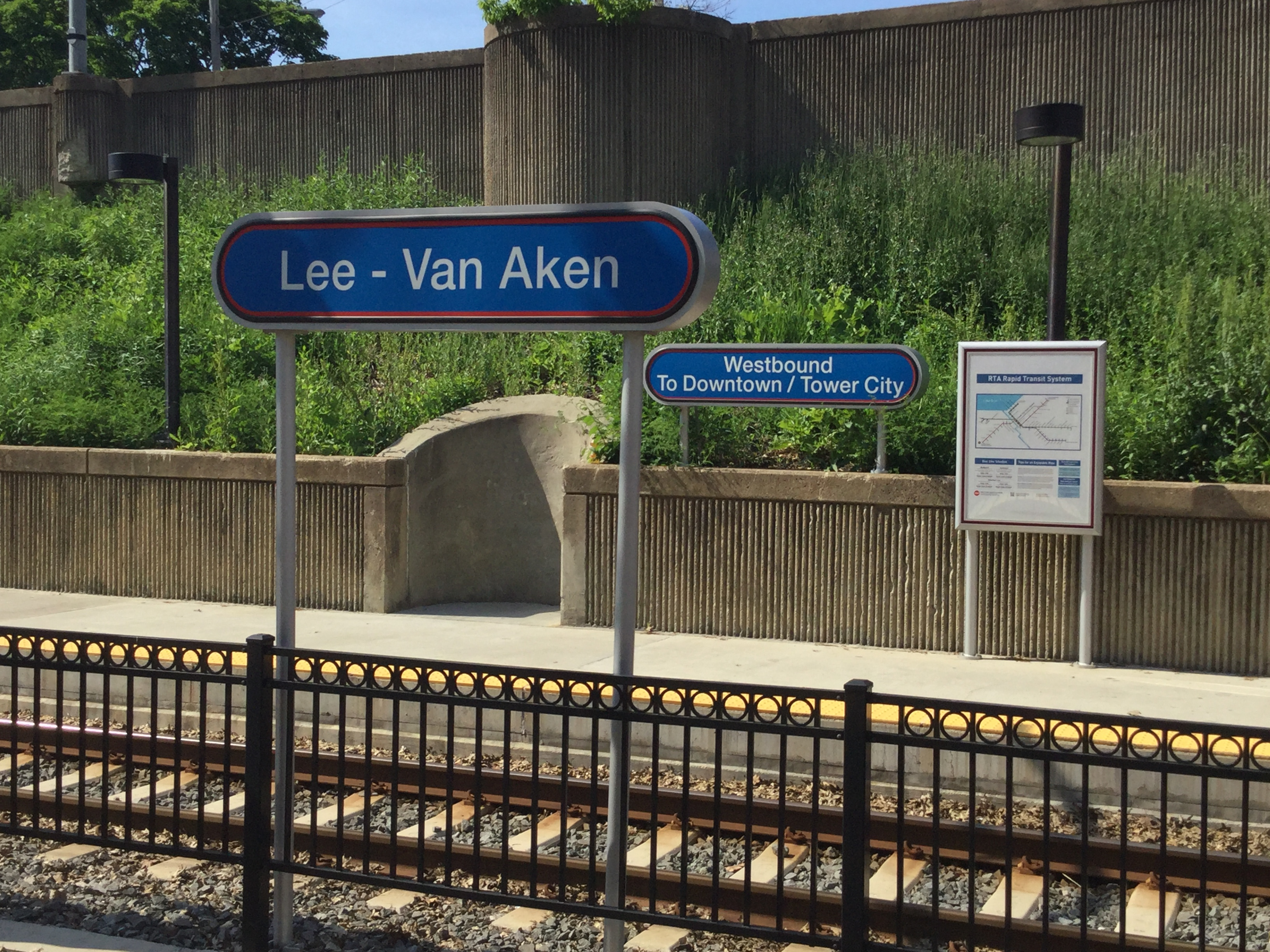
Station signs

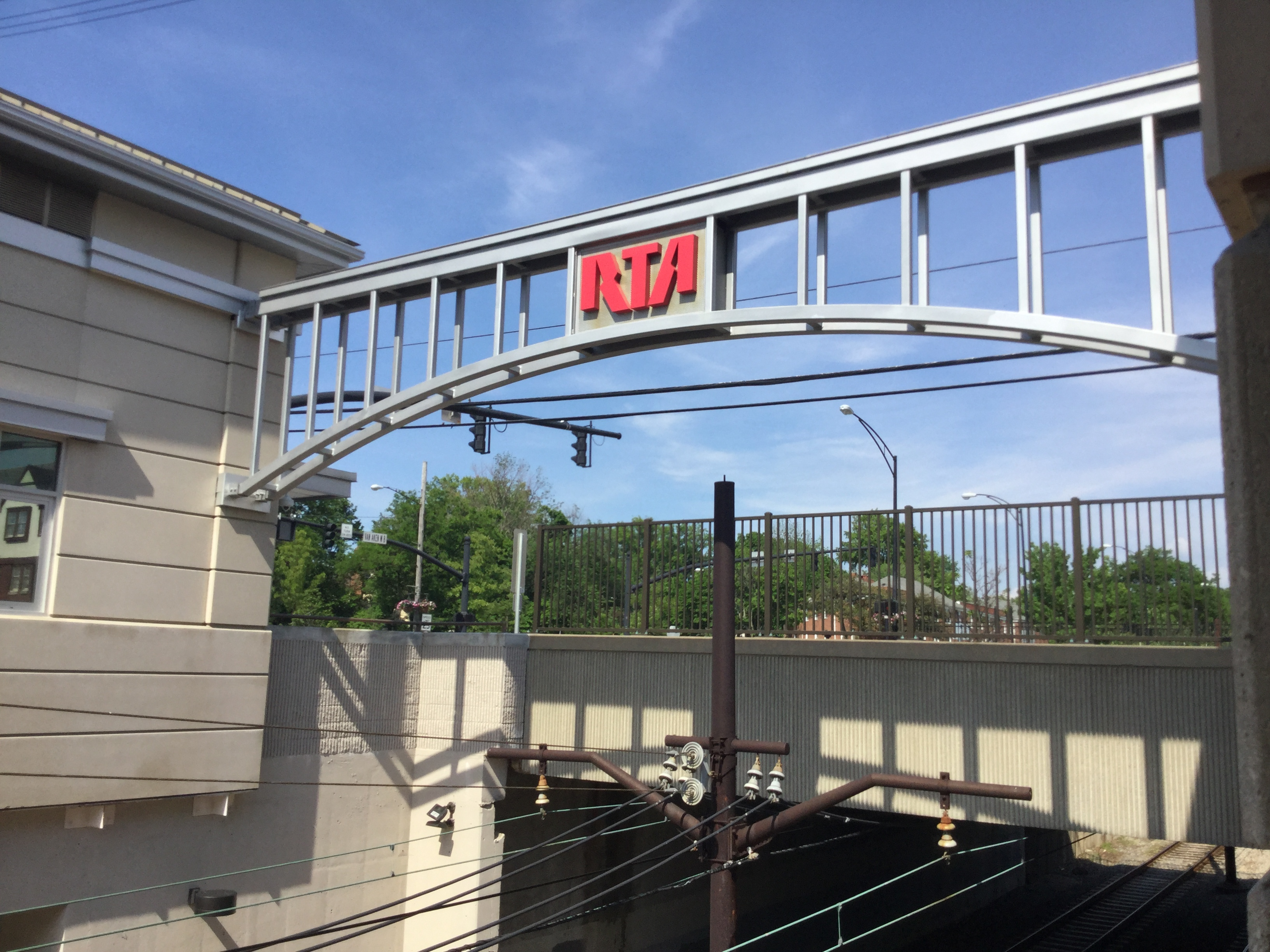
Station arch

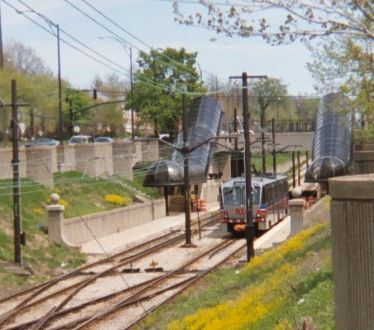
Lee station in 2007

== Notable places nearby ==
- Shaker Heights Public Library
