= Kenmore station (GCRTA) =

Rapid transit station in Cleveland, Ohio, USA

Kenmore
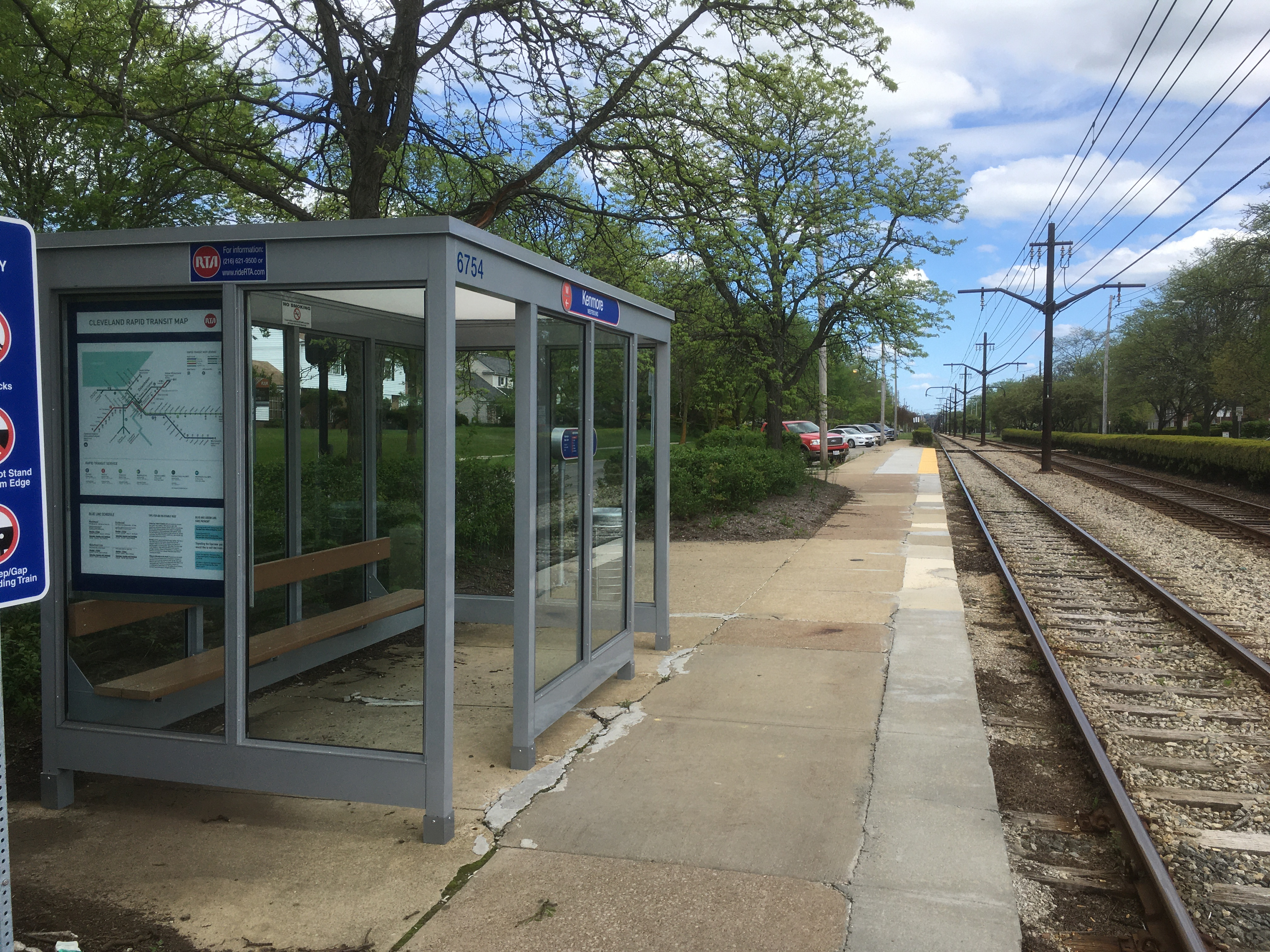
- Kenmore station westbound platform in May 2020

General information
- Location: 18300 Van Aken Boulevard; Shaker Heights, Ohio
- Coordinates: 41°28′0″N 81°33′12″W
- Owner: City of Shaker Heights
- Operator: Greater Cleveland Regional Transit Authority
- Line: Van Aken Boulevard
- Platforms: 2 side platforms
- Tracks: 2

Construction
- Structure type: At-grade
- Parking: 50 spaces
- Accessible: No

Other information
- Website: riderta.com/facilities/kenmore

History
- Opened: April 11, 1920; 106 years ago
- Rebuilt: 1981
- Original company: Cleveland Railway

Services
Preceding station	Rapid Transit	Following station
Avalon toward Tower City	Blue Line	Lynnfield toward Warrensville–Van Aken
Location

Kenmore station is a stop on the RTA Blue Line in Shaker Heights, Ohio, located in the median of Van Aken Boulevard at its intersection with Kenmore Road, after which the station is named, along with Glencairn Road and Ingleside Road.

== History ==
The station opened on April 11, 1920, with the initiation of rail service by the Cleveland Interurban Railroad on what is now Van Aken Boulevard from Lynnfield Road to Shaker Square and then to East 34th Street and via surface streets to downtown.

In 1980 and 1981, the Green and Blue Lines were completely renovated with new track, ballast, poles and wiring, and new stations were built along the line. The renovated line along Van Aken Boulevard opened on October 30, 1981.

== Station layout ==
The station comprises two side platforms, in the center median of Van Aken Boulevard, split across the intersection with Kenmore Road. The westbound platform is located east of the intersection, and the eastbound platform is west of the intersection, with a small shelter on each platform. Diagonal parking is provided on both sides of Van Aken Boulevard adjacent to the westbound platform.
