= Blue Line (RTA Rapid Transit) =

Light rail line of the RTA Rapid Transit system

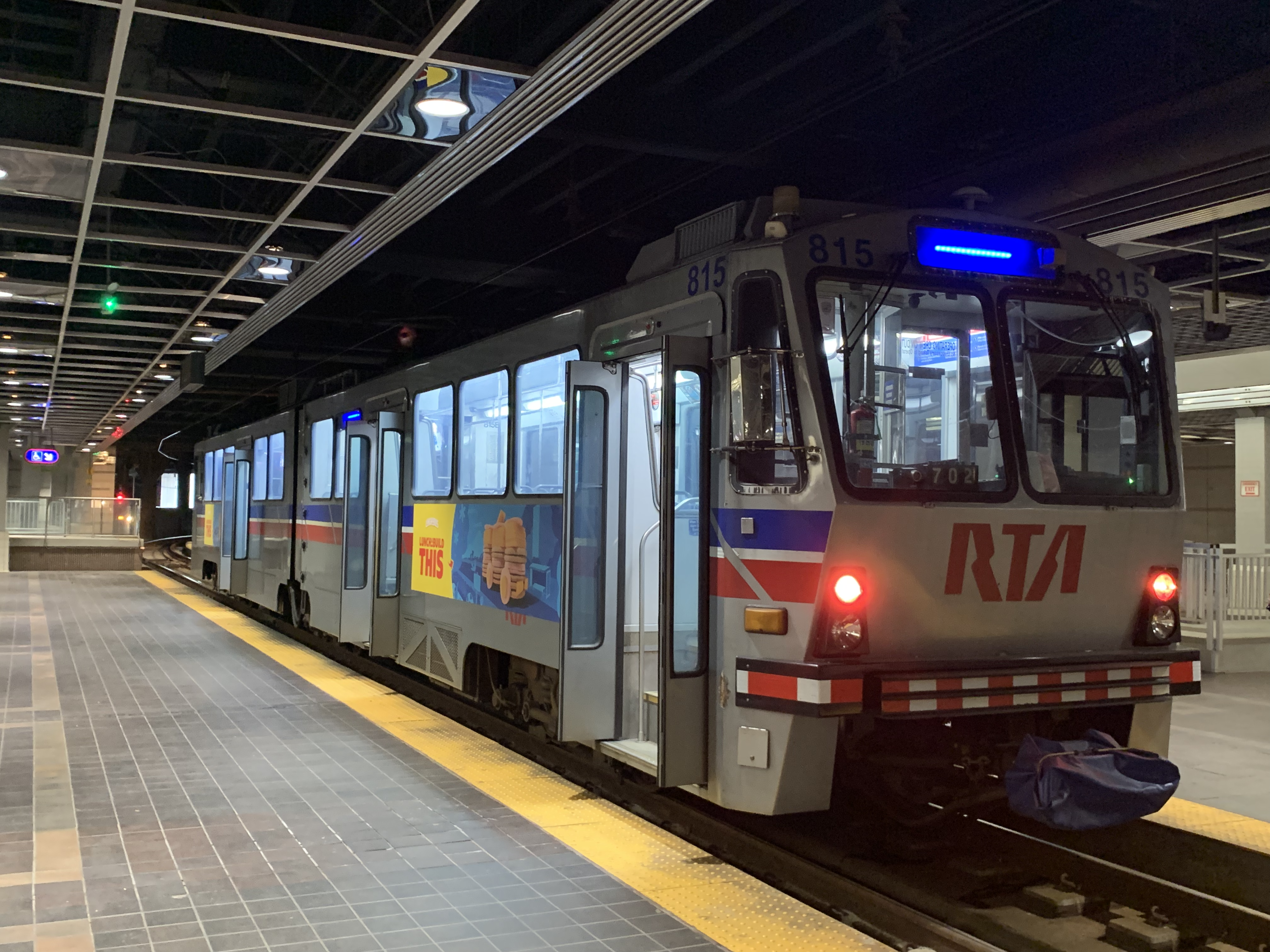
- Blue Line train departing Tower City station

Overview
- Owner: 1920–1930: Cleveland Interurban Railroad; 1930–1935: Metropolitan Utilities; 1935–1944: Union Properties (47%), Guardian Savings and Trust (33%) and Cleveland Trust (20%); 1944–1975: City of Shaker Heights; 1975–present: Greater Cleveland Regional Transit Authority
- Locale: Cleveland and Shaker Heights, Ohio
- Termini: Tower City; Warrensville–Van Aken
- Stations: 18

Service
- Type: Light rail/Tram
- System: RTA Rapid Transit
- Operators: 1920–1930: Cleveland Railway; 1930–1944: Cleveland Interurban Railroad; 1944–1975: City of Shaker Heights; 1975–present: Greater Cleveland Regional Transit Authority

History
- Opened: April 11, 1920

Technical
- Line length: 9.2 mi (14.8 km)
- Number of tracks: 2
- Track gauge: 4 ft 8 1/2 in (1,435 mm) standard gauge
- Electrification: Overhead line, 600 V DC
Route map
Blue Line highlighted in blue

The Rapid Blue Line (formerly known as the Moreland Line and the Van Aken Line, and internally as Route 67) is a light rail line of the RTA Rapid Transit system in Cleveland and Shaker Heights, Ohio, running from Tower City Center downtown, then east and southeast to Warrensville Center Blvd near Chagrin Blvd. 2.6 miles (4.2 km) of track, including two stations (Tri-C–Campus District and East 55th), are shared with the rapid transit Red Line, the stations have low platforms for the Blue Line and high platforms for the Red Line. The Blue Line shares the right-of-way with the Green Line in Cleveland, and splits off after passing through Shaker Square. All RTA light rail lines use overhead lines and pantographs to draw power.

== Route ==
=== Interurban portion ===
From Tower City to just east of East 55th Street, the Blue and Green Lines share track with the Red Line for 2.6 miles (4.2 km) along a private right-of-way originally acquired in 1930 to bring intercity trains into Cleveland Union Terminal (the site of today's Tower City Center). The Tri-C–Campus District station and the East 55th station are shared by the heavy rail rapid transit Red Line and the light rail Blue and Green Lines on the same platform, an arrangement unique in North American rail transit. The shared stations have low platforms for the Blue and Green Lines directly adjacent to high platforms for the Red Line. RTA Central Rail yards and headquarters are located at the East 55th station, where trains of all rail lines are stored and serviced.

East of East 55th, the Blue and Green Lines split from the Red Line and travel east on a separate, dedicated, grade-separated right-of-way. A complex of tunnels existed at this junction to provide means for the Blue and Green Line trains to switch from right to left side running from East 55th to Tower City, but right side running is now used throughout the system, and the tunnels have been closed.

The private right of way extends from this junction to Woodhill Road at the western end of Shaker Boulevard and then below grade through an excavated cut in the median of Shaker Boulevard to Shaker Square. Along this portion of the lines are East 79th station, Woodhill station and East 116th Station. The lines then rise to street level at Shaker Square.

=== Suburban portion ===
From Shaker Square eastward, both lines enter Shaker Heights and operate at street level with grade crossings, reflecting this portion of the lines' history as streetcar lines. The Blue Line separates from the Green Line just east of Shaker Square. Van Aken Boulevard branches off from Shaker Boulevard at this point and follows the Blue Line. The station-stops east of Shaker Square are adjacent to street intersections and consist mostly of concrete platforms with bus shelters. The Blue Line descends at Lee Road; an excavated cut under a bridge carrying Lee Road over the tracks. The line terminates at Warrensville Road and Van Aken Boulevard.

== Service description ==
=== Hours and frequency ===
Blue Line trains operate every 30 minutes from approximately 4:00 a.m. to 12:30 a.m. daily.

=== Rail Replacement Bus ===
During rail shutdowns, RTA uses the replacement bus designation "67R".

=== Rolling stock ===
The Blue and Green Lines use a fleet of 48 light rail vehicles (LRVs) manufactured by Breda Costruzioni Ferroviarie in 1980 and 1981. Each car is 77.13 feet (23,509 mm) long, 11.32 feet (3,450 mm) high, and 9.3 feet (2,835 mm) wide and is articulated with operator cabs at each end, seating 84 passengers. The units are numbered 801–848. RTA needs 17 cars to operate currently scheduled service. Around 2005, RTA renovated up to 34 cars with the hope of making them last for another 15 years.

=== Stations ===
The following is the complete list of stations, from west to east.

Station	Handicapped/disabled access	Date opened	Location	Connections / notes
Tower City	Handicapped/disabled access	July 20, 1930	Downtown	RTA Rapid Transit: Green Red Waterfront; RTA BRT: HealthLine, Cleveland State Line (55, 55B, 55C); RTA Bus: 1, 3, 8, 9, 11, 14, 14A, 15, 19, 19A, 19B, 22, 25, 26, 26A, 39, 45, 51, 51A, 53, 53A, 71, 77, 90, 251; Laketran: 10, 11, 12; METRO RTA: 61; PARTA: 100; SARTA: 4
Tri-C–Campus District	Handicapped/disabled access	July 20, 1930	Central	RTA Rapid Transit: Green Red; RTA Bus: 15, 19, 19A, 19B
East 55th	Handicapped/disabled access	April 11, 1920	North Broadway	RTA Rapid Transit: Green Red; RTA Bus: 16; Park and ride: 50 spaces
East 79th		April 11, 1920	Kinsman	RTA Rapid Transit: Green; RTA Bus: 2
Buckeye–Woodhill	Handicapped/disabled access	April 11, 1920	Kinsman/Woodland Hills	RTA Rapid Transit: Green; RTA Bus: 8, 10; Park and ride: 60 spaces
East 116th–St. Luke's	Handicapped/disabled access	April 11, 1920	Woodland Hills	RTA Rapid Transit: Green; RTA Bus: 50
Shaker Square	Handicapped/disabled access	April 11, 1920	Buckeye–Shaker	RTA Rapid Transit: Green; RTA Bus: 8, 48
Drexmore		January 23, 1948	Buckeye–Shaker	Park and ride: 65 spaces
South Woodland		April 11, 1920	Buckeye–Shaker/Shaker Heights	Park and ride: 74 spaces
Southington		April 11, 1920	Shaker Heights	Park and ride: 25 spaces
Onaway		April 11, 1920	Shaker Heights	Park and ride: 28 spaces
Ashby		April 11, 1920	Shaker Heights	Park and ride: 29 spaces
Lee–Van Aken	Handicapped/disabled access	April 11, 1920	Shaker Heights	RTA Bus: 40
Avalon		April 11, 1920	Shaker Heights	Park and ride: 95 spaces
Kenmore		April 11, 1920	Shaker Heights	Park and ride: 50 spaces
Lynnfield		April 11, 1920	Shaker Heights	Park and ride: 157 spaces
Farnsleigh	Handicapped/disabled access	July 30, 1930	Shaker Heights	Park and ride: 140 spaces
Warrensville–Van Aken	Handicapped/disabled access	July 30, 1930	Shaker Heights	RTA Bus: 14, 14A, 41, 41F

== History ==
RTA light rail expansion
Rail service was extended from Attleboro to Courtland	The Moreland division of the rapid opened, along with the private right-of-way to downtown	Cleveland Union Terminal opened to Shaker trains, both rail divisions were extended east to Warrensville Center Road	
1913 to 1920	1920 to 1928 Legend	1928 to 1930	
The Shaker Division was extended to Green Road	The CTS Rapid Line opened, Drexmore station opened	The lines were redesigned with colors, the downtown terminal was rebuilt	
1930 to 1936 Legend	1936 to 1948 Legend	1948 to 1975 Legend	1978 to 1990 Legend

The Blue Line is the direct, continuously operating descendant of the privately owned Cleveland Interurban Railroad and later the municipally owned Shaker Heights Rapid Transit, it connected the streetcar suburb of Shaker Heights to downtown Cleveland. This line and the Green Line were the only ones to survive the bustitution of Cleveland's transit system, partly due to their use of grade-separated trackage to across much of the east side of Cleveland.

=== Cleveland & Youngstown Railroad ===
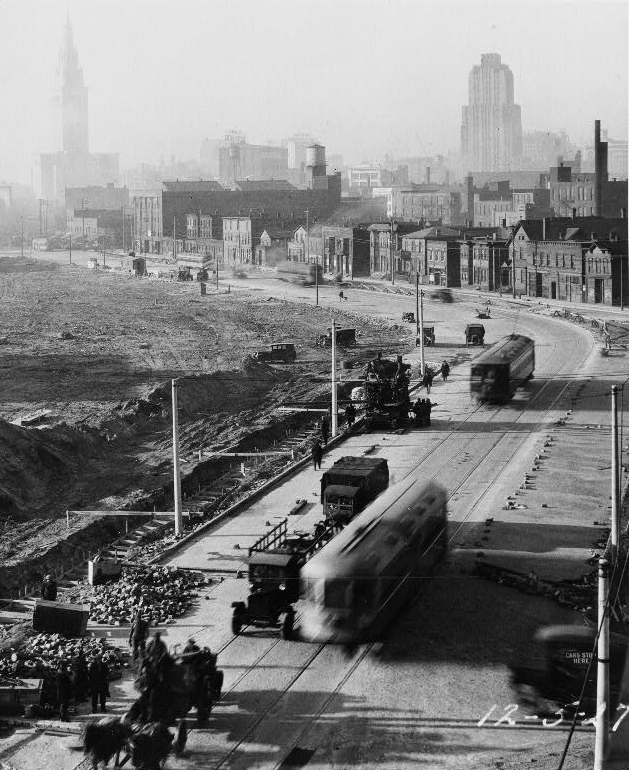
A rapid car between Public Square and East 55th station in 1927

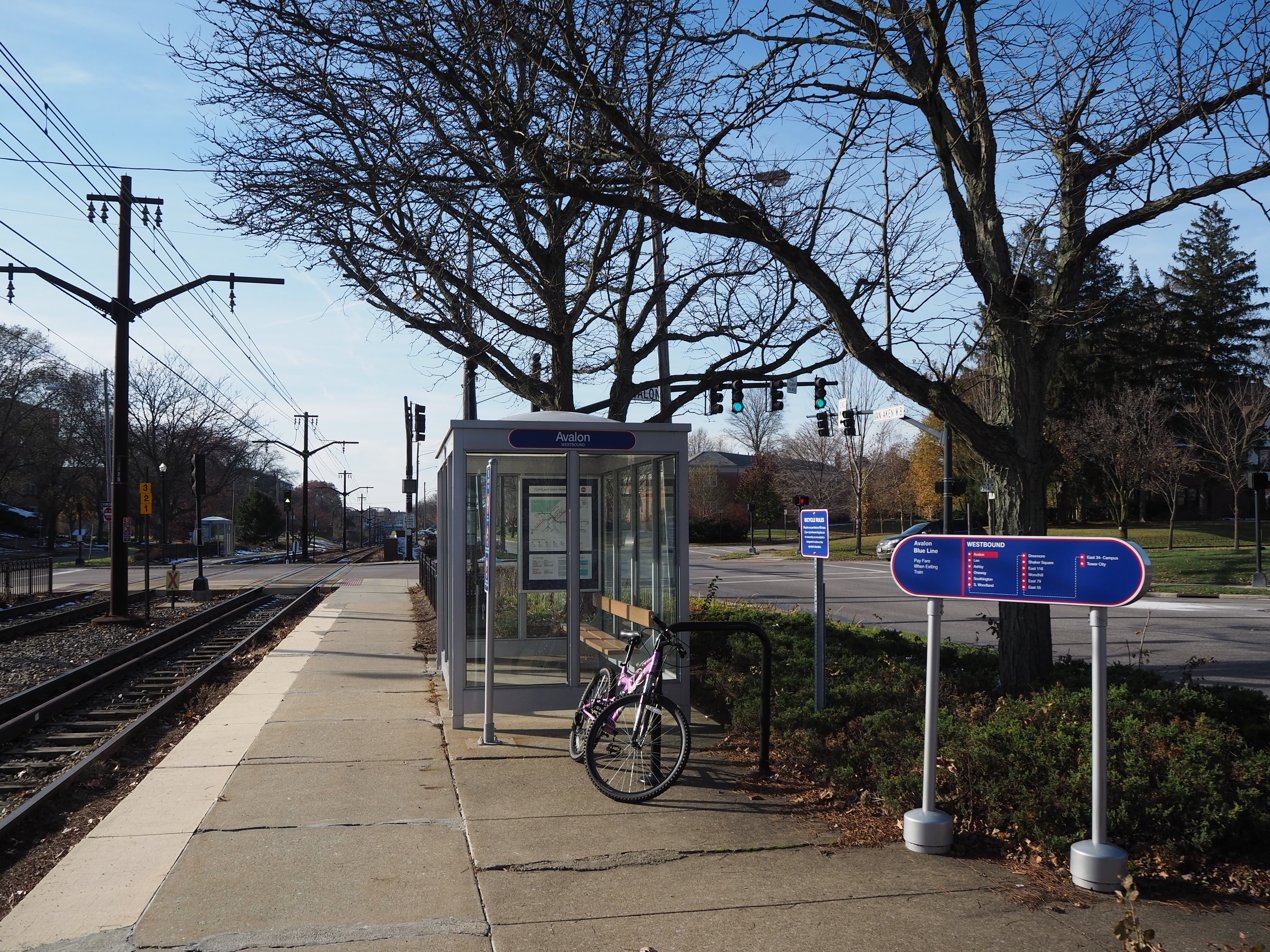
A refurbished stop at Avalon Road

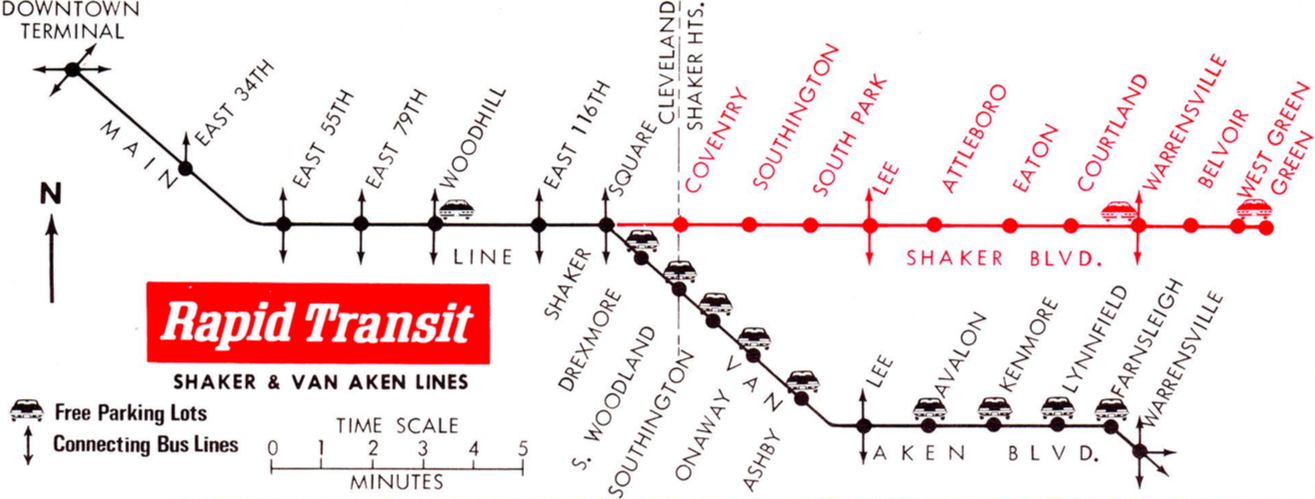
Map of the Shaker Heights Rapid Transit from early 1975

As construction progressed on what is now known as the Green Line in Shaker Heights, the Van Sweringens realized that the connection to the Cleveland Railway's streetcar system through Cleveland Heights resulted in a slow trip to downtown. They planned for a grade-separated right-of-way all the way to downtown that could significantly reduce travel times for commuters, and thus increase the desirability of their suburb. In 1915 they acquired a majority interest in the New York, Chicago and St. Louis Railroad (the Nickel Plate Road), mainly to allow for a line next to a relocated NYC&StL.

=== Cleveland Interurban Railroad ===
The Van Sweringens rapid line officially opened on April 11, 1920, running west from Lynnfield Road, down the median of Moreland (later renamed Van Aken) Boulevard, turning northwest and merging with Shaker Boulevard. It continued down the median of the new Shaker Boulevard to Woodhill Road, then across the Cleveland Short Line Railway (New York Central Railroad) and alongside a CSL branch to East 55th Street. West of East 55th Street, where the CSL branch crossed over the parallel Nickel Plate, the new streetcar line also crossed the Nickel Plate, continuing west between the branch and Nickel Plate, then up a ramp to the intersection of the Kingsbury Viaduct (East 34th Street) and Broadway. From there, the CIRR cars traveled along the tracks of Cleveland Railway's Broadway line, using street-running for the remainder of the trip downtown.

Initially, the Shaker Line and the Vans' Rapid operated independently of each other. A connection was made between Coventry and the junction of Shaker and (Van Aken) on August 16, 1920. This change allowed through service on the main line from East 34th to Courtland, and eventually made the old line through Cleveland Heights redundant. In 1928, the Shaker Boulevard line was extended east from Courtland Boulevard to Warrensville Center Road.

As the Van Sweringens' railroad plans grew, they constructed a new Union Terminal for Cleveland. Cleveland Union Terminal (CUT) opened in 1930, along with a new grade-separated right-of-way with side-by-side lines for steam railroads and interurban streetcars, including the CIRR. Although their plans for another interurban line never materialized (the right-of-way was later used for the Red Line), the CIRR immediately began operations via the new right-of-way into the north part of CUT specially reserved for interurban train service. The CIRR no longer needed to run on city streetcar tracks and the ramp to Broadway and East 34th Street was removed. The first CIRR trains rolled into CUT on July 20. On the same day, the line was extended to its present terminus at Warrensville Road.

=== Shaker Heights Rapid Transit ===
On September 6, 1944, the City of Shaker Heights took over the financially struggling line and began operating it as a part of the Shaker Heights Rapid Transit. The city lacked funds for major line extensions. However, it did modernize the fleet with the purchase of PCC cars beginning in 1947.

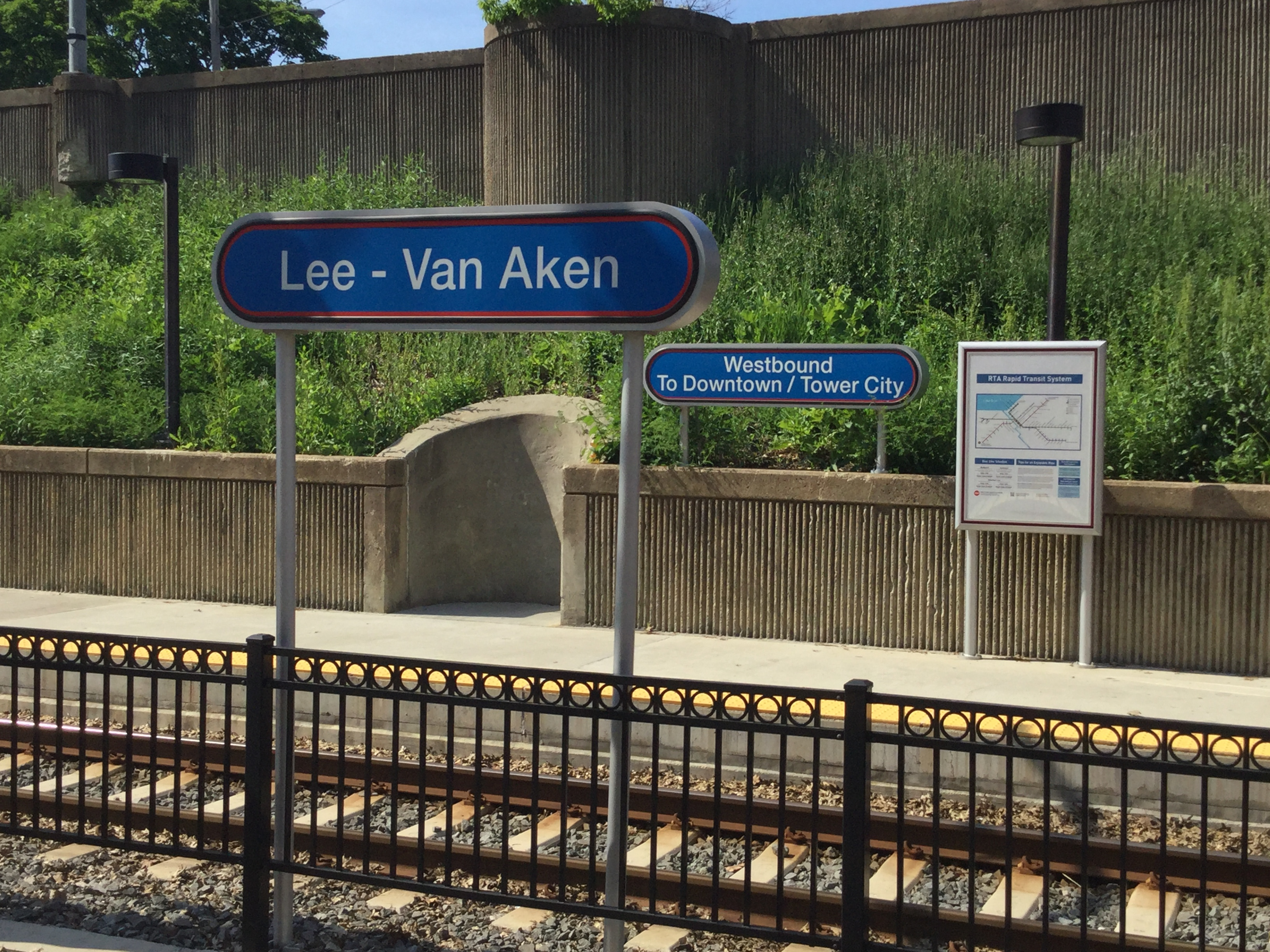
Lee-Van Aken station

In 1955 the Cleveland Transit System (which was formed in 1942 when the City of Cleveland took over the Cleveland Railway Company) opened the first section of the city's new rapid transit line, now known as the Red Line. The first section of the CTS rapid transit east from Cleveland Union Terminal included 2.6 miles (4.2 km) and two stations shared with the Shaker Heights Rapid Transit line, necessitating split platforms with low-level sections (for Shaker Heights rapid transit cars) and high-level sections (for CTS rapid transit cars).

=== Greater Cleveland Regional Transit Authority ===
By the 1970s the City of Shaker Heights was struggling to maintain the Shaker Heights Rapid Transit and in Cleveland, CTS was facing financial problems with its rapid transit and bus system. Significant federal money was available, but only if a regional transit system was formed. In 1974, the Greater Cleveland Regional Transit Authority (RTA) was organized to take over the municipal transit system in Cleveland and others throughout Cuyahoga County. Voters approved a county-wide sales tax increase to help subsidize the transit system and RTA officially took over the Shaker Heights Rapid Transit lines on July 14, 1975. On September 30, 1979, RTA adopted a new designation for the rapid transit lines. The Airport-Windermere Line became the Red Line, while the Shaker Rapid Transit lines (Shaker and Van Aken) became the Green and Blue Lines.

In 1981, RTA undertook a complete renovation of the Blue Line, with new track, ballast, poles and overhead wiring. Existing station shelters were demolished and new shelters were constructed. The project necessitated closing the Blue Line east of Shaker Square for most of the summer of 1981, with substitute bus shuttles and single-tracking along the remainder of the line from East 55th Street to Shaker Square. To run on the renovated line, a fleet of new LRVs were purchased from an Italian firm, Breda Costruzioni Ferroviarie, to replace the aging PCC cars. The new line was dedicated on October 30, 1981.

From August 20 to September 30, 2023, the Blue and Green Lines were suspended due to track, signal and station work. In May 2024, the Federal Transit Administration awarded RTA $16 million to construct accessible platforms at eight Blue Line stations, making the full line accessible.
