= Ashby Station =

Ashby Station may refer to:

- Ashby station (BART); a BART station in Berkeley, California
- Ashby station (GCRTA); a light rail station in Cleveland, Ohio
- Ashby station (MARTA); a MARTA station in Atlanta, Georgia

== See also ==
- Ashby de la Zouch railway station closed 1964
