= Lynnfield =

Lynnfield may refer to

- Lynnfield, Massachusetts, a town in Essex County, Massachusetts
- Lynnfield (microprocessor), a CPU made by Intel
- Lynnfield (RTA Rapid Transit station), a light rail station in Shaker Heights, Ohio

== See also ==
- Lynfield, New Zealand, a suburb of Auckland
