= Farnsleigh station =

Rapid transit station in Cleveland

Farnsleigh
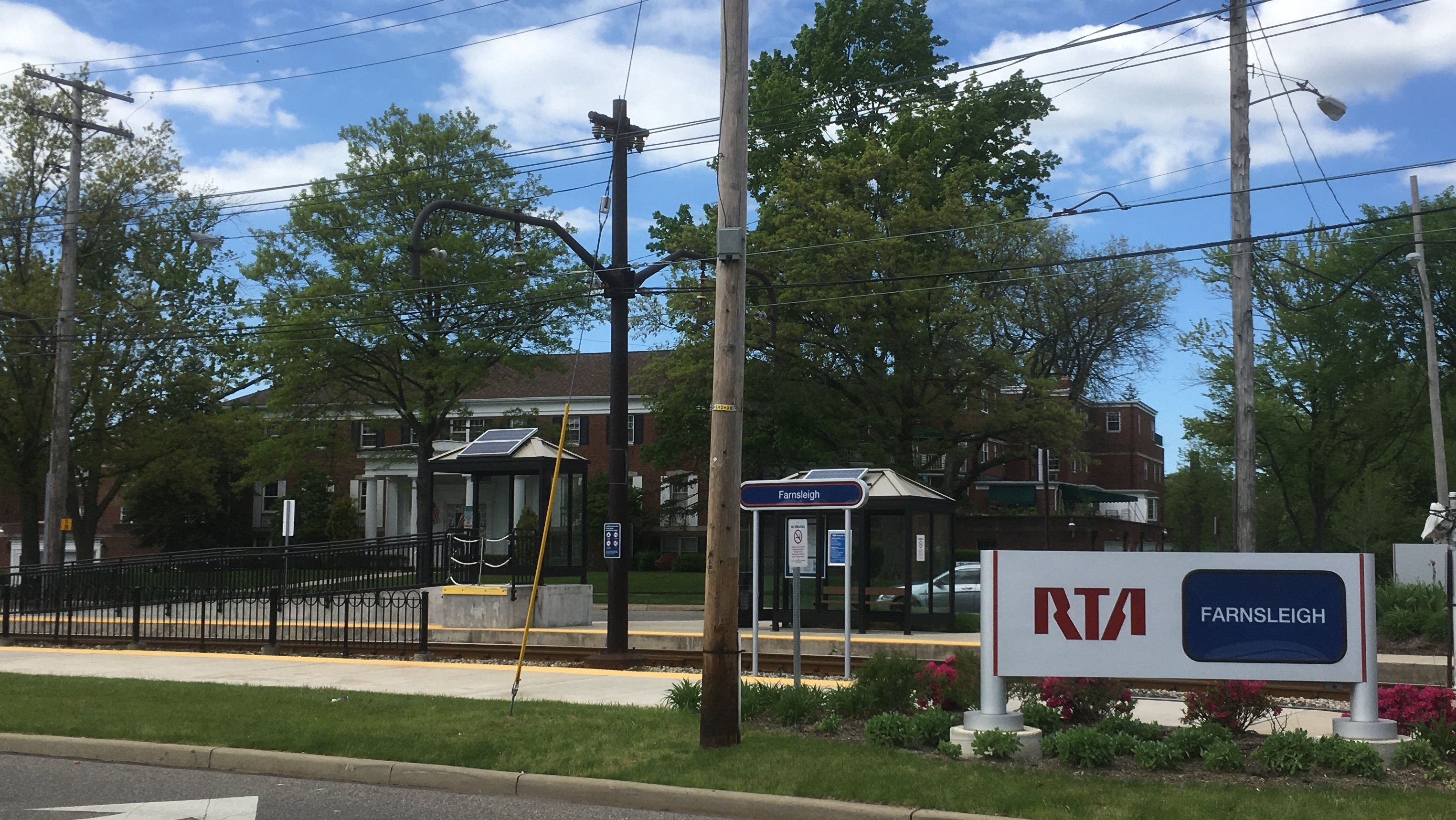
- Farnsleigh station in May 2020

General information
- Location: 20100 Van Aken Boulevard; Shaker Heights, Ohio
- Coordinates: 41°28′0″N 81°32′23″W
- Owner: City of Shaker Heights
- Operator: Greater Cleveland Regional Transit Authority
- Line: Van Aken Boulevard
- Platforms: 2 side platforms
- Tracks: 2

Construction
- Structure type: At-grade
- Parking: 140 spaces
- Cycle facilities: Racks
- Accessible: Yes

Other information
- Website: riderta.com/facilities/farnsleigh

History
- Opened: July 30, 1930; 96 years ago
- Rebuilt: 1981, 2019
- Original company: Cleveland Interurban Railroad

Services
| Preceding station | Rapid Transit | Following station |
|---|---|---|
| Lynnfield toward Tower City | Blue Line | Warrensville–Van Aken Terminus |
Location

Farnsleigh station is a station on the RTA Blue Line in Shaker Heights, Ohio, located in the median of Van Aken Boulevard at its intersection with Farnsleigh Road, after which the station is named.

== History ==
The station opened when the Van Aken line was extended east from Lynnfield Road. The extension used rail removed from Coventry Road between Shaker Boulevard and Fairmount Boulevard used to connect the Shaker line to the Cleveland streetcar system before 1920. The extension opened on July 30, 1930, at the same time that trains began using Cleveland Union Terminal.

In 1980 and 1981, the Green and Blue Lines were completely renovated with new track, ballast, poles and wiring, and new stations were built along the line. The renovated line along Van Aken Boulevard opened on October 30, 1981.

== Station layout ==
The station has two side platforms in the center median of Van Aken Boulevard, west of the intersection with Farnsleigh Road. The westbound platform has two shelters. There is parking along the median on both sides of Van Aken Boulevard adjacent to the station. There is also a large parking lot on the north side of Shaker Boulevard. The station has ramps to allow passengers with disabilities to access trains.

== Gallery ==
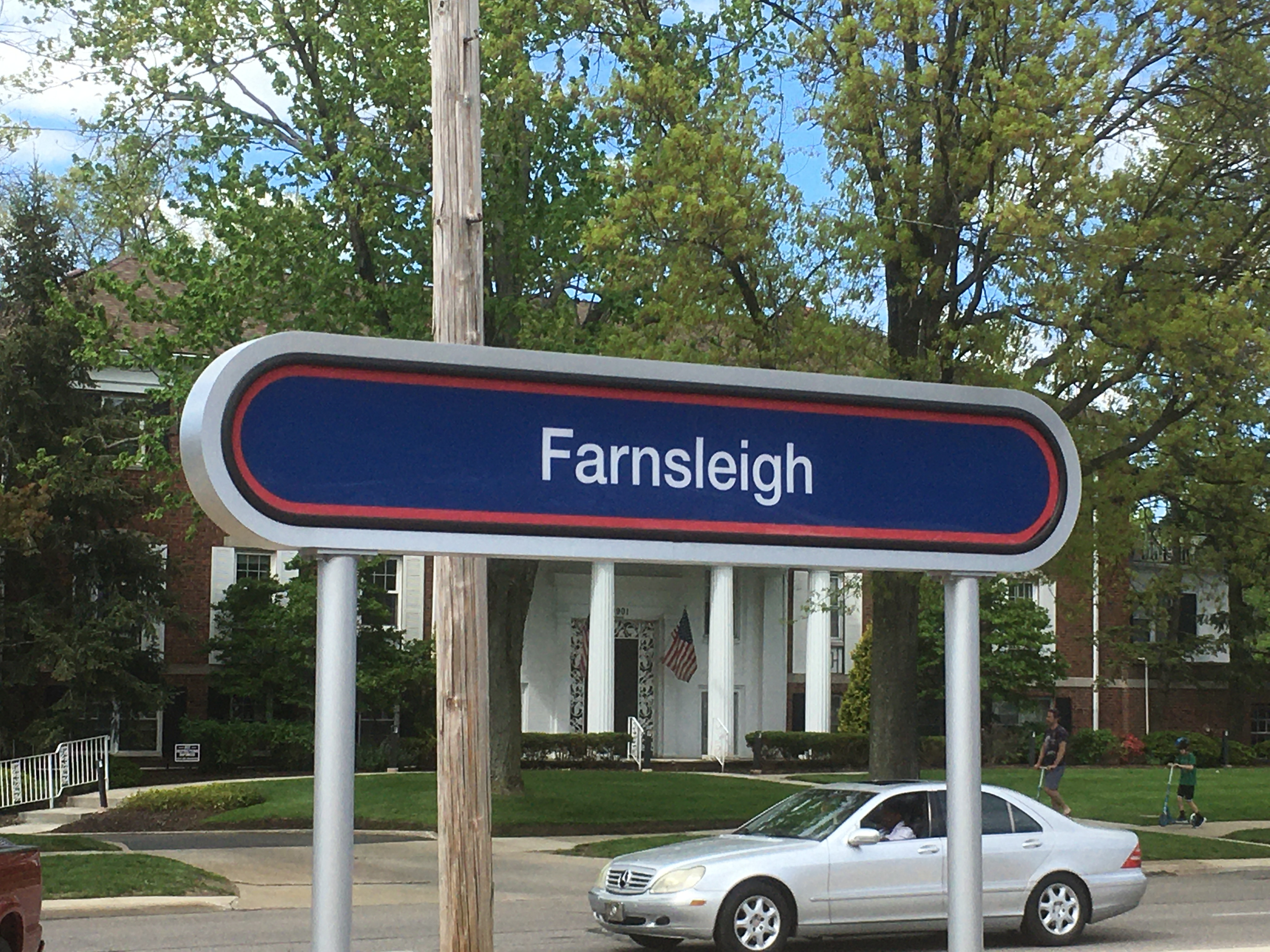
Platform signage

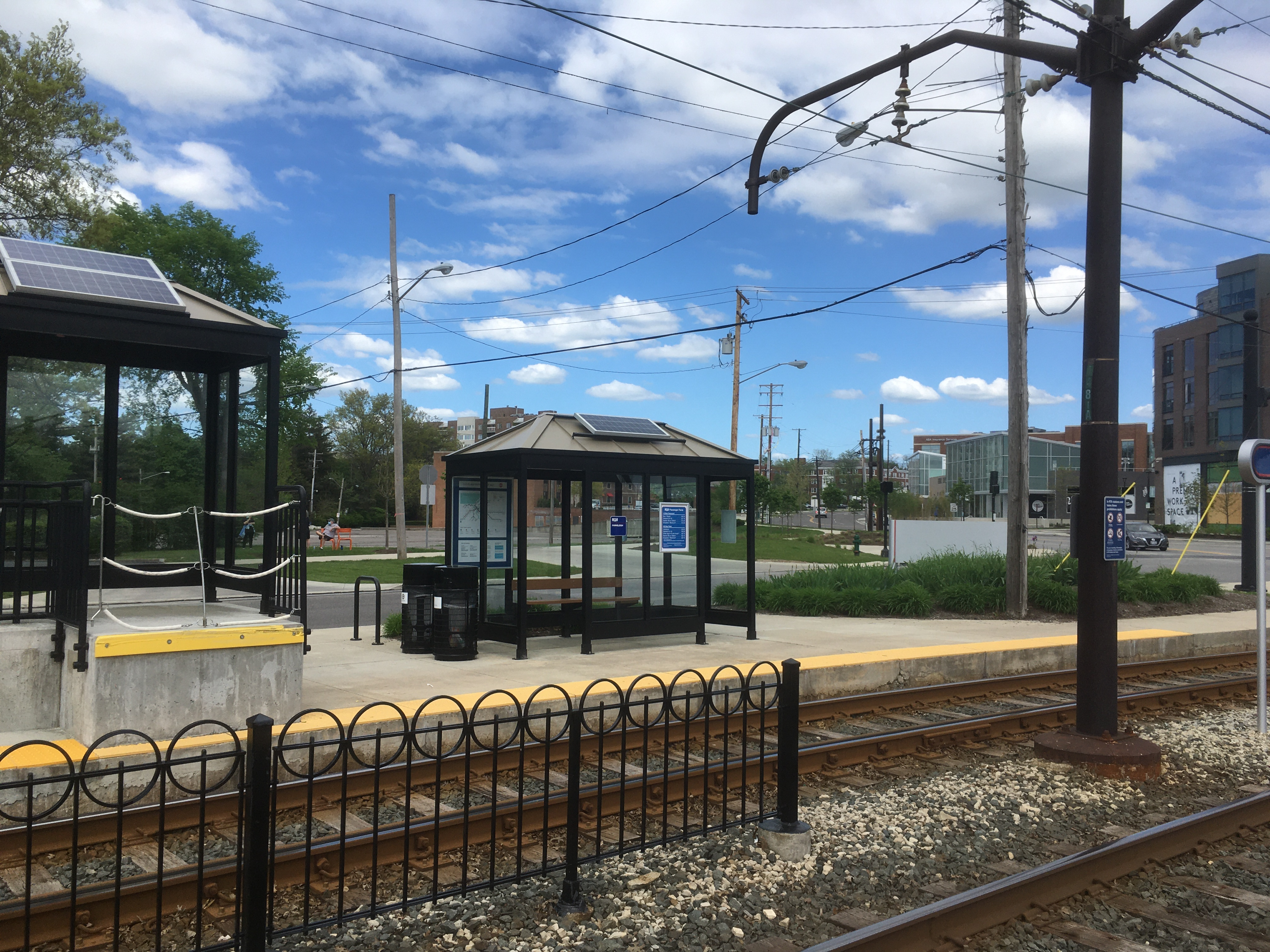
Shelter

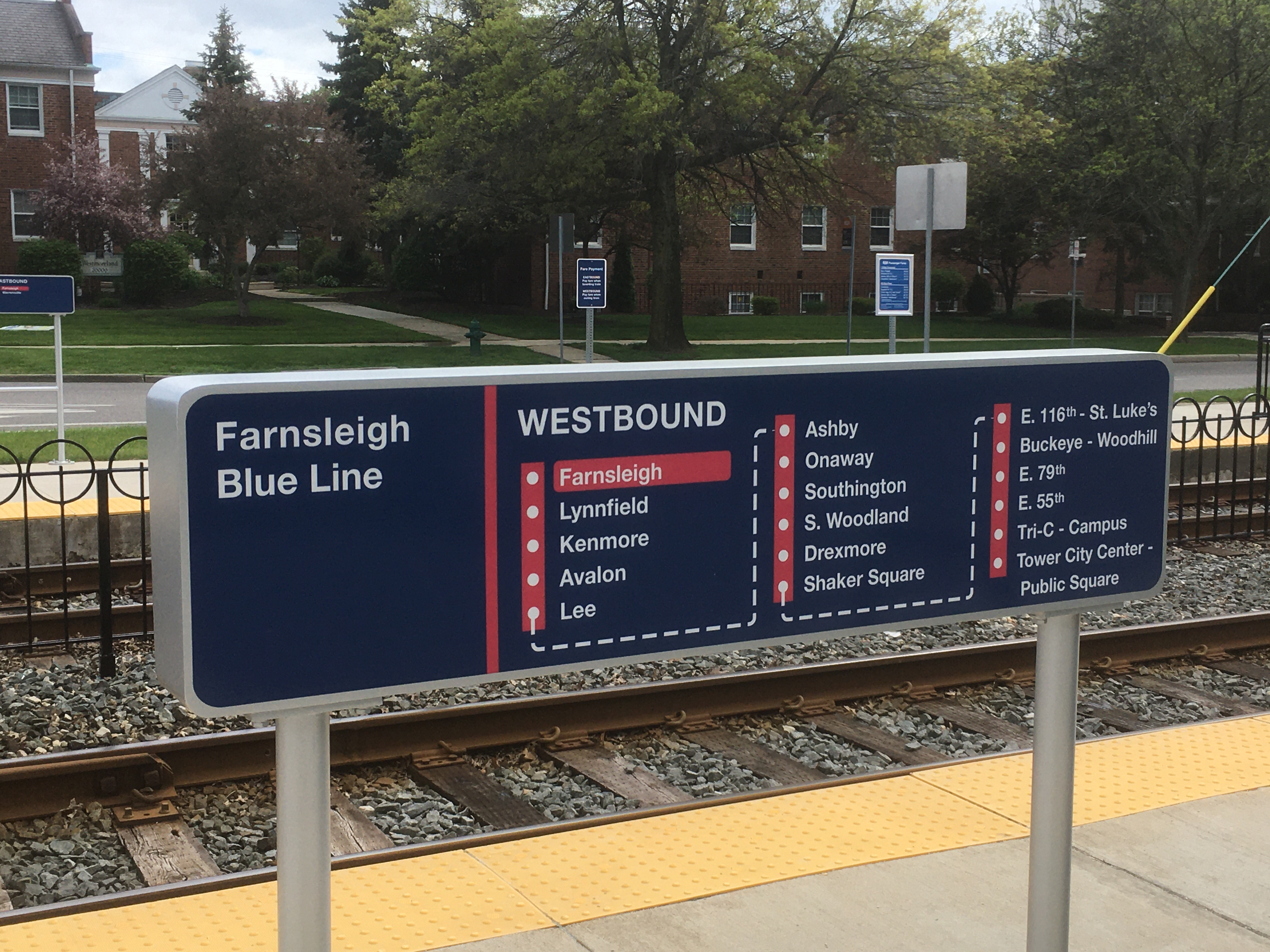
Westbound signage

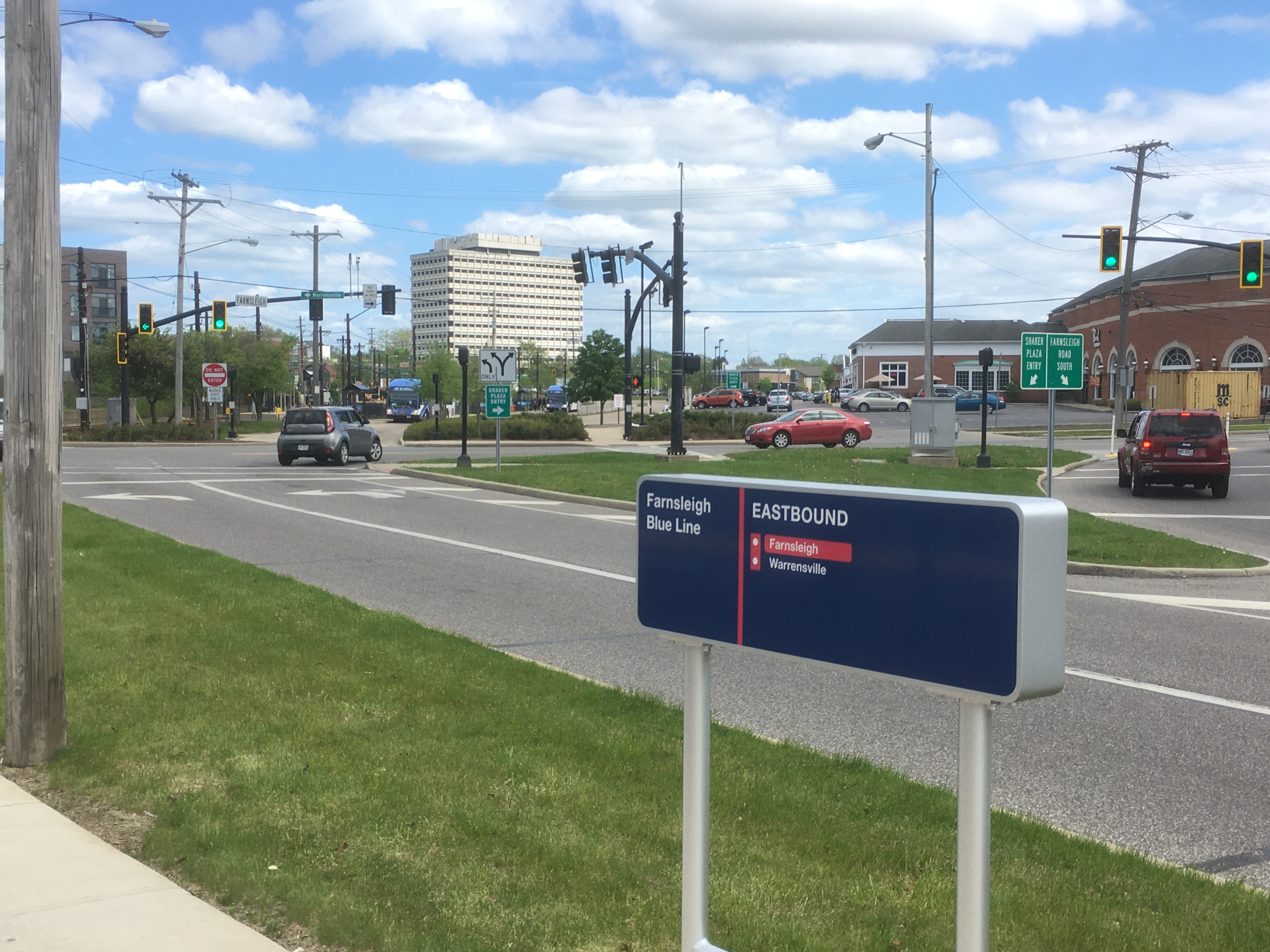
Eastbound signage
