= Buckeye–Woodhill =

Neighborhood of Cleveland, Ohio, United States

- Neighborhood of Cleveland
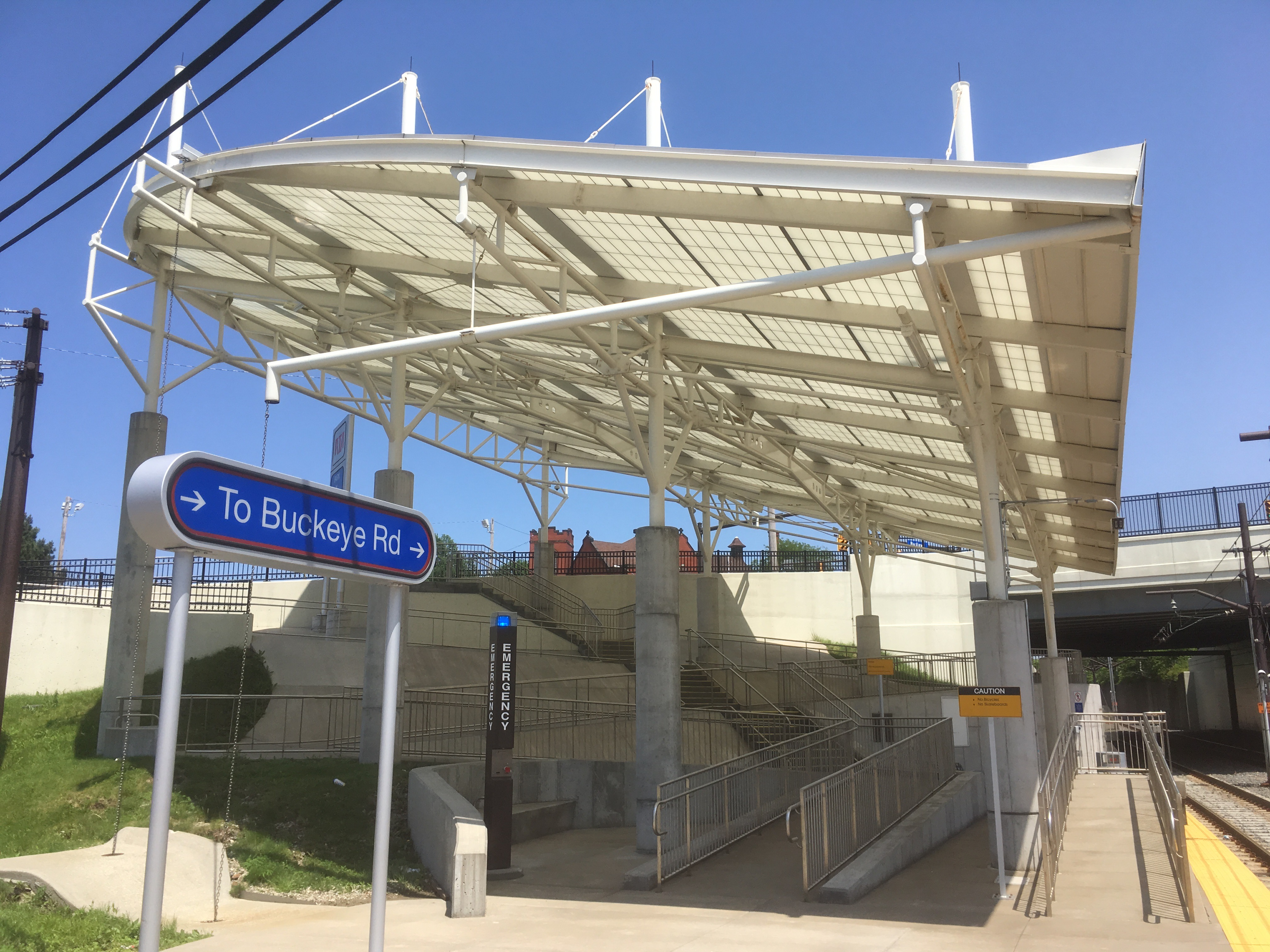
- Buckeye–Woodhill RTA station

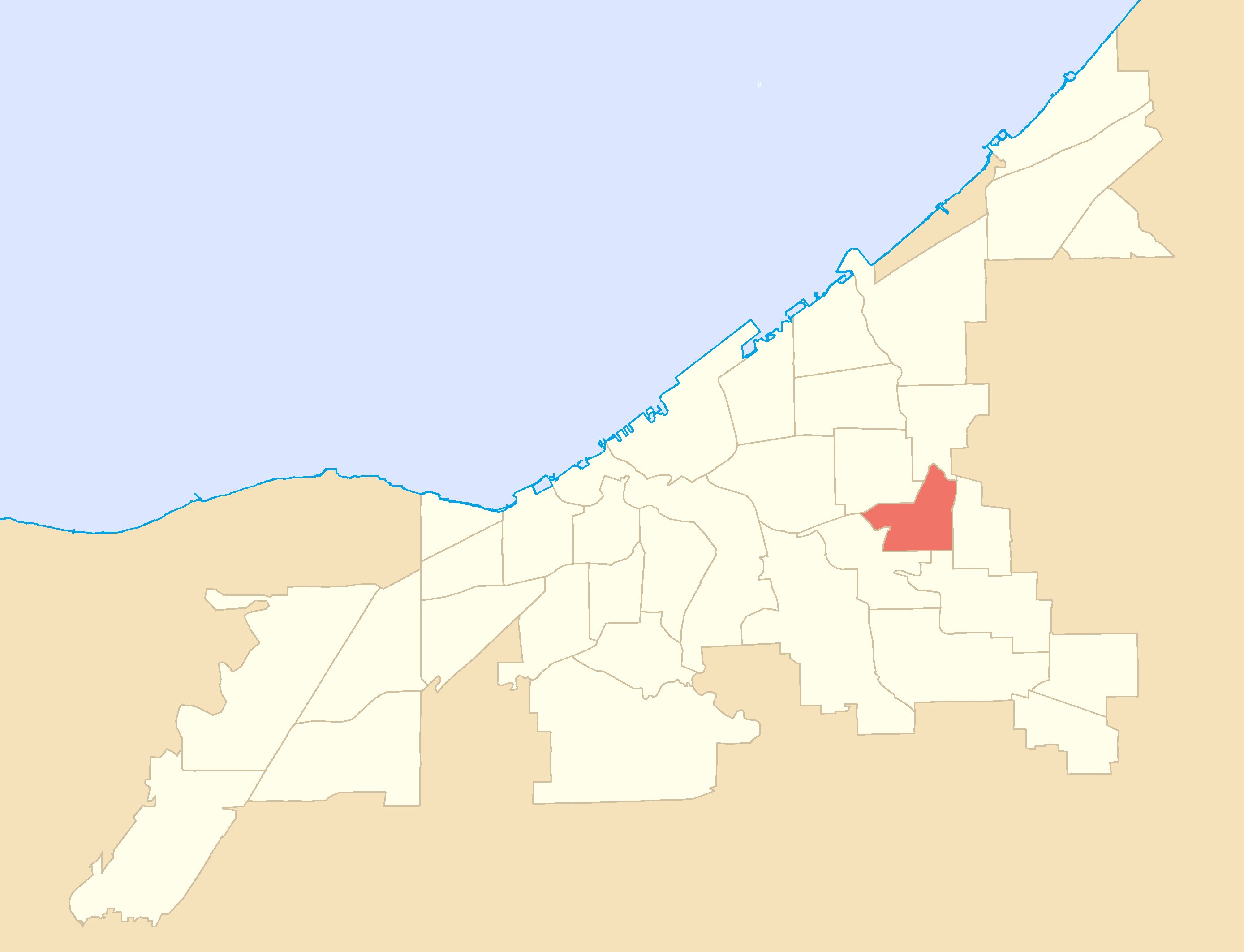
- Coordinates: 41°28′53″N 81°36′41″W
- Country: United States
- State: Ohio
- County: Cuyahoga County
- City: Cleveland

Population (2020)
  - Total: 5,984

Demographics
  - White: 5.3%
  - Black: 92.2%
  - Hispanic (of any race): 1.1%
  - Asian and Pacific Islander: 0.1%
  - Mixed and Other: 2.4%
- Time zone: UTC-5 (EST)
  - Summer (DST): UTC-4 (EDT)
- ZIP Codes: 44104
- Area code: 216
- Median income: $18,185
- Source: 2020 U.S. Census

Buckeye–Woodhill is a neighborhood on the East Side of Cleveland, Ohio. It borders the neighborhoods of University Circle and Fairfax to the north, Kinsman to the west, Buckeye–Shaker to the east, and Mount Pleasant to the south. Once a predominantly Hungarian neighborhood, its population is today largely African American. Formerly known as Woodland Hills, it is politically part of Cleveland's Ward 6.
