= Lynnfield station =

Rapid transit station in Cleveland

Lynnfield
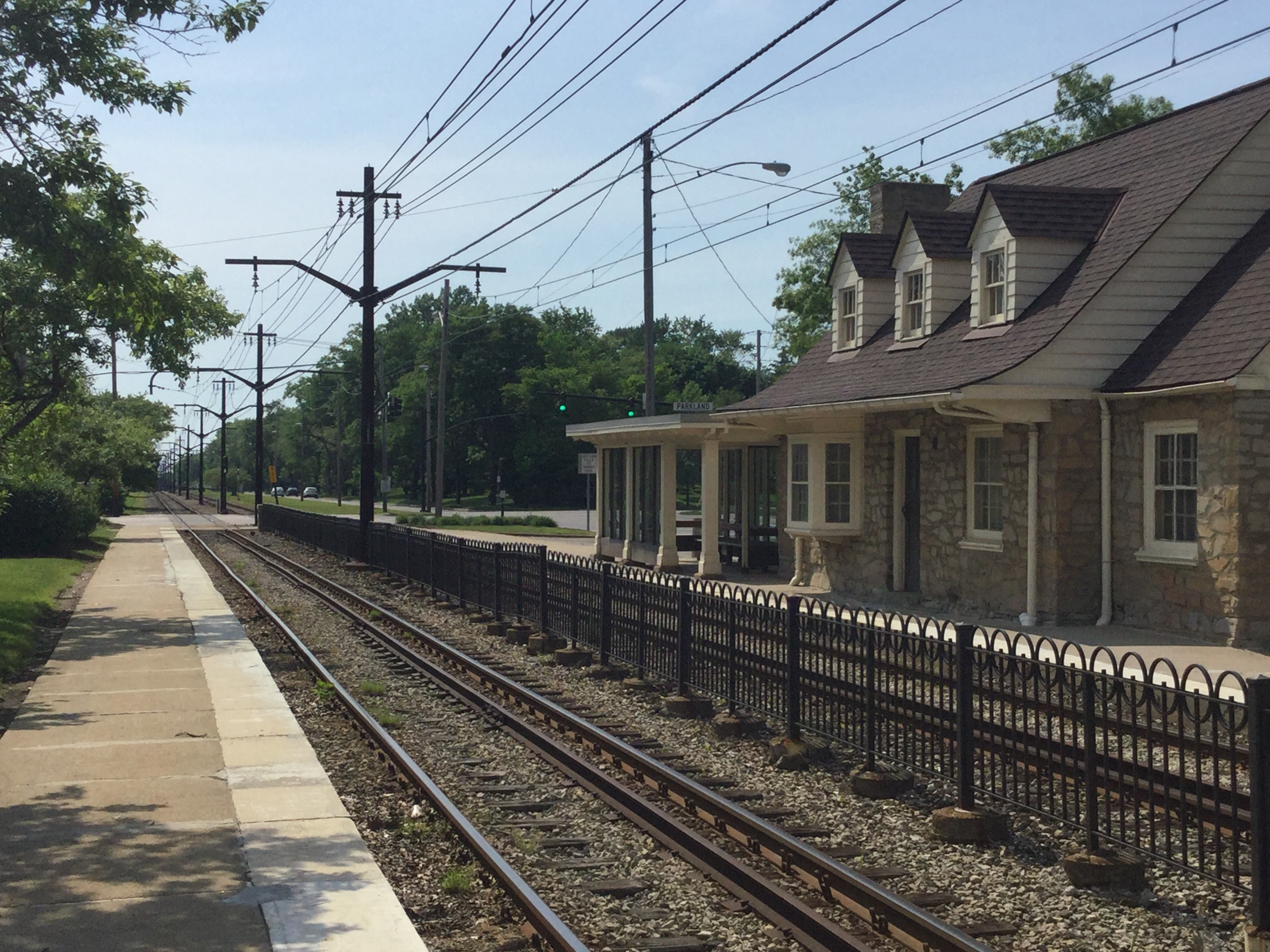
- Lynnfield station platforms with station building on the westbound platform in May 2018

General information
- Location: 18801 Van Aken Boulevard; Shaker Heights, Ohio
- Coordinates: 41°28′0″N 81°32′46″W
- Owner: City of Shaker Heights
- Operator: Greater Cleveland Regional Transit Authority
- Line: Van Aken Boulevard
- Platforms: 2 side platforms
- Tracks: 2

Construction
- Structure type: At-grade
- Parking: 157 spaces
- Accessible: No

Other information
- Website: riderta.com/facilities/lynnfield

History
- Opened: April 11, 1920; 106 years ago
- Rebuilt: 1981
- Original company: Cleveland Railway

Services
Preceding station	Rapid Transit	Following station
Kenmore toward Tower City	Blue Line	Farnsleigh toward Warrensville–Van Aken
Location

Lynnfield station is a stop on the RTA Blue Line in Shaker Heights, Ohio, located in the median of Van Aken Boulevard at its intersection with Lynnfield Road, after which the station is named, along with Parkland Drive and Norwood Road.

== History ==
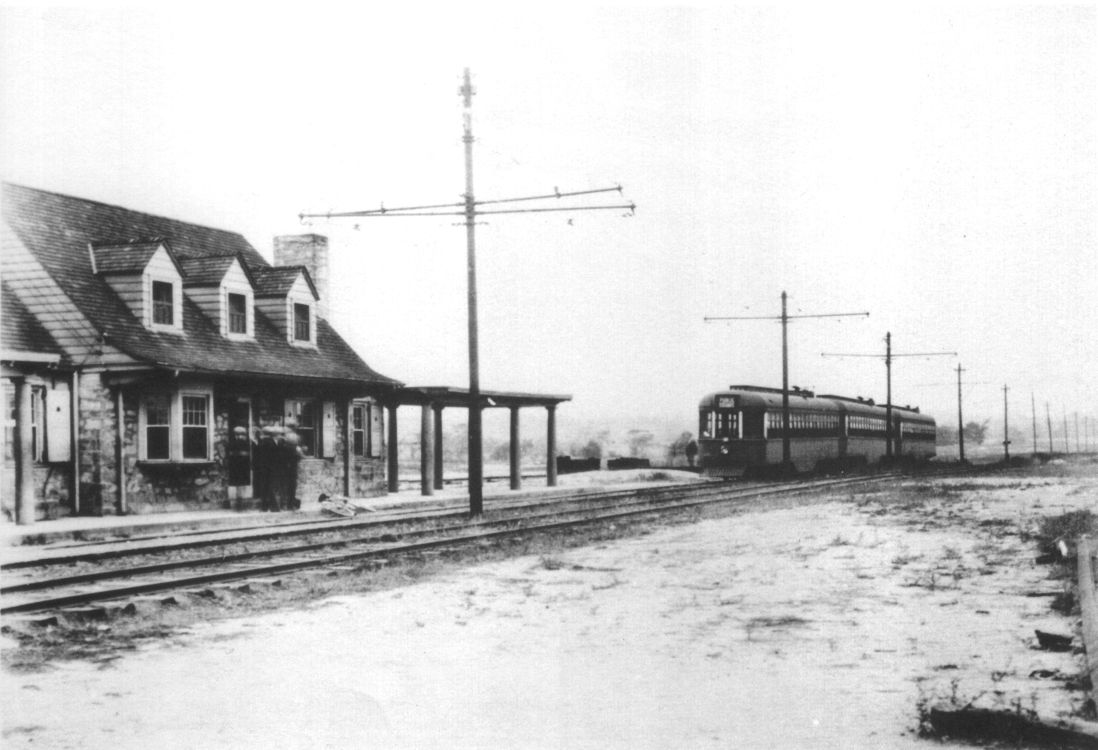
A train of three 1200-type cars laying over at the Lynnfield station terminus shortly after the station house was constructed in the early 1920s.

The station opened on April 11, 1920, with the initiation of rail service by the Cleveland Interurban Railroad on what is now Van Aken Boulevard from here to Shaker Square and then to East 34th Street and via surface streets to downtown. At the time, Lynnfield was the end of the line. In 1923 the station building was built at a cost of $17,926 to provide a waiting room for passengers. It also housed tobacco and newspaper stands. The newspapers were delivered to the station by rapid transit. The building included outside shelters on both sides.

After the line was extended to Warrensville Center Road in 1930, Lynnfield no longer functioned as the end of the line and the station building was not needed. The building was leased to a series of tenants.

In 1980 and 1981, the Green and Blue Lines were completely renovated with new track, ballast, poles and wiring, and new stations were built along the line. The renovated line along Van Aken Boulevard opened on October 30, 1981.

The improvements at Lynnfield included renovating the original station building, providing benches in the waiting shelter, and enclosing the waiting shelter in glass.

== Station layout ==
The station comprises two side platforms in the center median of Van Aken Boulevard east of the intersection with Lynnfield Road. There is a large station building an attached sheltered waiting area on the westbound platform. There are parking spaces along the median of Van Aken Boulevard on both sides just east of the platforms. The station does not have ramps to allow passengers with disabilities to access trains.
