= Shaker Square station =

Rapid transit station in Cleveland

Shaker Square
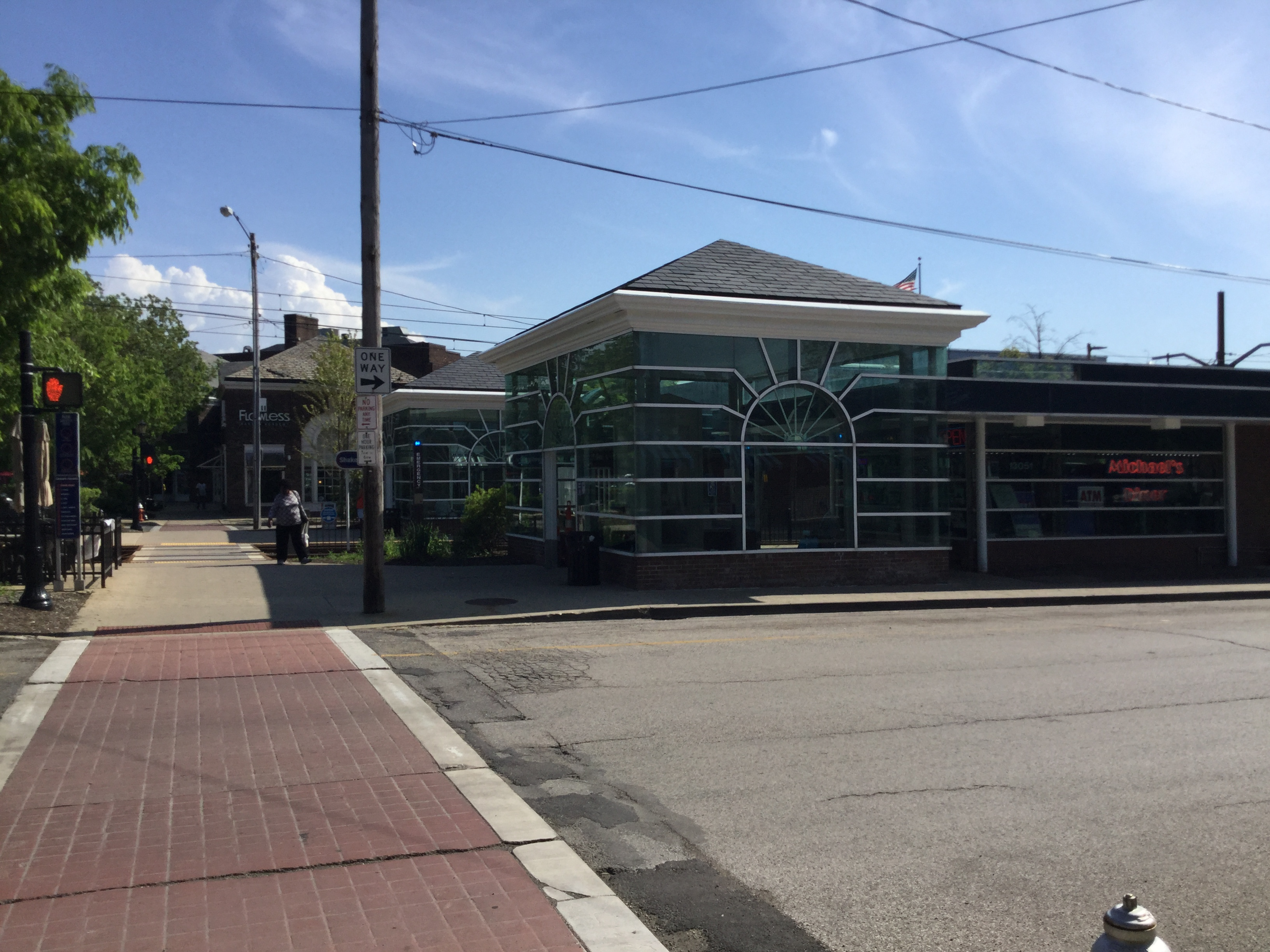
- Shaker Square station, with the 1984-built glass shelters

General information
- Location: 13051 Shaker Boulevard; Cleveland, Ohio
- Coordinates: 41°29′2″N 81°35′30″W
- Owner: Greater Cleveland Regional Transit Authority
- Line: Shaker Boulevard
- Platforms: 2 side platforms
- Tracks: 2
- Connections: RTA: 8, 48

Construction
- Structure type: At-grade
- Cycle facilities: Racks
- Accessible: Yes

Other information
- Website: riderta.com/facilities/shakersquare

History
- Opened: April 11, 1920; 106 years ago
- Rebuilt: 1952, 1986, 2006, 2020
- Former names: Moreland Circle
- Original company: Cleveland Railway

Services
Preceding station	Rapid Transit	Following station
East 116th–St. Luke's toward Tower City	Blue Line	Drexmore toward Warrensville–Van Aken
East 116th–St. Luke's toward Tower City	Green Line	Coventry toward Green Road
Location

Shaker Square station is a station on the RTA Blue and Green Lines in Cleveland, Ohio, located in the median of Shaker Boulevard (Ohio State Route 87) at its intersection with Shaker Square, after which the station is named. It is the first station west of the junction of the Blue and Green Lines and serves as a transfer point between the two lines.

It marks the dividing point between the line's grade-separated portion and its at-grade portion, with trains running on a grade-separated right-of-way west of this station to Tower City and running at-grade in the medians of Van Aken Boulevard (Blue) and Shaker Boulevard (Green) east of this station.

== History ==
On April 11, 1920, the predecessor of what is now the Blue Line began operation through Moreland Circle, then an empty traffic circle.

The junction between the Shaker Boulevard line and the line along Van Aken (then named South Moreland) Boulevard was in the middle of Moreland Circle; thus, the station stop was located on the western end of the circle.

Development of Moreland Circle into Shaker Square began in 1927, when construction started on the planned suburban shopping center. The circle was transformed into more of a square (actually an octagon), and the rail junction was moved about one-quarter mile to the east. Conductors on the train were instructed to begin call the stop “Shaker Square” as of August 29, 1928. The Shaker Square development was completed in 1929, but no provision was made for an extensive station facility at the location. The station consisted of small wooden shelters on the western side of the square.

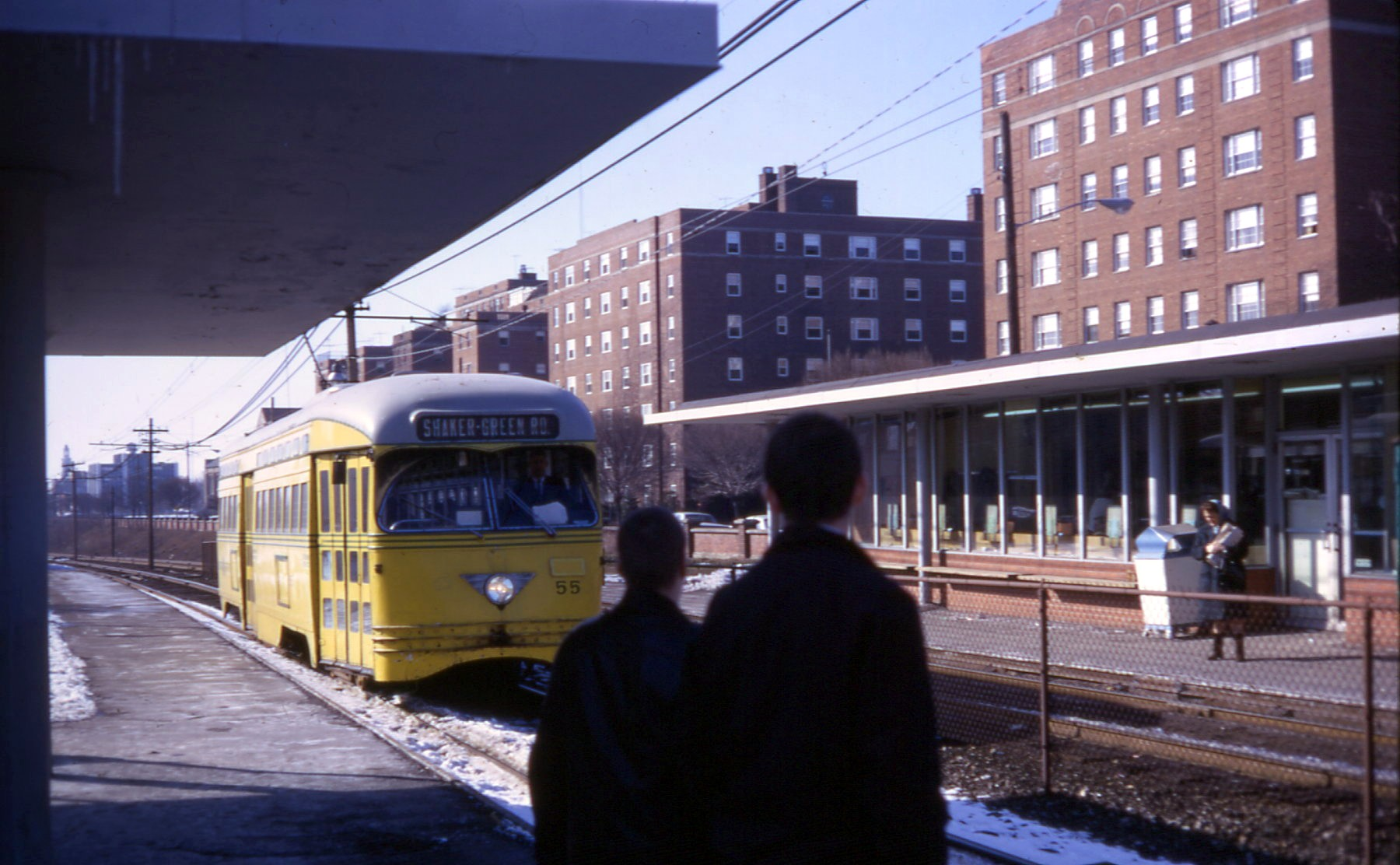
Eastbound Green Line car approaching Shaker Square station in February 1968

In 1949, Shaker Heights Rapid Transit officials proposed replacing the shelters with a combination three-story passenger station and retail complex to straddle the tracks at the western end of Shaker Square. However, Shaker Square merchants opposed the plan and proposed an alternative smaller station, which was eventually built and opened in October 1952. The wooden shelters were replaced by a coffee shop with an adjoining sheltered passenger platform along the westbound side, and a concrete and steel waiting area along the eastbound side.

This station lasted until 1984, when a new station was proposed. The result was two brick and glass pavilions designed in a Georgian style to match the existing architecture of the Shaker Square buildings that surround them. The old coffee shop was retained, but a new exterior was built around it. Designed by Cleveland architect William Gould, the new station opened in July 1986. It won design awards from both Cleveland and Ohio architectural societies.

A proposal to rent the coffee shop space for a McDonald's restaurant in 1996 met stiff opposition and was eventually abandoned.

Further changes were made to the 1986 design as a result of the overall upgrade of the Shaker Square right-of-way in 2006. The station buildings were enlarged, and wheelchair lifts were provided to allow passengers with mobility disabilities to access cars. The refurbished station reopened on September 20, 2006.

The wheelchair lifts were replaced with ramps to mini-high platforms in 2020 because the lifts proved costly to maintain, broke down frequently, and were hard to keep clean. The lifts also did not accommodate oversized wheelchairs.

== Station layout ==
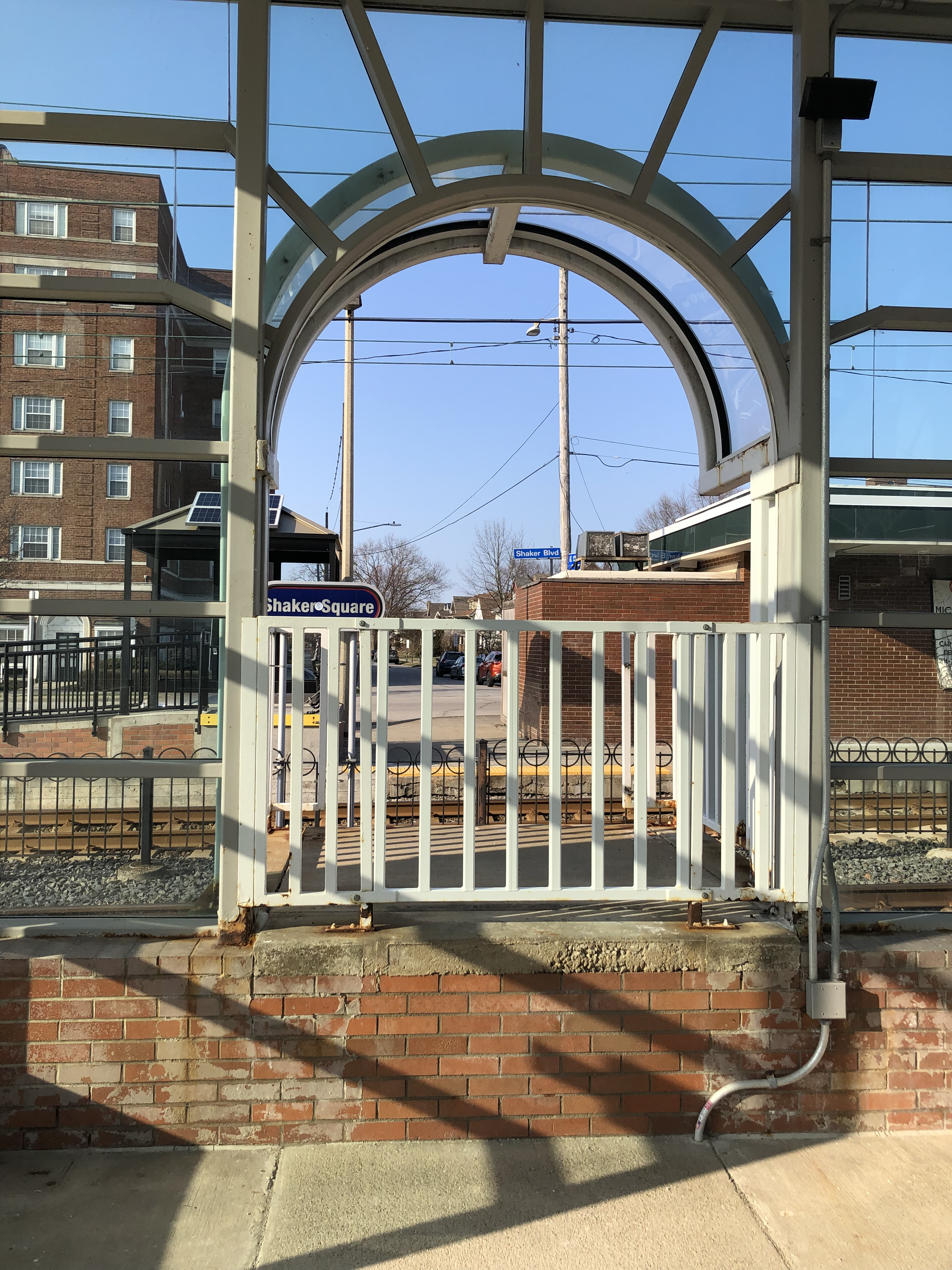
Former wheelchair lift platform at Shaker Square station

The station has two side platforms, both located west of the Shaker Square loop. The westbound platform shares space with a restaurant. Each platform has large shelters along with mini-high platforms, which allow passengers with disabilities to access trains.

There is no parking directly at the Shaker Square station, though there is parking in the area, and parking is also available at Drexmore station on the Blue Line at the eastern edge of the Shaker Square development area.

== Notable places nearby ==
- Shaker Square — Historic shopping center featuring restaurants and retail outlets
- Halle Brothers Shaker Square department store
