= Warrensville–Van Aken station =

Rapid transit station in Cleveland

Warrensville
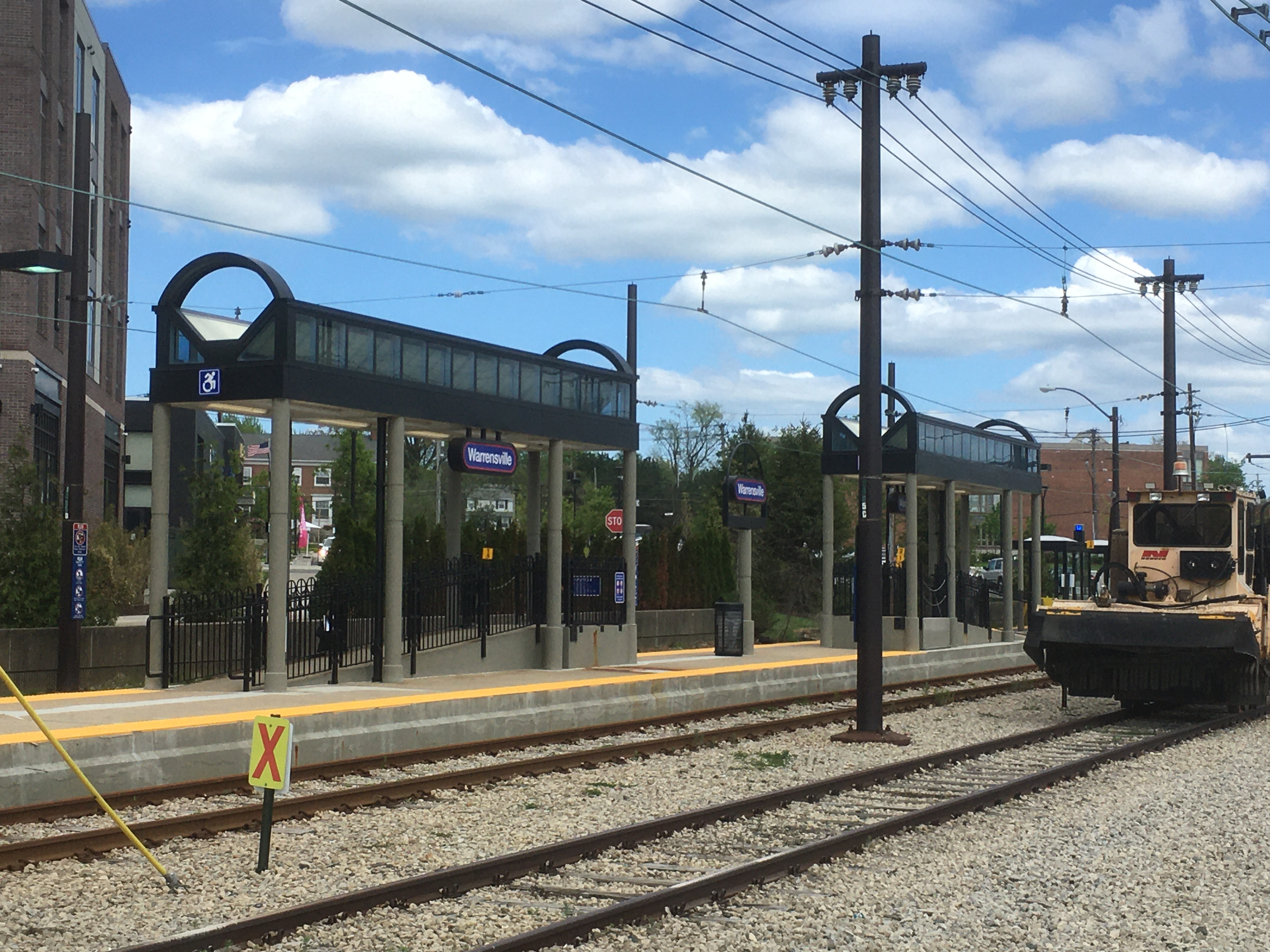
- Warrensville–Van Aken station platform

General information
- Location: 3470 Warrensville Center Road; Shaker Heights, Ohio
- Coordinates: 41°27′57″N 81°32′16″W
- Owner: City of Shaker Heights
- Operator: Greater Cleveland Regional Transit Authority
- Line: Van Aken Boulevard
- Platforms: 1 island platform
- Tracks: 3
- Connections: RTA: 14, 14A, 41, 41F

Construction
- Structure type: At-grade
- Cycle facilities: Racks
- Accessible: Yes

Other information
- Website: riderta.com/facilities/warrensvillevanaken

History
- Opened: July 30, 1930; 96 years ago
- Rebuilt: 1981, 1999
- Original company: Cleveland Interurban Railroad

Services
Preceding station	Rapid Transit	Following station
Farnsleigh toward Tower City	Blue Line	Terminus
Track layout
1930
1948
Location

Warrensville–Van Aken station (signed as Warrensville) is a station on the RTA light rail Blue Line in Shaker Heights, Ohio. It is the eastern terminus of the Blue Line. Unlike most of the stations in Shaker Heights, Warrensville–Van Aken is located off street, not in the median of Van Aken Boulevard. It is located in a block surrounded by Chagrin Boulevard (U.S. Route 422), Van Aken Boulevard, and Northfield Road (Ohio State Route 8) and Tuttle Road in the midst of a dense retail/commercial area. The station is located one block west of Warrensville Center Road, after which it named.

== History ==
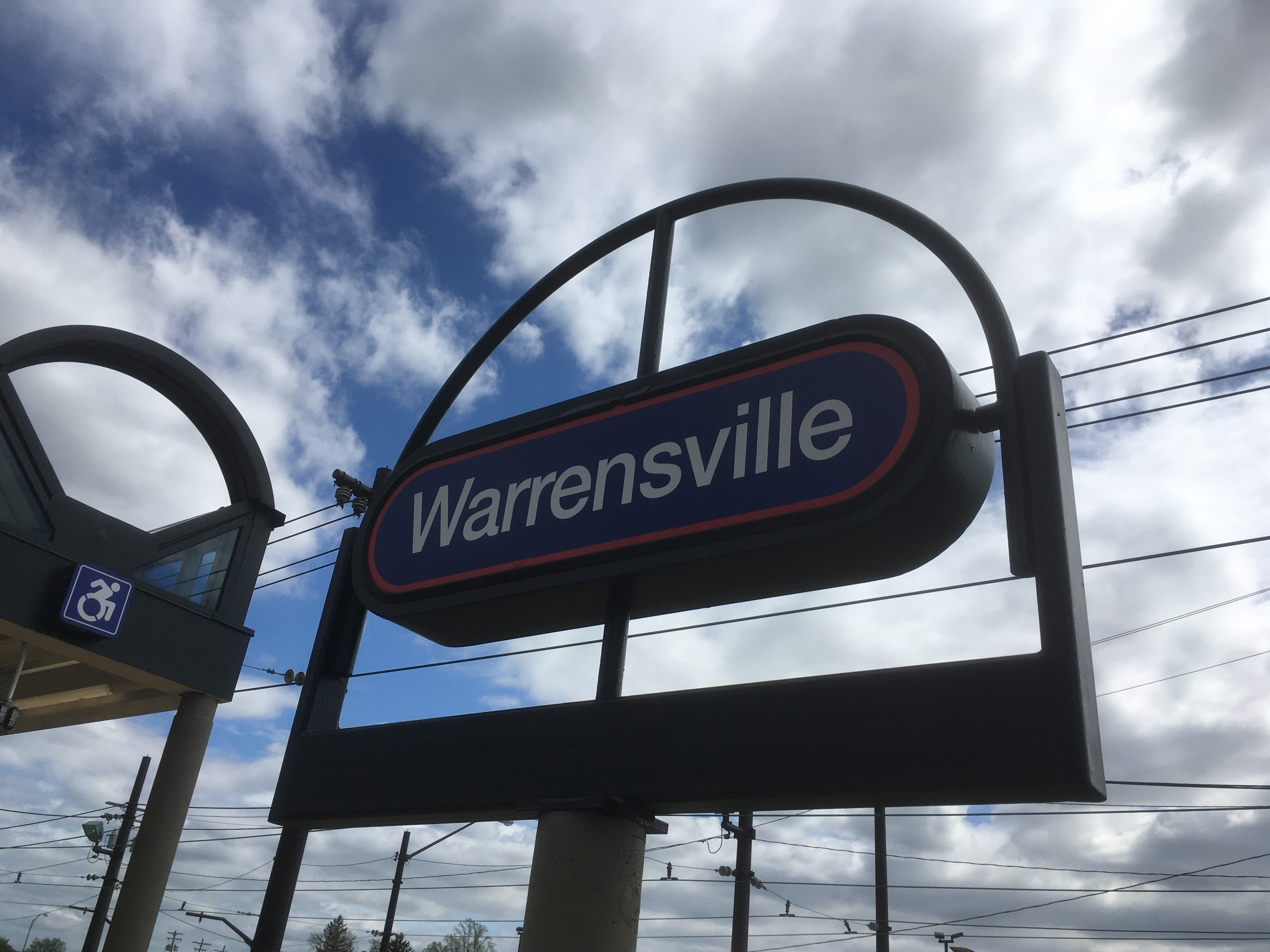
Station sign

The station opened when the Van Aken line was extended east from Lynnfield Road. The extension opened on July 30, 1930 at the same time that trains began using Cleveland Union Terminal. The station originally included a car yard with a reverse U loop for turning cars around. A passenger station building was constructed within the loop in 1932. However, because of the need to generate income, the building was never used as a passenger station but was leased for use as a Texaco service station. In 1948, the reverse U loop was replaced by a regular turnaround loop.

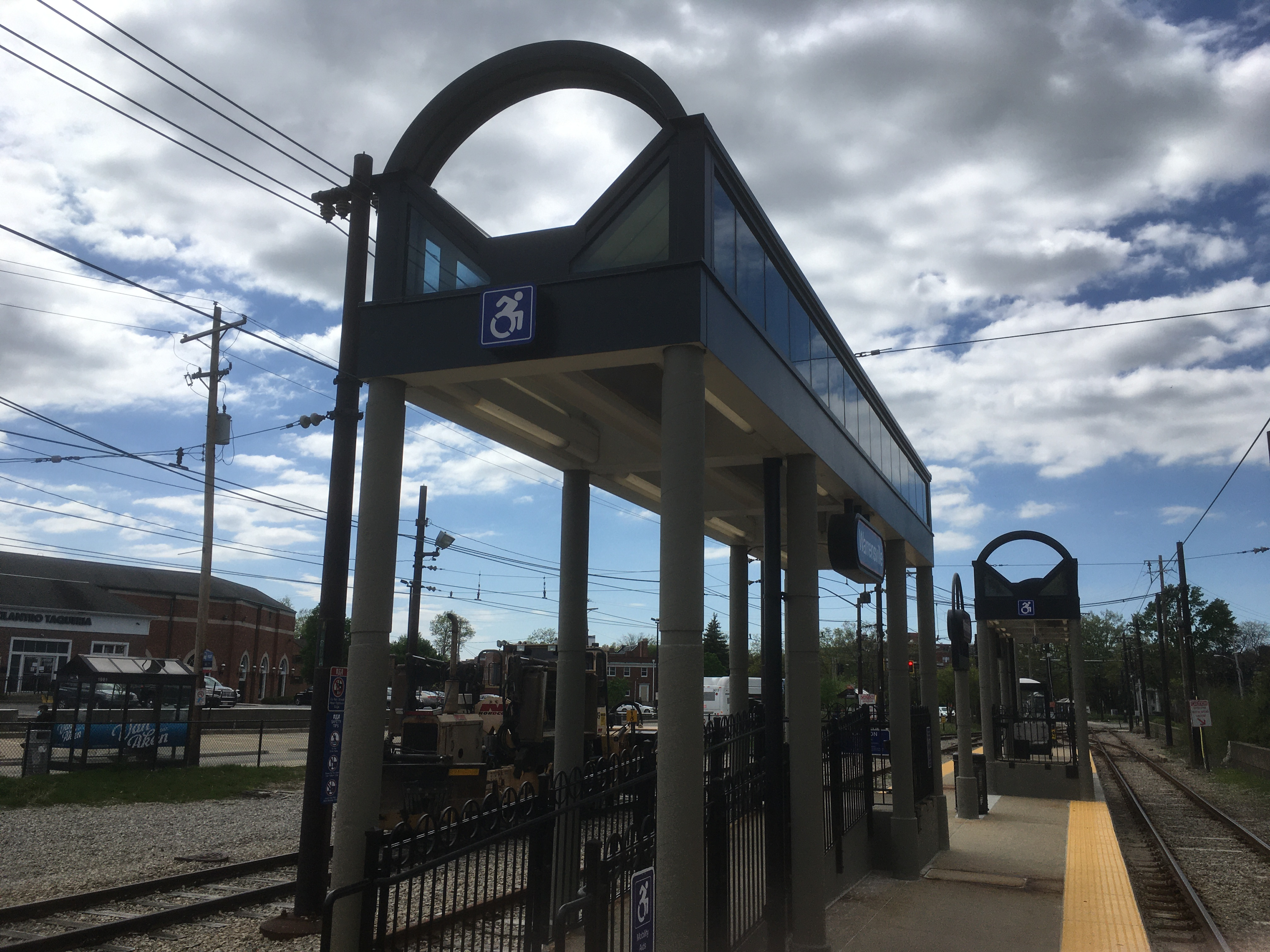
Wheelchair ramp

In 1980 and 1981, the Green and Blue Lines were completely renovated with new track, ballast, poles and wiring, and new stations were built along the line. The Warrensville station was rebuilt with a new platforms, a new car yard and a new power substation. The renovated line along Van Aken Boulevard opened on October 30, 1981.

The car yard was not needed after RTA opened its Central Rail Maintenance Facility on April 29, 1984 at East 55th Street. The loop was closed after RTA ended its use of PCC cars and relied completely upon the LRVs that comprise the current fleet.

There have been several proposals to extend the Blue Line beyond Warrensville station. The proposal most recently considered would be a two-mile (3.2 km) extension into and around the 600-acre (240 ha) Chagrin Highlands development near Harvard Road and I-271. The proposed route would travel along Northfield Road south, and then turns east along Mill Creek Pond Dr., traveling parallel to Harvard Road. The line would terminate somewhere between Richmond and Green Roads.

== Station layout ==
The station has a single island platform with a few small shelters along with a pair of ramps to allow passengers with disabilities to access trains.

== Notable places nearby ==
- The Van Aken District (retail, restaurant, offices)
- Tower East
- Canterbury Golf Club
