= Cleveland Railway (Ohio) =

Railway company in Cleveland, Ohio

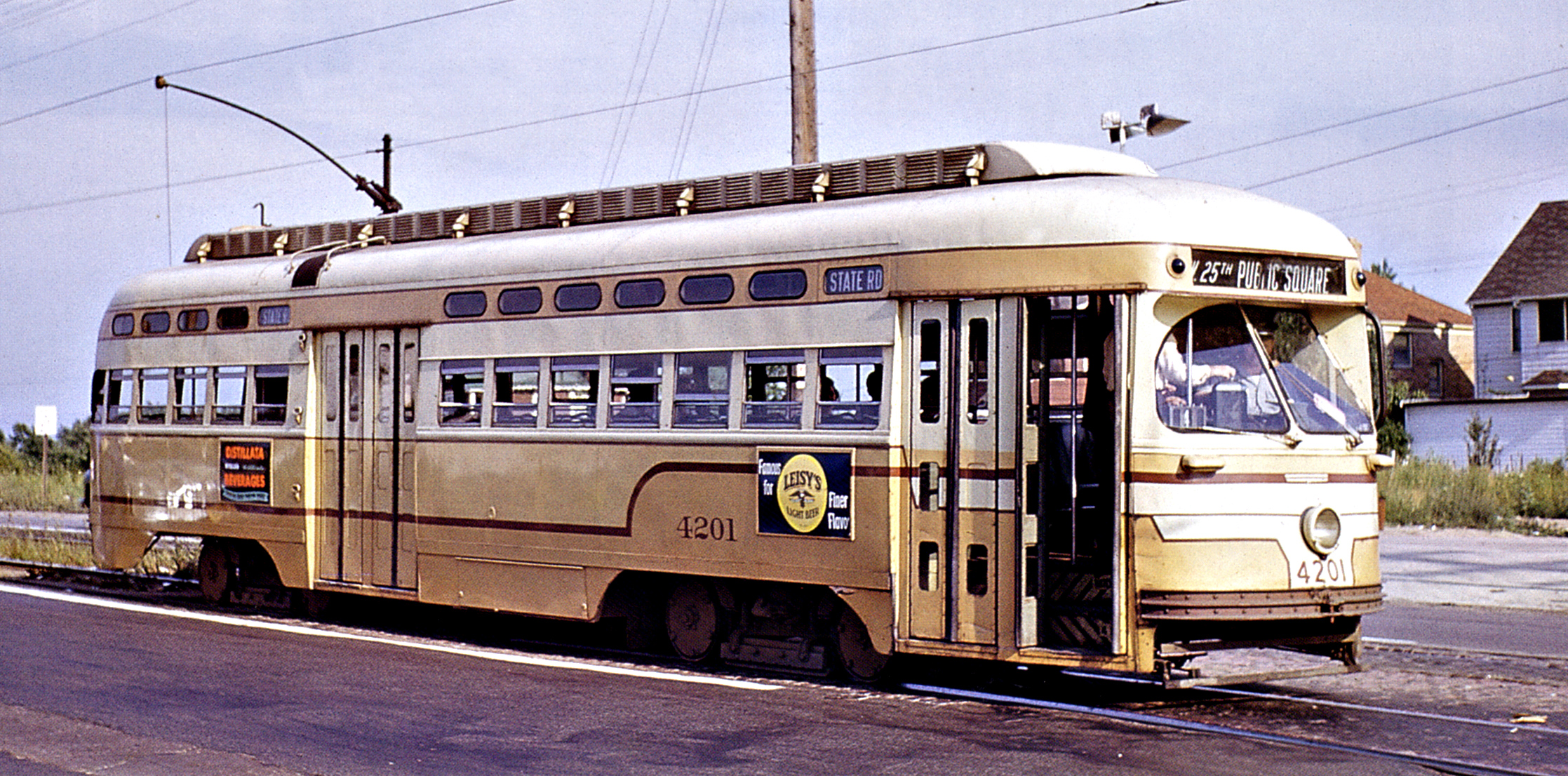
PCC streetcar 4201 in Cleveland, Ohio, in the 1950s - later sold to Toronto Transportation Commission and re-classed as TTC A11 car 4626

The Cleveland Railway Company was the public transit operator in Cleveland, Ohio, from 1910 to 1942. The company began operations with assets of the former Forest City Railway, which operated from 1906 to 1909. The company owned a fleet of PCC streetcars.

Though National City Lines never owned the system in Cleveland, General Motors negotiated the sale of buses to the city, resulting in the shutdown of the streetcar system. In Cleveland, complaints were made to the FBI after the mayor and city councilors were seen driving around in new General Motors cars. Mayor Ray T. Miller received a new car within a month that General Motors won the contract for new buses The FBI refused to investigate based on high-profile nature of the people targeted.

The city of Cleveland bought out Cleveland Railway in 1942 and used it as the nucleus for the Cleveland Transit System, the precursor to the current Greater Cleveland Regional Transit Authority.

The Cleveland streetcars were sold to the Toronto Transit Commission, where they remained in service for thirty years until 1982. Others were sold to the Berlin and Waterloo Street Railway Company.

== Fleet ==
- Peter Witt streetcar - 130 ordered in 1915 and 1916
- Peter Witt streetcar - ordered 1918 and 5 cars sold to London Street Railway in 1923 and re-sold to various operators in 1941
- Presidents' Conference Committee cars - 75 all-electric cars sold in 1952 to Toronto Transportation Commission: 50 Pullman Standard A11 and 25 St. Louis Car Company A12 (originally ordered by Louisville Railway)

== Corporate mergers ==
Mergers leading up to the establishment of Cleveland Railway

- Cleveland Railway (March 1, 1910)
  - Cleveland Electric Railway (March 25, 1893)
    - East Cleveland Railway (September 20, 1859)
    - Broadway and Newburgh Street Railway (1872)
    - South Side Street Railroad (1874)
  - Cleveland City Railway (May 1893)
    - Woodland Avenue and West Side Street Railroad (1885)
      - Woodland Avenue Railroad (Kinsman Street Railroad) (1859)
      - West Side Railway (1863)
    - Superior Street Railway (1867)
    - St. Clair Street Railroad (1863)
  - Municipal Traction (1906)
    - Forest City Railway (1903)
    - Low Fare Traction (1906)

== See also ==
- Streetcars in Cleveland
- National City Lines - A company owned by gas and car companies (including General Motors that targeted streetcar systems for shutdown.
- Great American streetcar conspiracy
- Northern Ohio Railway Museum
