= Flats East Bank station =

Rapid transit station in Cleveland

Flats East Bank
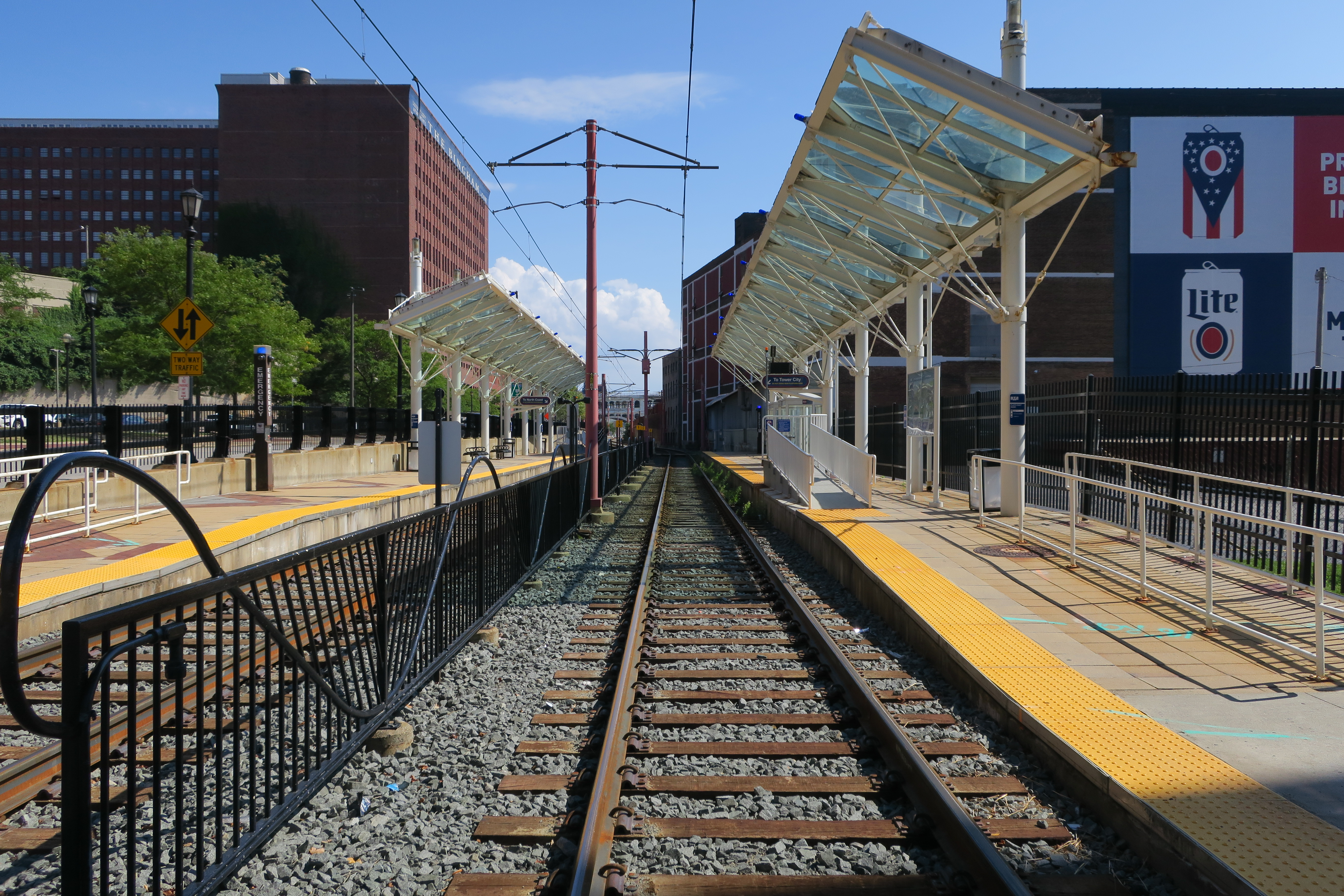
- Flats East Bank station platforms

General information
- Location: 1198 West 10th Street; Cleveland, Ohio
- Coordinates: 41°29′58″N 81°42′13″W
- Owner: Flats East Development LLC
- Operator: Greater Cleveland Regional Transit Authority
- Platforms: 2 side platforms
- Tracks: 2

Construction
- Structure type: At-grade
- Cycle facilities: Racks
- Accessible: Yes

Other information
- Website: riderta.com/facilities/flatseastbank

History
- Opened: July 10, 1996; 30 years ago

Services
Preceding station	Rapid Transit	Following station
West 3rd toward South Harbor	Waterfront Line	Settlers Landing toward Tower City
Location

Flats East Bank station is a station on the RTA Waterfront Line in Cleveland, Ohio. The station is located along West 10th Street just southeast of its intersection with Main Avenue in The Flats district.

== History ==
The station opened on July 10, 1996, when light rail service was extended 2.2 miles (3.5 km) from Tower City through The Flats and along the lakefront. This extension was designated the Waterfront Line, although it is actually an extension of the Blue and Green Lines, as trains leaving this station toward Tower City continue along the Blue or Green Line routes to Shaker Heights.

== Station layout ==
The station has two side platforms, each with a glass shelter and a mini-high platform which allow passengers with disabilities to access trains.

== Notable places nearby ==
- Oswald Tower
- The Flats
- The Pinnacle
- Warehouse District
