= Settlers Landing station =

Rapid transit station in Cleveland

Settlers Landing
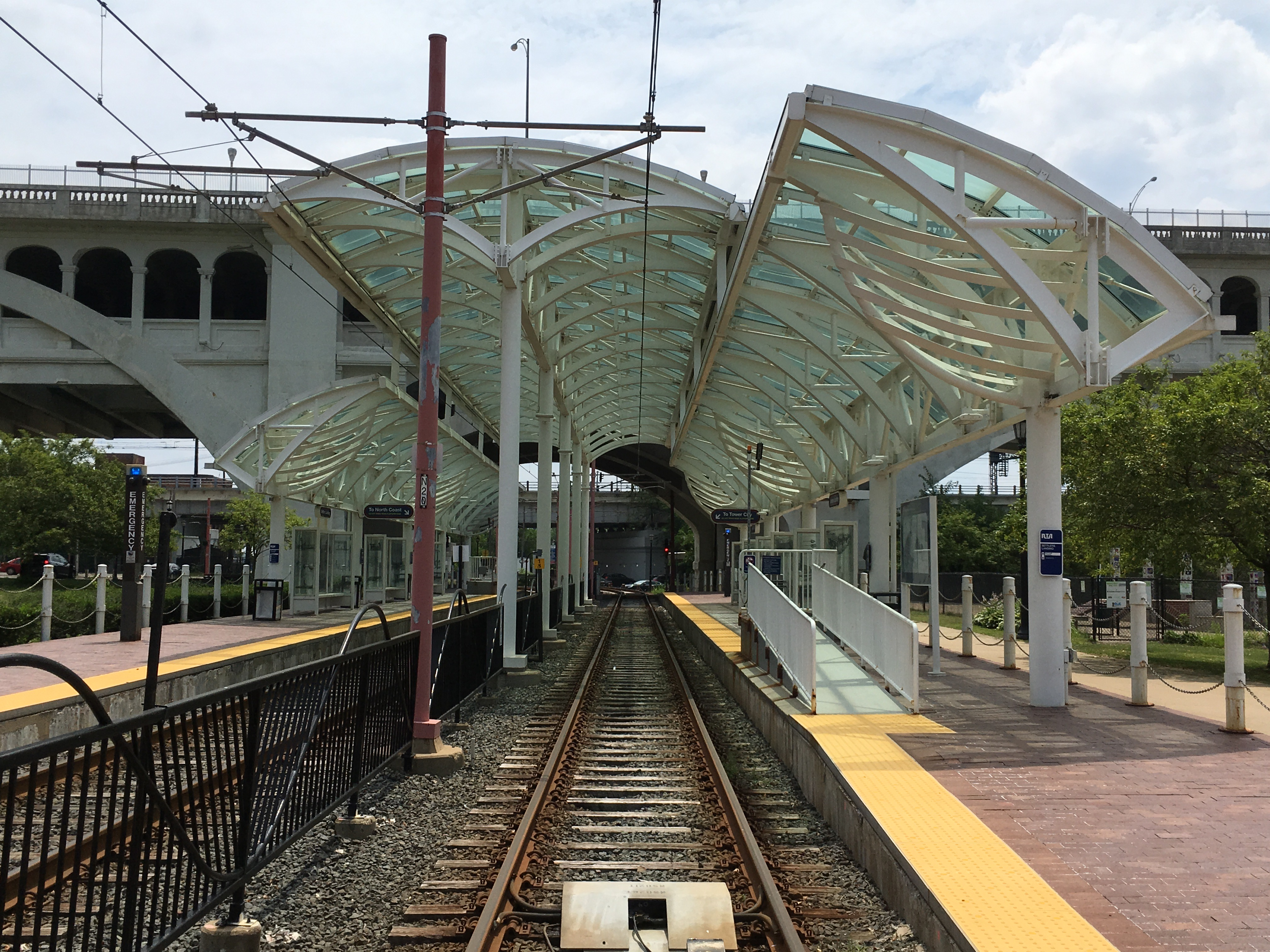
- The Settlers Landing station platforms in July 2018

General information
- Location: 1199 West Superior Avenue; Cleveland, Ohio
- Coordinates: 41°29′47″N 81°42′1″W
- Owner: Greater Cleveland Regional Transit Authority
- Platforms: 2 side platforms
- Tracks: 2

Construction
- Structure type: At-grade
- Cycle facilities: Racks
- Accessible: Yes

Other information
- Status: Unstaffed
- Website: riderta.com/facilities/settlerslanding

History
- Opened: July 10, 1996; 30 years ago

Services
Preceding station	Rapid Transit	Following station
Flats East Bank toward South Harbor	Waterfront Line	Tower City Terminus
Location

Settlers Landing station is a station on the RTA Waterfront Line in Cleveland, Ohio. The station is located just south of the intersection of West Superior Avenue and Old River Road inside Settlers Landing Park, after which the station is named.

It is the first station beyond Tower City station on the Waterfront line, which extended the Green and Blue Lines into The Flats along the east bank of the Cuyahoga River and along the Lake Erie waterfront. The station is adjacent to the Settlers Landing historical site which marks the location where Moses Cleaveland and his surveying team disembarked from the Cuyahoga River to survey the city in 1796.

== History ==
The station opened on July 10, 1996, when light rail service was extended 2.2 miles (3.5 km) from Tower City through The Flats and along the lakefront. This extension was designated the Waterfront Line, although it is actually an extension of the Blue and Green Lines, as trains leaving this station toward Tower City continue along the Blue or Green Line routes to Shaker Heights.

== Station layout ==
The station has two side platforms located inside Settlers Landing Park. The station is located under the viaduct for the Detroit–Superior Bridge. A large glass shelter covers most of platform area and each side has a mini-high platform which allow passengers with disabilities to access trains.

== Notable places nearby ==
- The Flats
- The Warehouse District
- Jacobs Pavilion

== Artwork ==
The station includes eight etched glass panels created by local artist Martin Boyle. The panels join to make up windscreens to shield waiting riders at the outdoor station. Each of the panels, which measure 63 inches by 24 or 20 inches, have fine, detailed etchings of ships, canoes, early settlers in covered wagons and local waterways illustrating different local transportation eras. Each image is hand-drawn in a classical etching style and using a crosshatch technique. One illustration is a map of Cleaveland's route to the Cuyahoga.

== Gallery ==
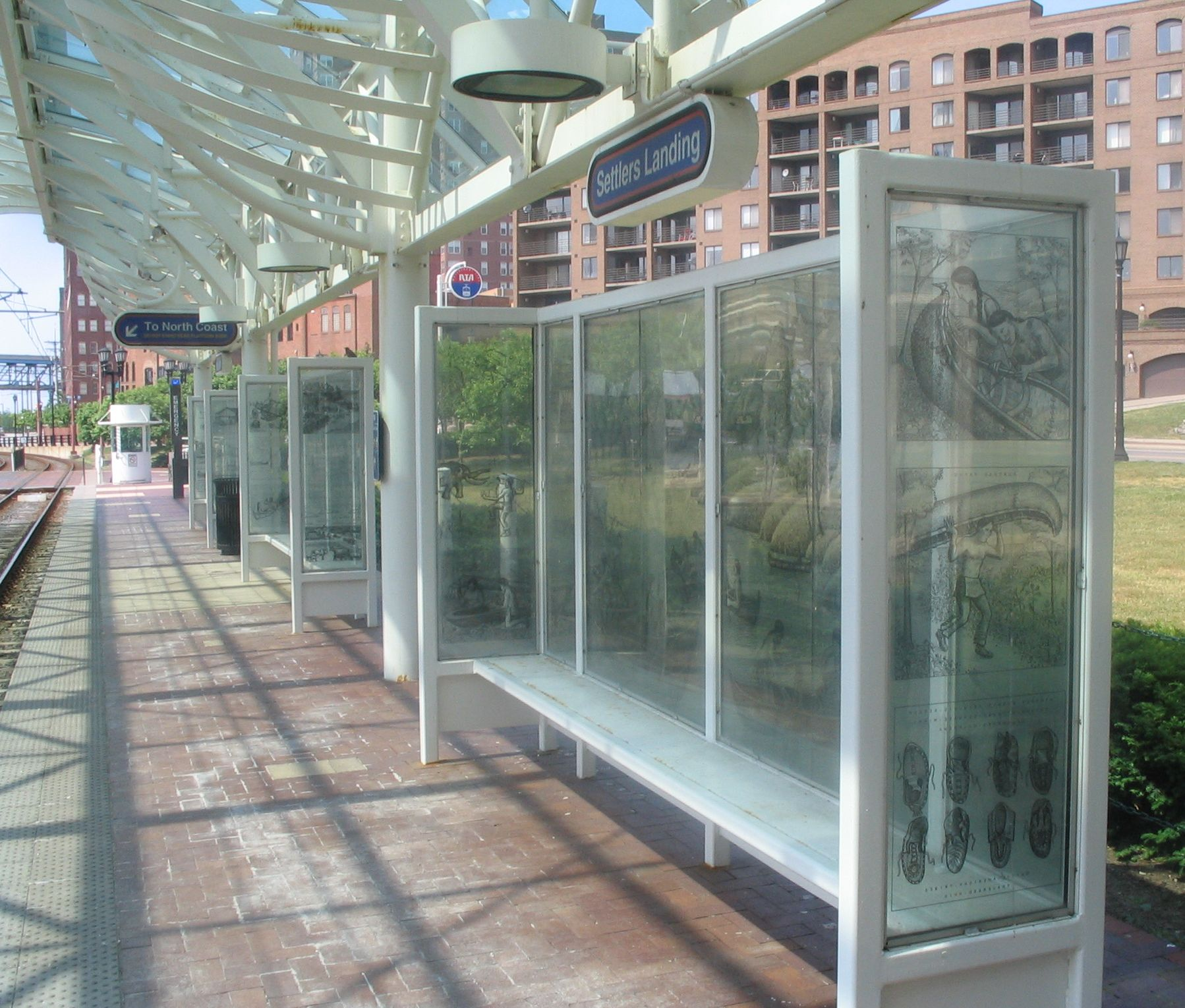

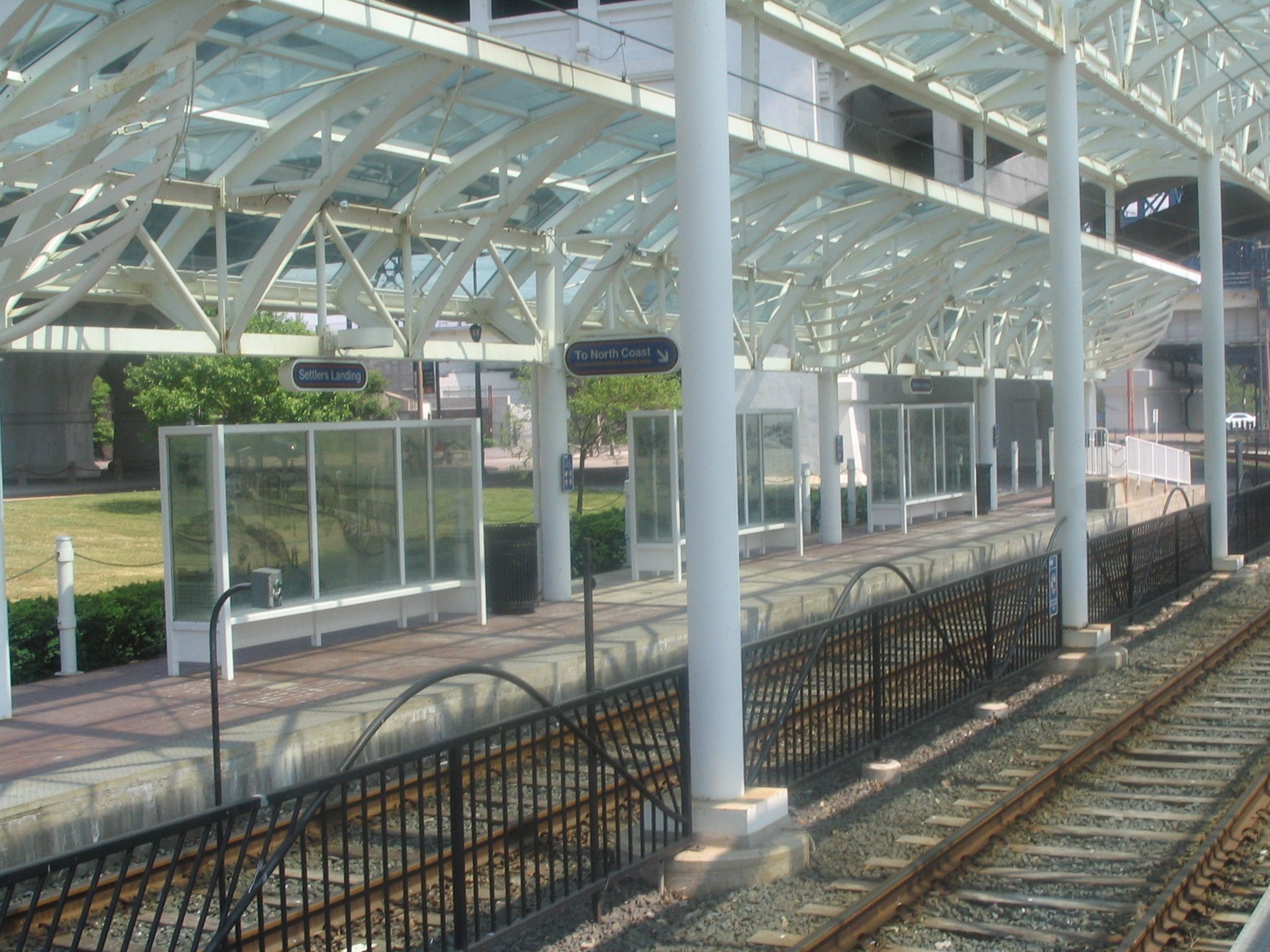

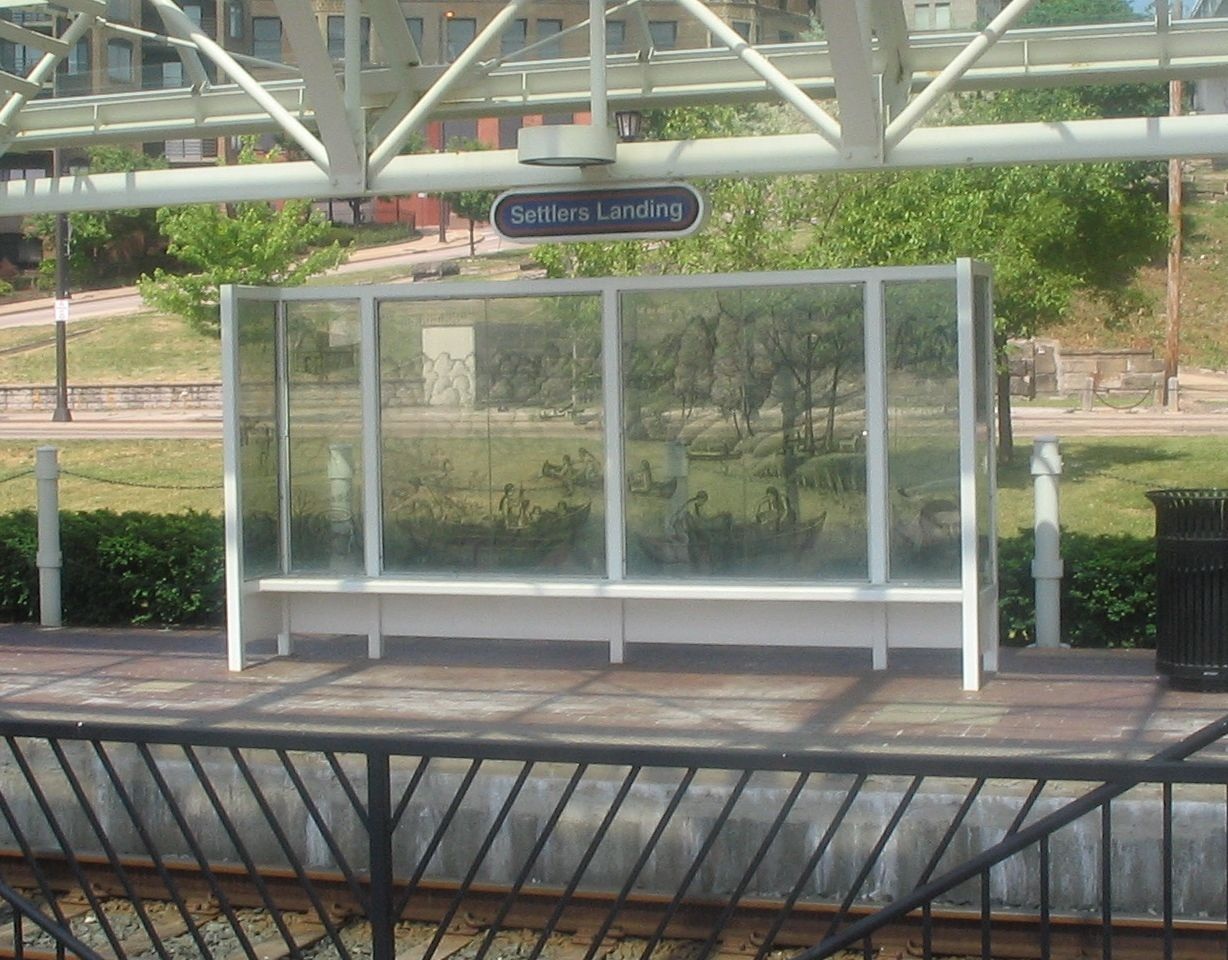

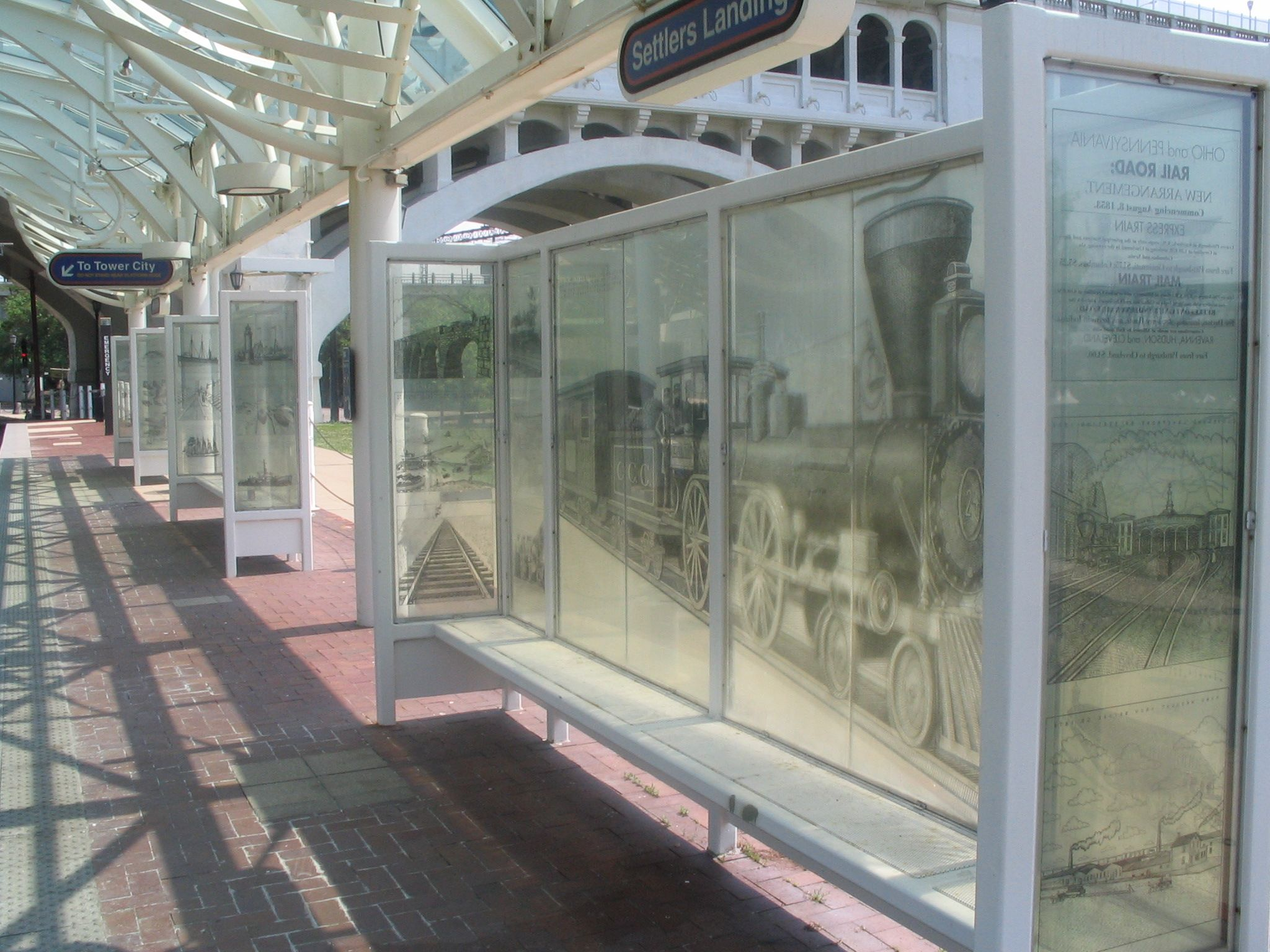

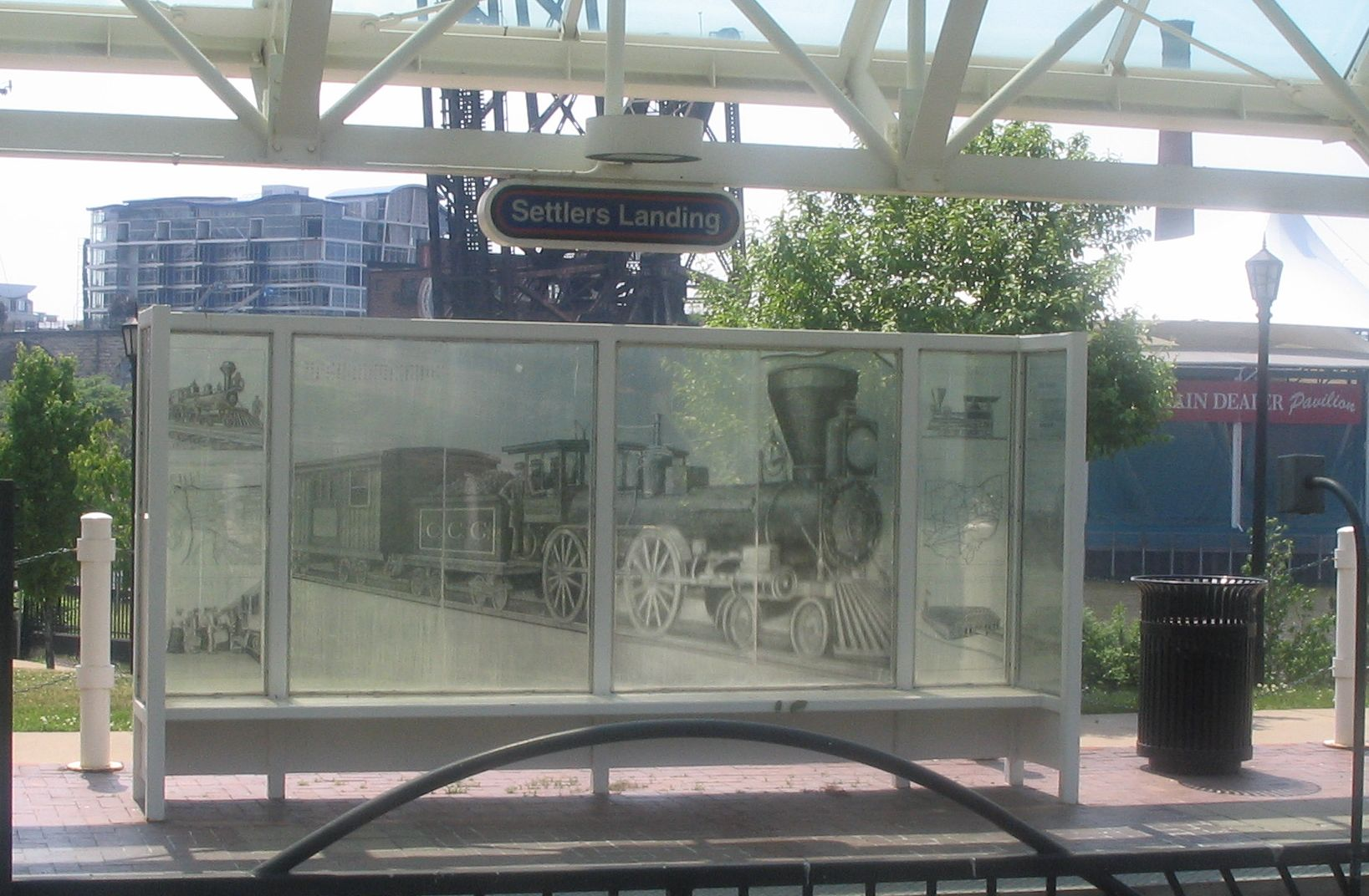

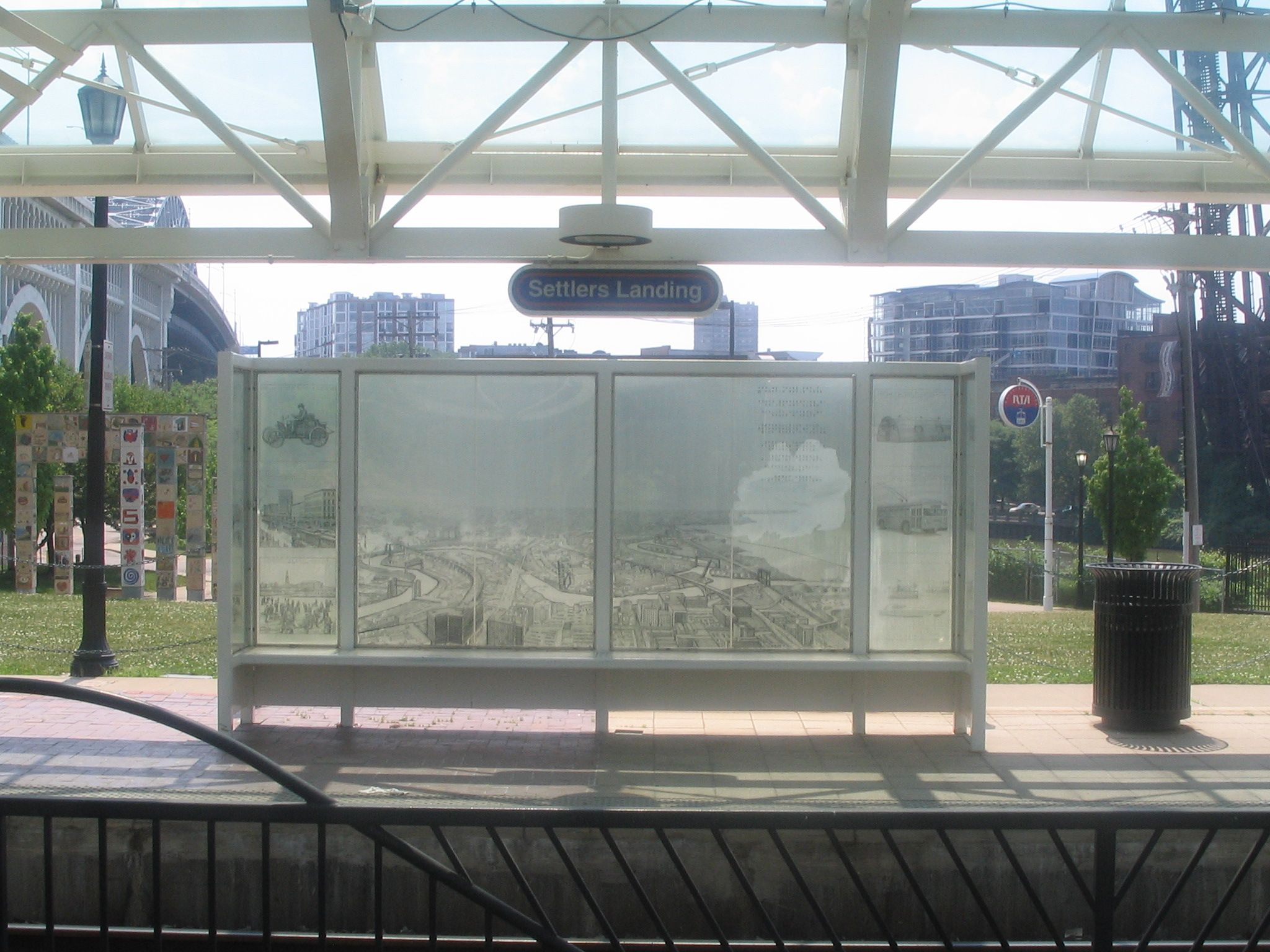
