= West 3rd station =

Rapid transit station in Cleveland

W. 3 St (stadium)
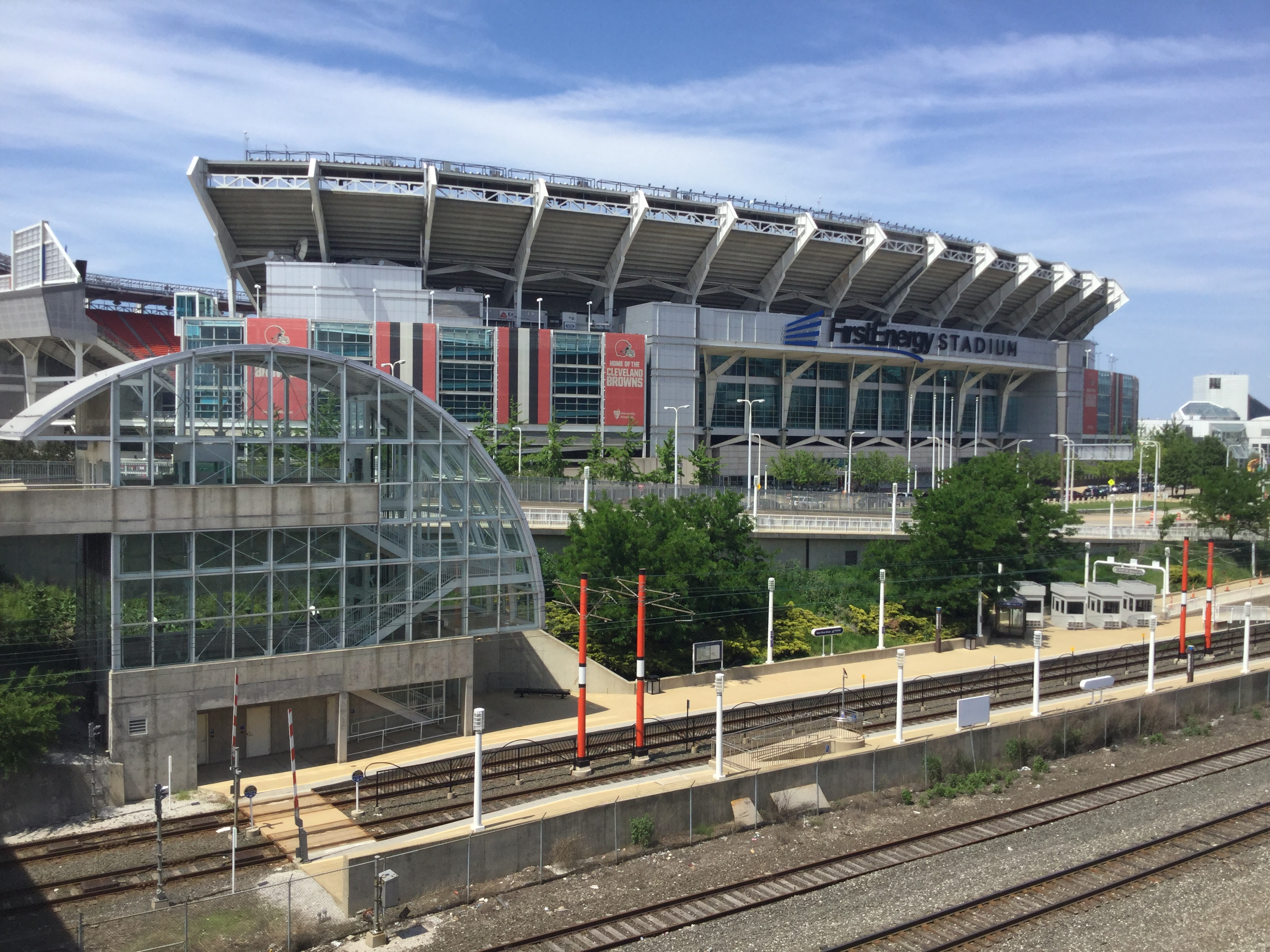
- Station platforms as seen from West 3rd Street

General information
- Location: 200 West 3rd Street; Cleveland, Ohio
- Coordinates: 41°30′15″N 81°41′57″W
- Owner: Greater Cleveland Regional Transit Authority
- Platforms: 2 side platforms
- Tracks: 2

Construction
- Structure type: At-grade
- Parking: Paid parking nearby
- Accessible: Yes

Other information
- Website: riderta.com/facilities/w3

History
- Opened: August 12, 1999; 27 years ago

Services
Preceding station	Rapid Transit	Following station
Flats East Bank toward Tower City	Waterfront Line	Amtrak toward South Harbor
Location

West 3rd station (signed as W. 3 St (stadium)) is a station on the RTA Waterfront Line in Cleveland, Ohio. The station is located below and on the east side of West 3rd Street, after which the station is named. It is located just south of Cleveland Browns Stadium and has been designed to accommodate large event crowds.

== History ==
Foundations for the station were put in place when the Waterfront Line was constructed, but the station did not open with the rest of the Waterfront Line on July 10, 1996, since Cleveland Municipal Stadium was being demolished and construction of Cleveland Browns Stadium had not yet begun. The $5 million station was built closer to the opening of the stadium and opened on August 12, 1999, in time for the first home game.

From 2013 to 2023, the platform was signed as West Third Street FirstEnergy Stadium to correspond with the renaming of Cleveland Browns Stadium to FirstEnergy Stadium. The stadium name reverted to Cleveland Browns Stadium on April 13, 2023.

== Station layout ==
The station has two side platforms, each with a mini-high platform which allow passengers with disabilities to access trains. At street level, the station has a glass enclosed station house with a fare booth (usually unattended) and an elevator and stairs leading down to the inbound side platform. Access to the outbound platform is by crossings that extend across both tracks at each end of the platform.

On the north side of the station there is also a 680-foot-long (210 m) ramp that is used exclusively after events. Passengers are asked to queue in different lines based on their destination to facilitate rapid loading of trains and attendants at booths located at the end of the ramp sell RTA tickets and inspect fares.

== Notable places nearby ==
- Cleveland Browns Stadium
- Justice Center
- The Warehouse District
- Port of Cleveland
- Perry Monument
- Cuyahoga County Courthouse
- Justice Center Complex
- Huntington Convention Center of Cleveland
- Global Center for Health Innovation
- The Mall

== Gallery ==
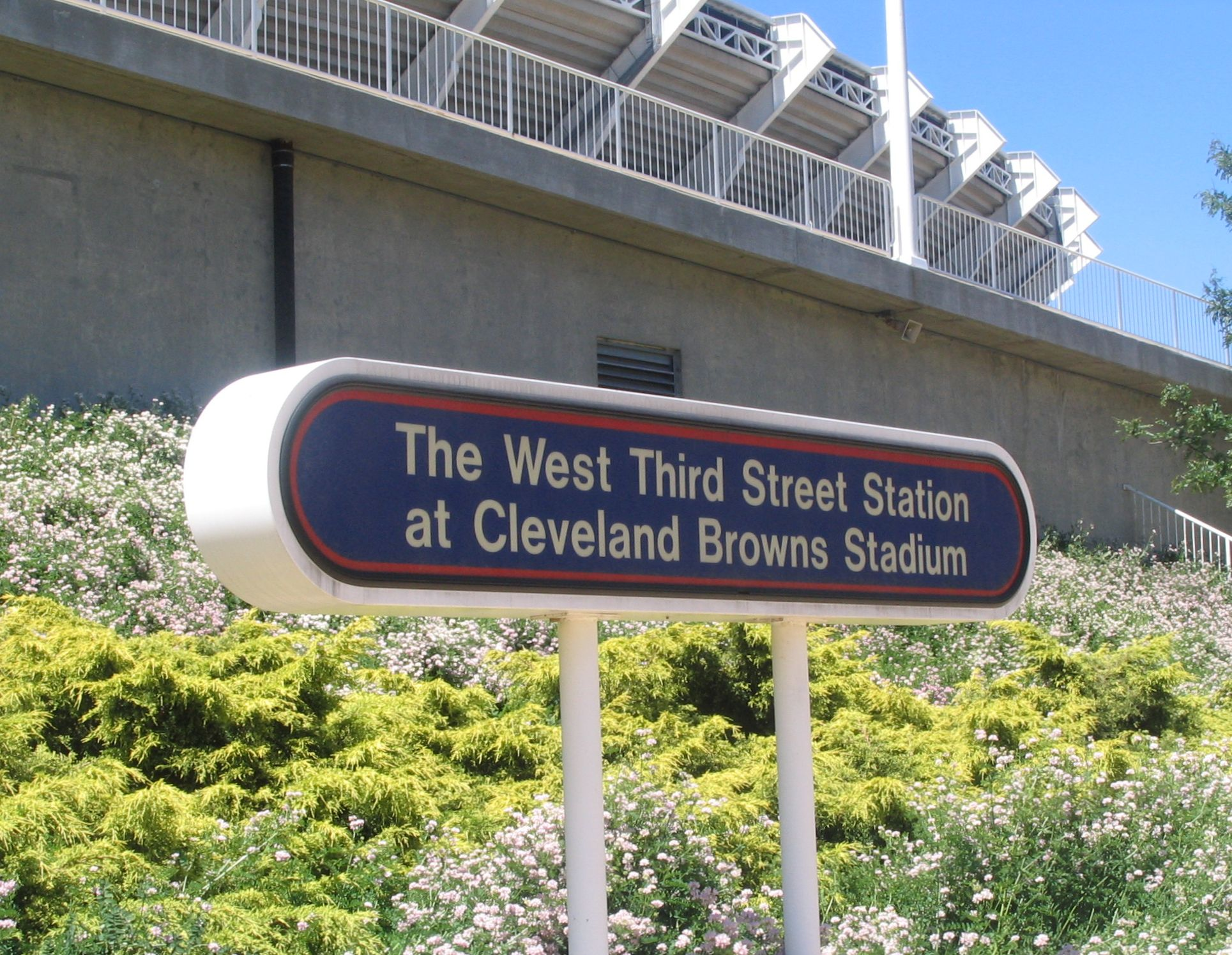
Platform sign in 2007

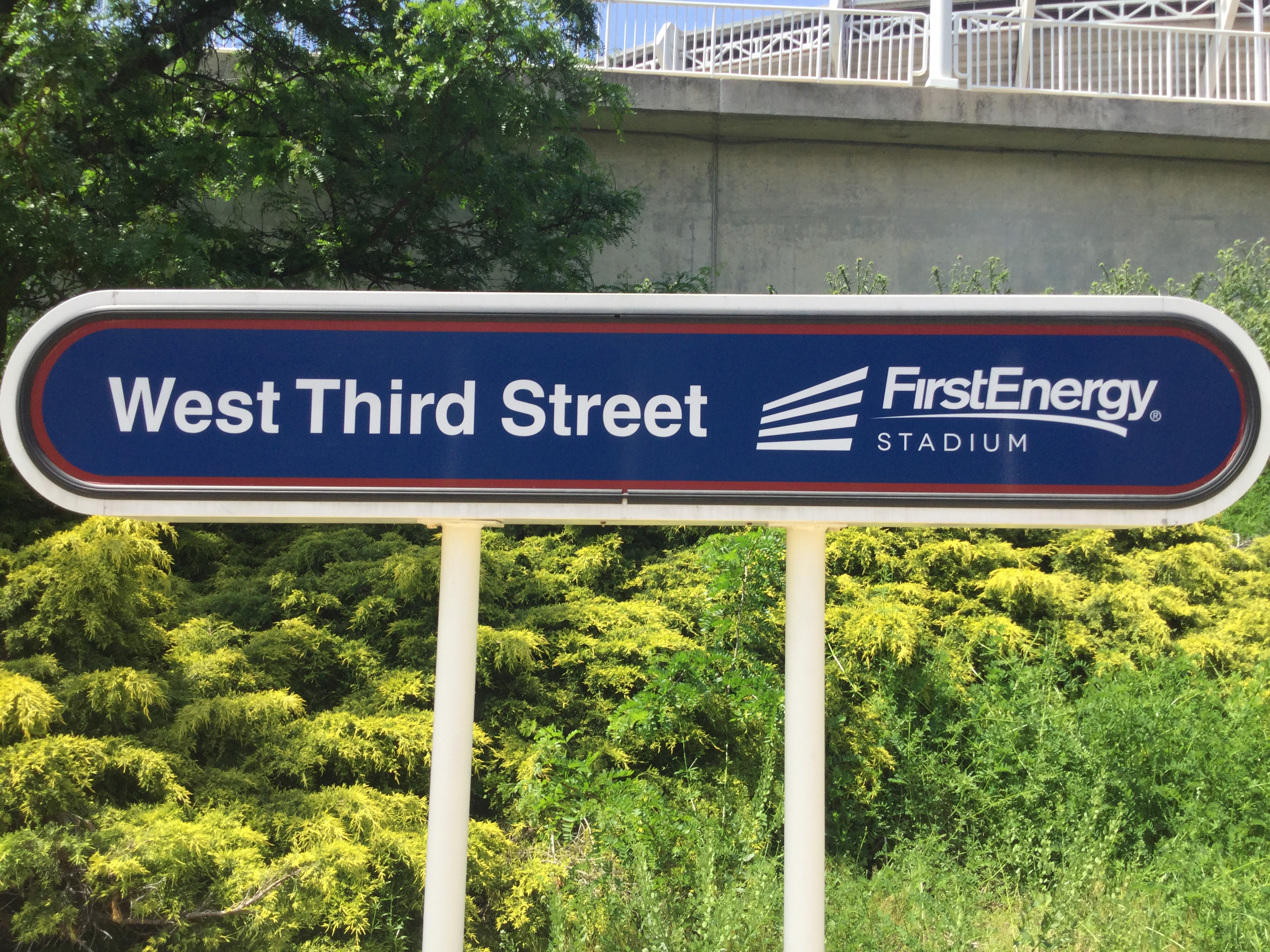
Platform sign in 2018

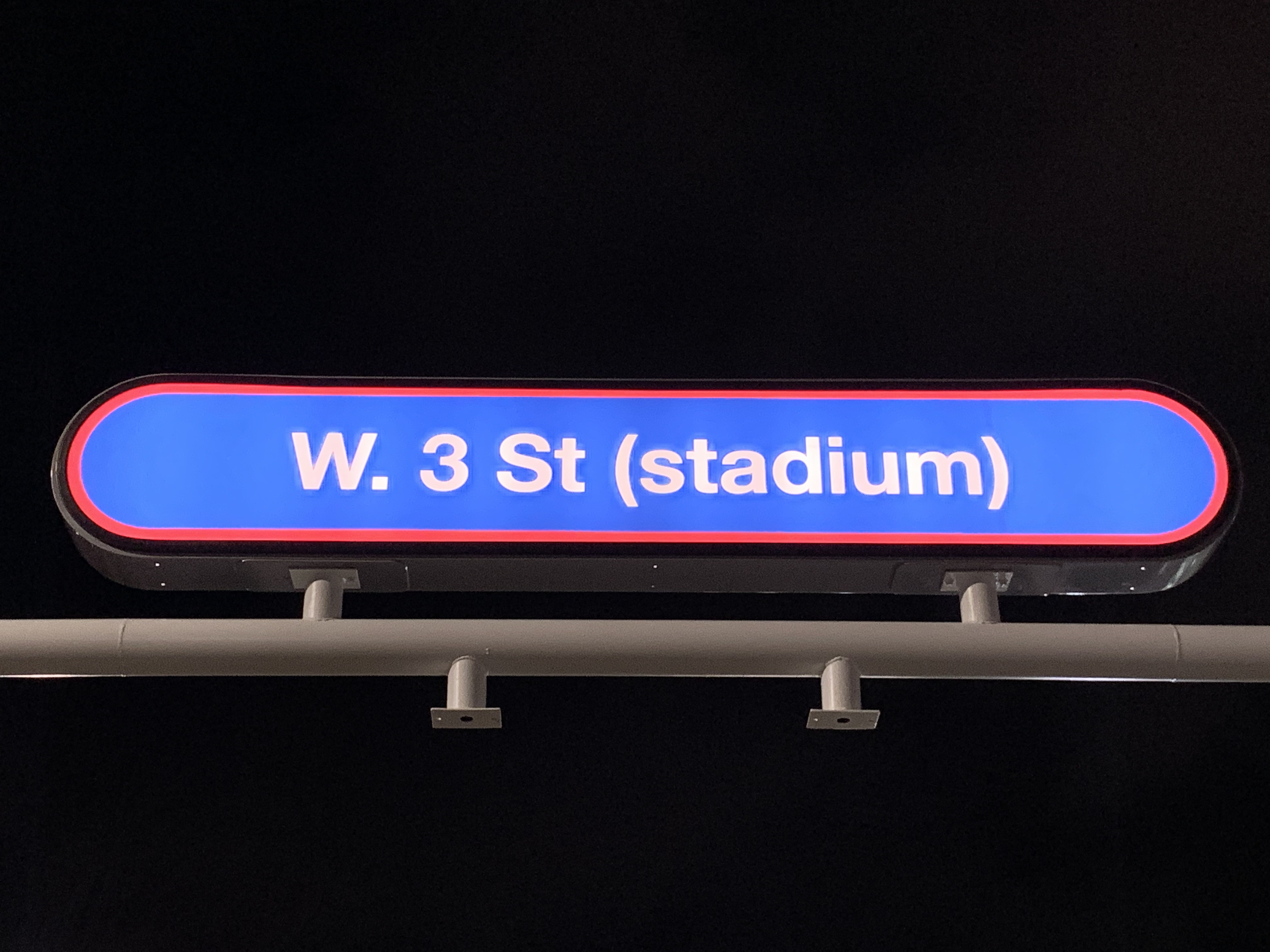
Platform sign in 2023

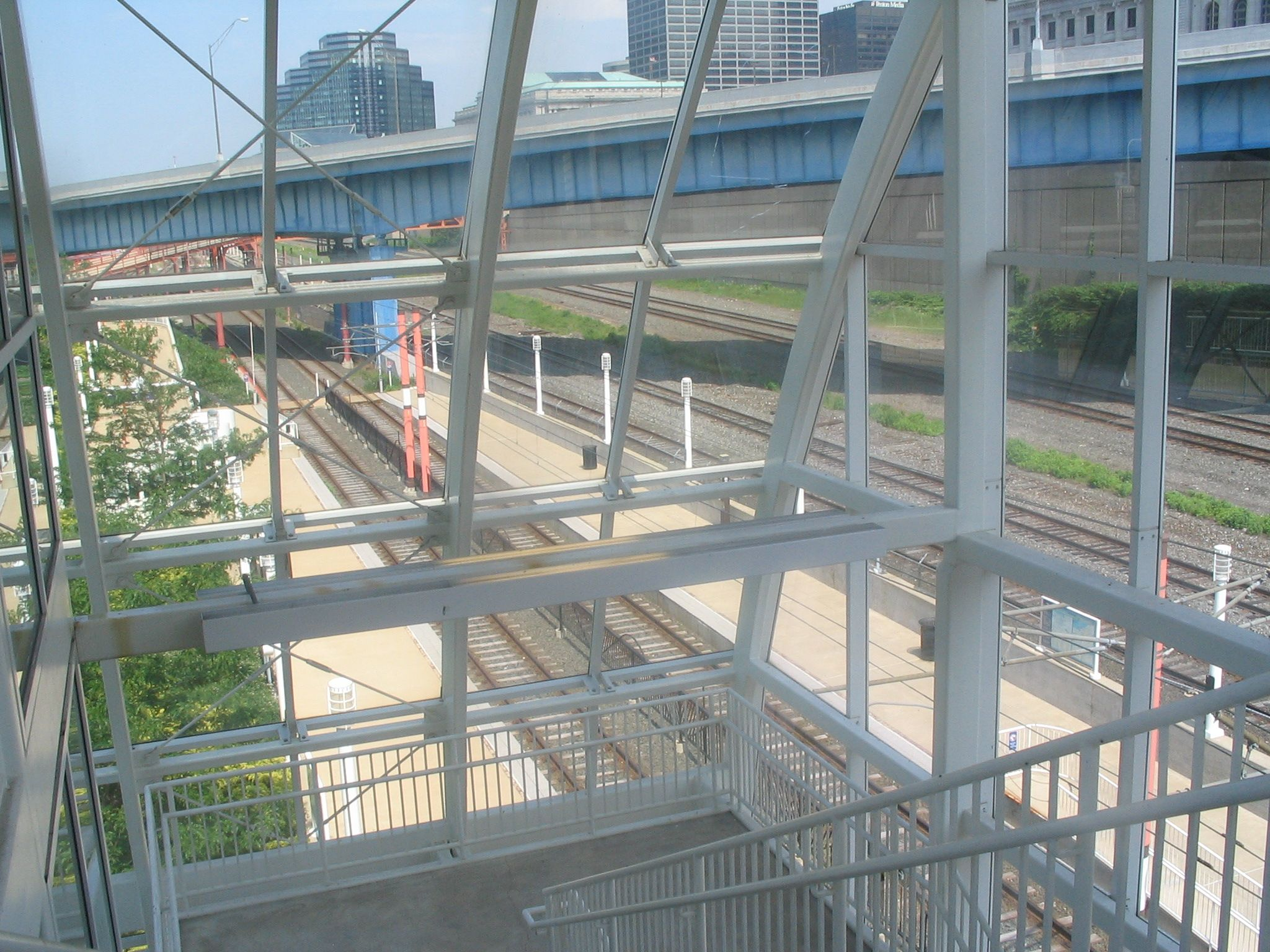
View of platforms from inside station house

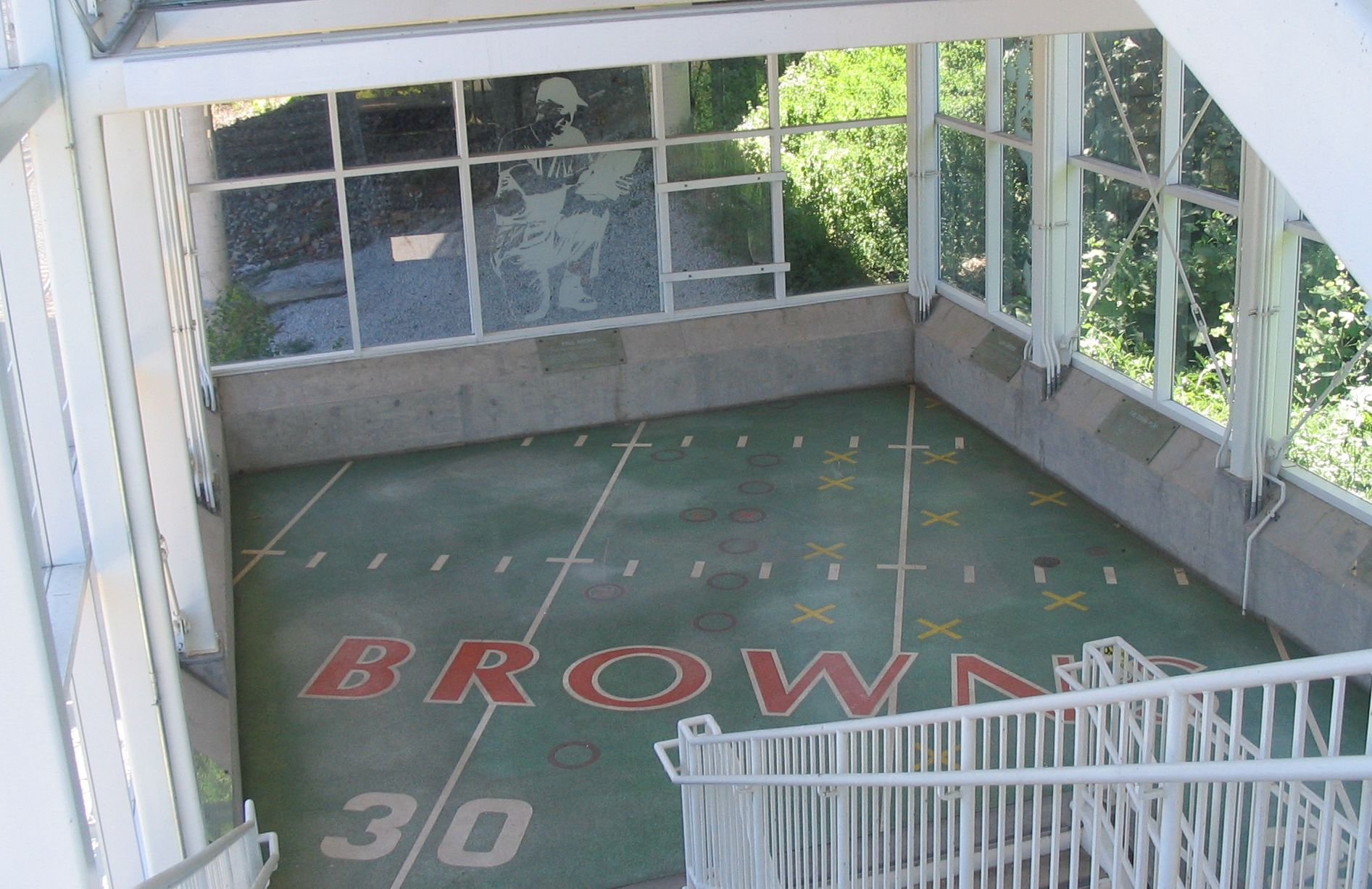
Artwork on stairway landing below lobby

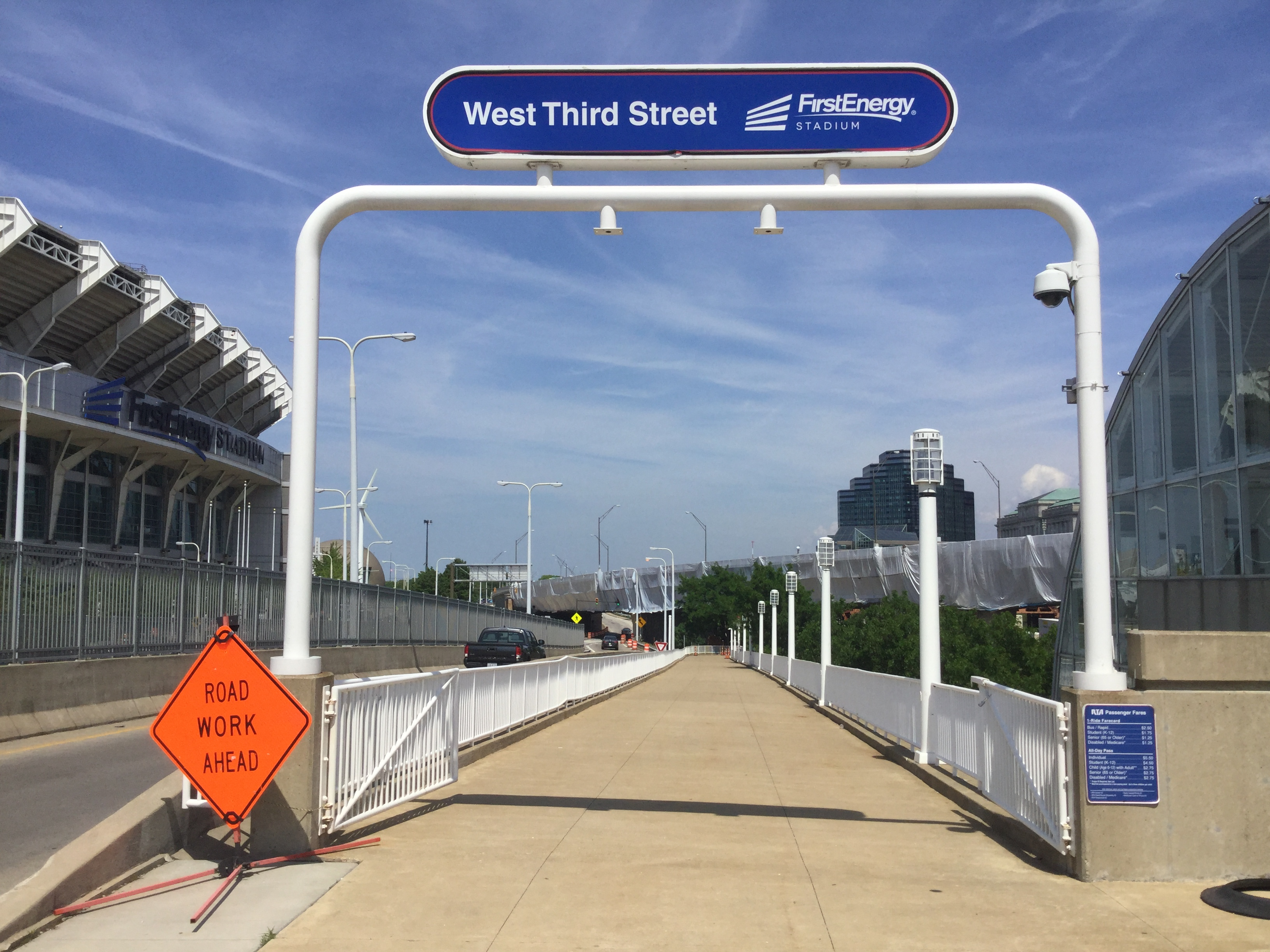
Station ramp in 2018

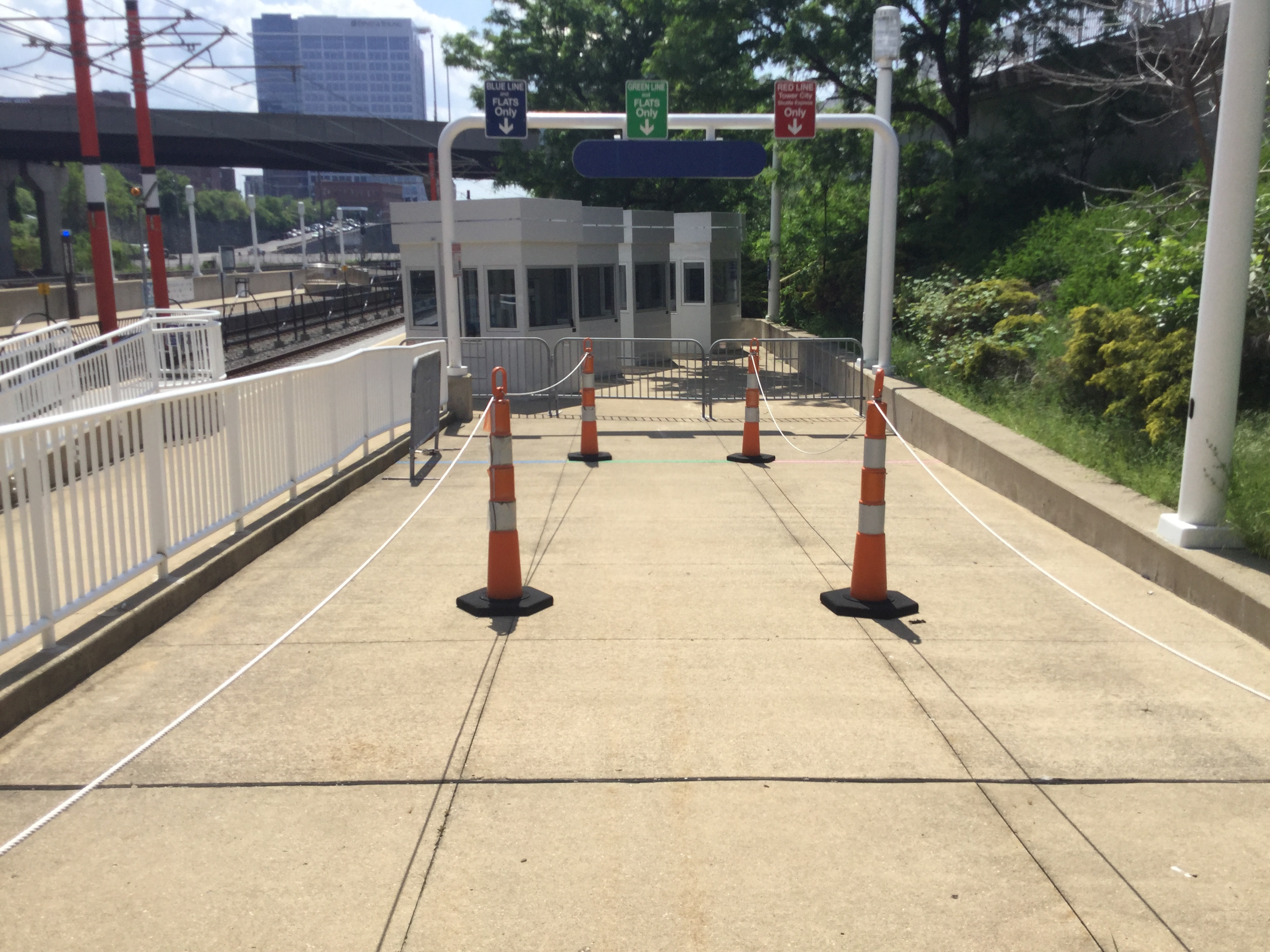
Boarding queues with destination signs
