= The Pinnacle (Cleveland) =

Coordinates: 41°30′01.4″N 81°42′02.4″W

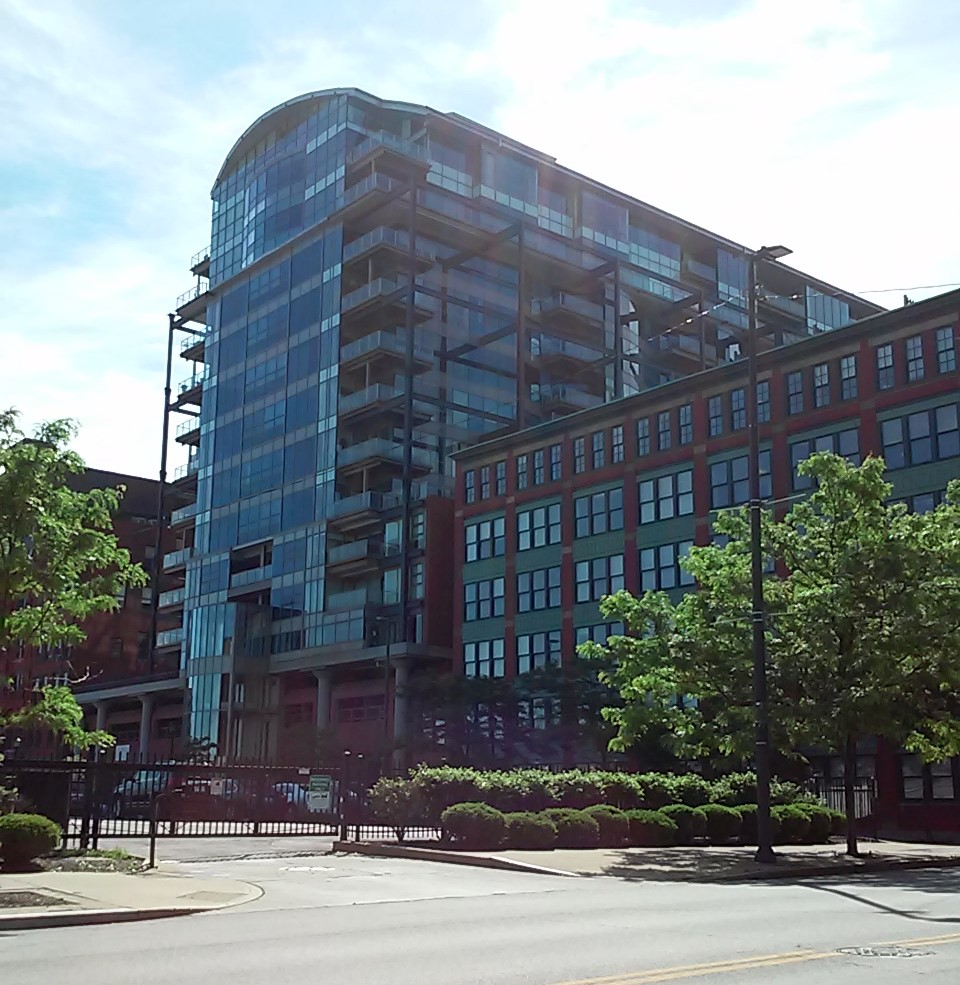
- The Pinnacle building
- Interactive map of the The Pinnacle area

General information
- Type: Residential
- Location: 704 West Lakeside Avenue; Cleveland, Ohio; United States
- Construction started: 2004
- Completed: 2006

Height
- Roof: 181 ft (55 m)

Technical details
- Floor count: 14

Design and construction
- Architect: Schmidt Copeland Parker Stevens

Other information
- Public transit access: Flats East Bank

The Pinnacle is a postmodern 2006 completed 181 foot 14 story condominium high-rise in downtown Cleveland's historic Warehouse District. The Pinnacle faces the off ramp of the Cleveland Memorial Shoreway or (Ohio State Route 2). The building extends back for nearly a city block. It sits on top of a parking structure that was built before the tower. It is the second tallest building in the Warehouse District after The Crittenden.

== Design and history ==
The building was erected at a time when the city of Cleveland was in need of expanding the occupancy availability in the downtown neighborhood. Occupancy rates are still high in the city, which has brought more projects on the horizon to fill the needed demand. The condos rise high above the low structures of the Warehouse District and offer panoramic views of the surrounding downtown districts. The property is currently managed by the Citi Roc firm which markets the tower as a high-end residential experience not offered anywhere else in the downtown neighborhood, though this has been placed in doubt to several new skyscraper constructions elsewhere in downtown.
