= Waterfront Line =

Light rail line of the RTA Rapid Transit system

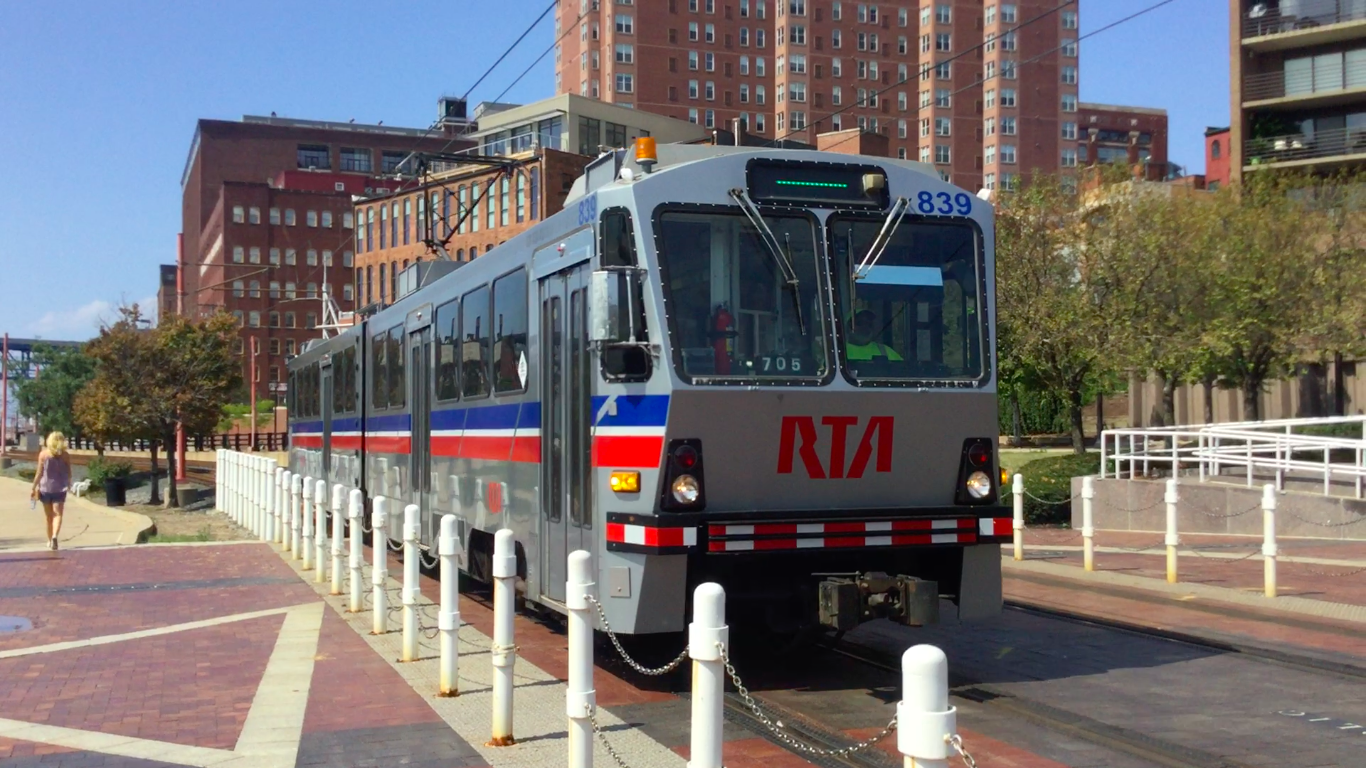
- A Waterfront Line train approaching Settlers Landing

Overview
- Status: Limited service to event days
- Locale: Cleveland, Cuyahoga County, Ohio
- Termini: South Harbor; Tower City
- Stations: 7

Service
- Type: Light rail/Tram
- System: RTA Rapid Transit

History
- Opened: July 10, 1996
- Closed: October 26, 2020
- Reopened: September 10, 2023
Route map
Waterfront Line highlighted in blue-green

The Waterfront Line is a light rail line of the RTA Rapid Transit system in Cleveland, Ohio, running from Tower City Center downtown, then north and northeast to South Harbor station, adjacent to the Cleveland Municipal Parking Lot. The Waterfront Line is the newest rail line in Cleveland, having opened in 1996. The 2.2 mile (3.5 km) line is unique in that it is an extension of the Blue and Green lines, but has its own naming designation. All RTA light rail lines use overhead lines and pantographs to draw power. Due to safety concerns, the line was closed from 2021 to 2023, but has since been re-opened, providing service for Cleveland Browns games only.

== History ==
The line opened on July 10, 1996, coinciding with Cleveland's bicentennial celebration which took place later in the year. The line had a total cost of $70.9 million and was funded by a combination of bonds, grant money from the Ohio Department of Transportation, and local RTA funding. Service on the Waterfront Line was suspended indefinitely in 2021, after previously being suspended in October 2020. Plans called for opening in time for the 2023 Cleveland Browns season. On September 10, 2023, rail service resumed on the Waterfront Line.

== Route description ==
From South Harbor, the lines extends generally west-southwest adjacent to the former New York Central Railroad tracks, now owned by Norfolk Southern. Notable destinations along the line include the Rock and Roll Hall of Fame and Cleveland Browns Stadium. Trains will stop at Amtrak's Cleveland Lakefront Station upon request.

The line continues along an elevated loop, allowing it to turn from west-southwest to south-southeast, cross over the Norfolk Southern tracks and travel along the east bank of The Flats. The route passes through three grade crossings.

The line then turns east and climbs up from The Flats in two cuts on either side of the Red Line. It merges onto the Red Line tracks and travels through Tower City. Through service between the Waterfront Line and the Blue and Green Lines is provided at Tower City.

From April 2010 through May 2013, RTA eliminated weekday regularly scheduled Waterfront Line service due to low ridership and trains ran on the line only on weekends and for special events. Though seven-day-a-week service on the line was restored, a number of trains continue to use Tower City as a western terminus.

Tower City is the major station on all RTA Rapid Transit lines. It is the main station serving downtown Cleveland and it provides a convenient transfer point between the Red Line and the Blue and Green Lines.

== Service ==
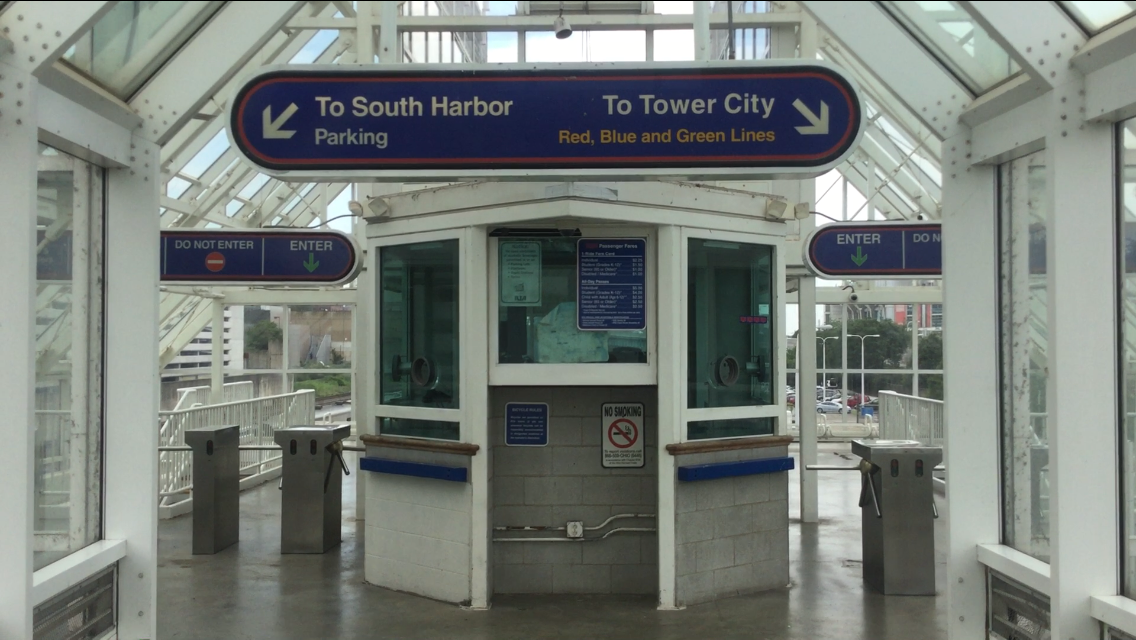
East 9th–North Coast station turnstiles in 2017

As of March 2026, the line provides service for Cleveland Browns games only.

=== Rail replacement bus ===
During rail shutdowns, RTA uses replacement buses signed as route 67R. These shuttle buses run between Tower City and South Harbor on surface streets.

== Stations ==
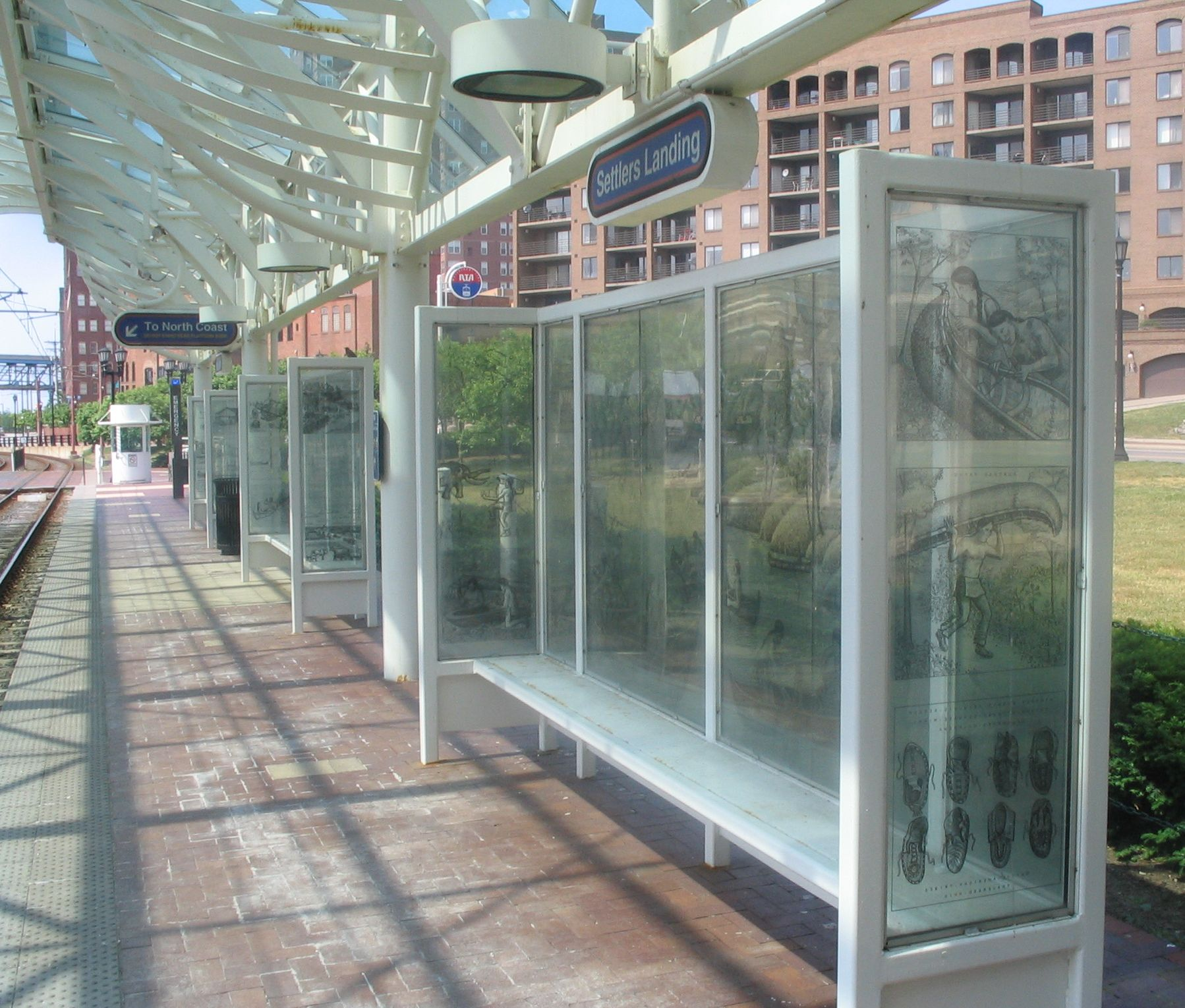
Platform at Settlers Landing

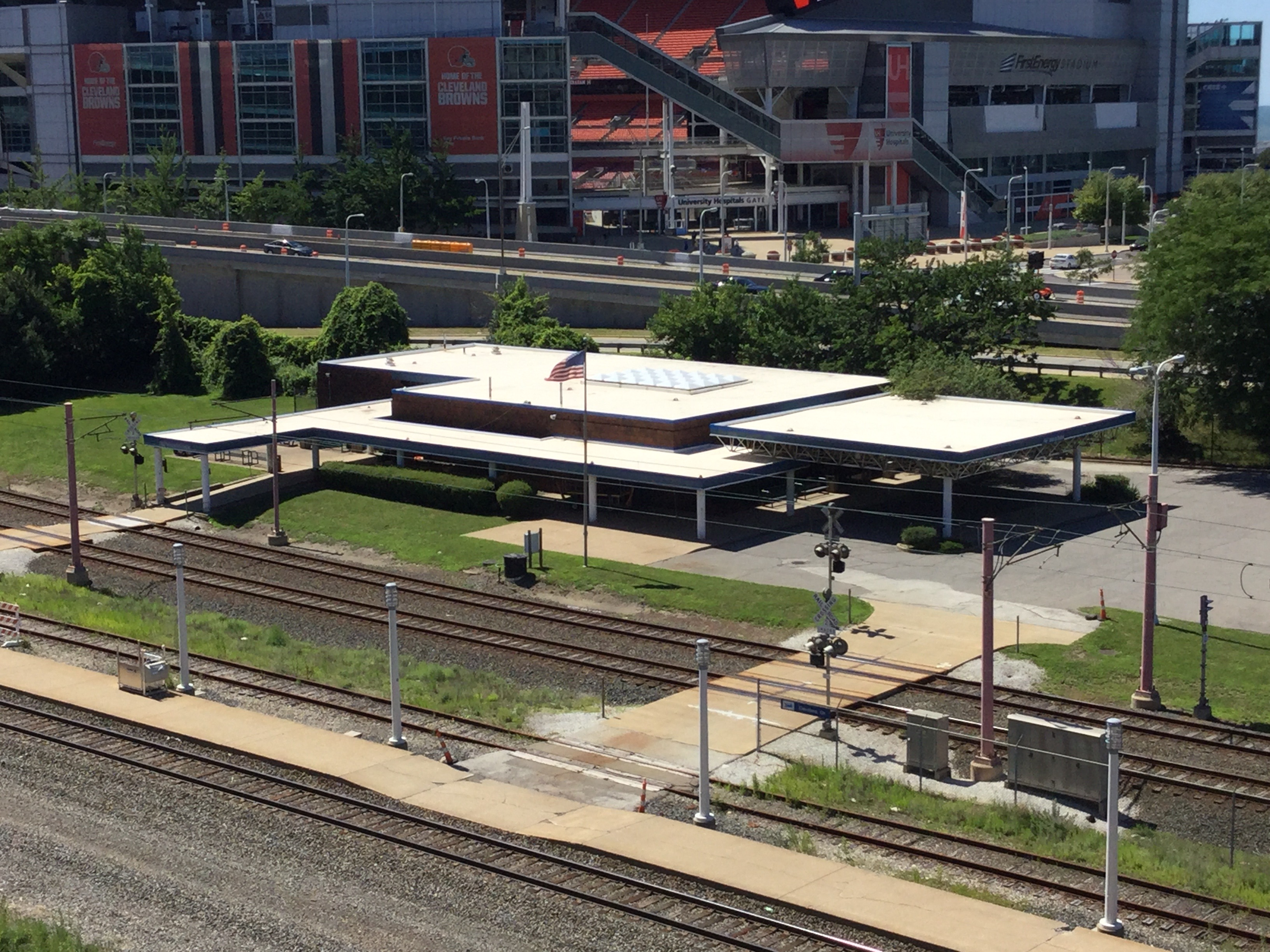
Riders may use the flag stop at Cleveland Lakefront Station, but Amtrak trains arrive in the middle of the night

All stations are located within Downtown Cleveland.

Station	Date opened	Date rebuilt	Connections / notes
South Harbor	July 10, 1996		
East 9th–North Coast	July 10, 1996		Laketran: 10, 11, 12
Amtrak	December 1997		Amtrak: Floridian, Lake Shore Limited
West 3rd	August 12, 1999		
Flats East Bank	July 10, 1996		
Settlers Landing	July 10, 1996		
Tower City	July 20, 1930	December 17, 1990	RTA Rapid Transit: Red Blue Green; RTA BRT: HealthLine; RTA Bus: 1, 3, 8, 9, 11, 14, 14A, 15, 19, 19A, 19B, 22, 25, 26, 26A, 39, 45, 51, 51A, 53, 53A, 55, 55B, 55C, 71, 77, 90, 251; Laketran: 10, 11, 12; METRO RTA: 61; PARTA: 100; SARTA: 4
