= The Flats =

Historic district in Cleveland, Ohio

Coordinates: 41.492°N 81.696°W

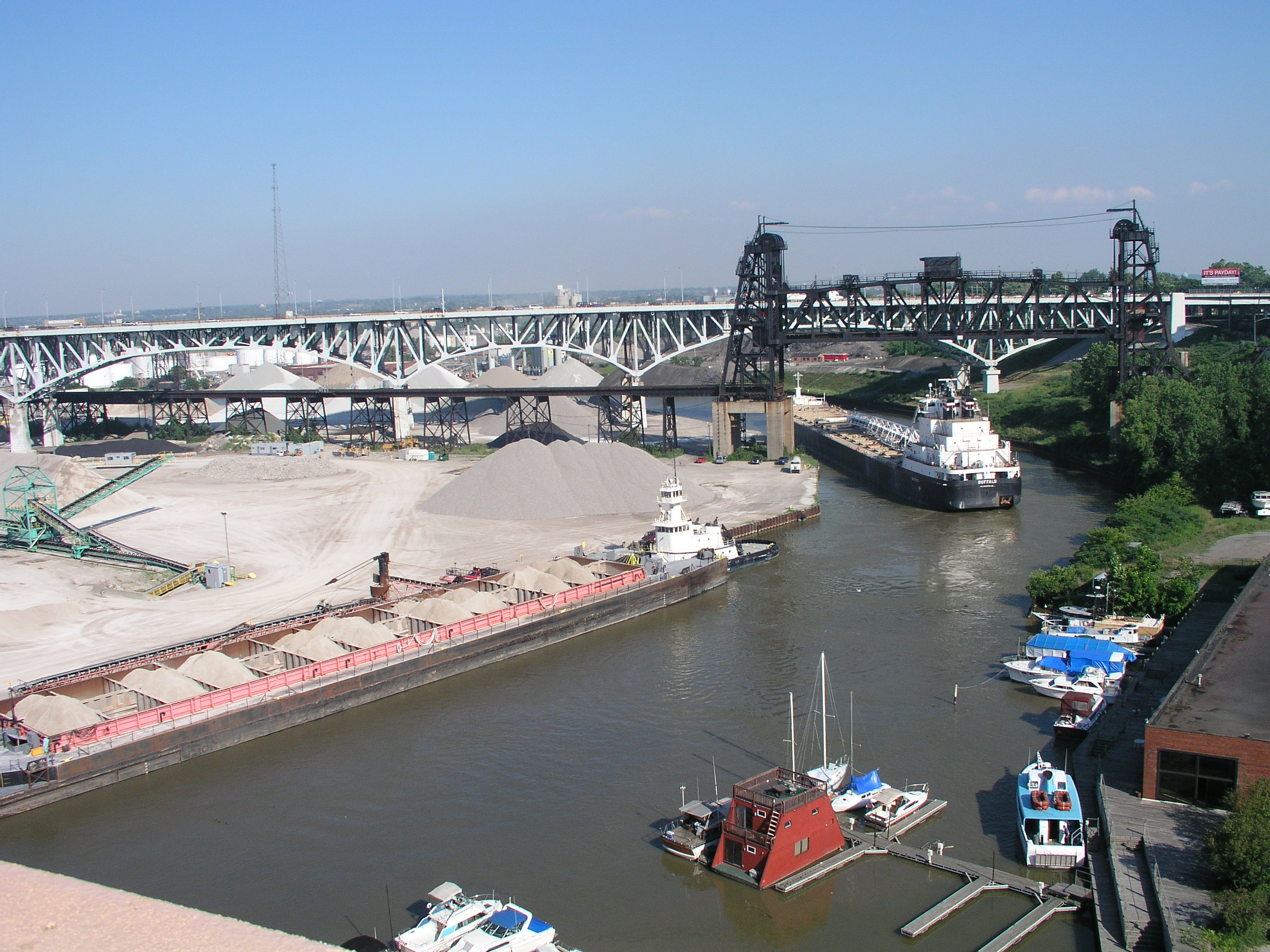
The Cuyahoga River and the industrial flats.

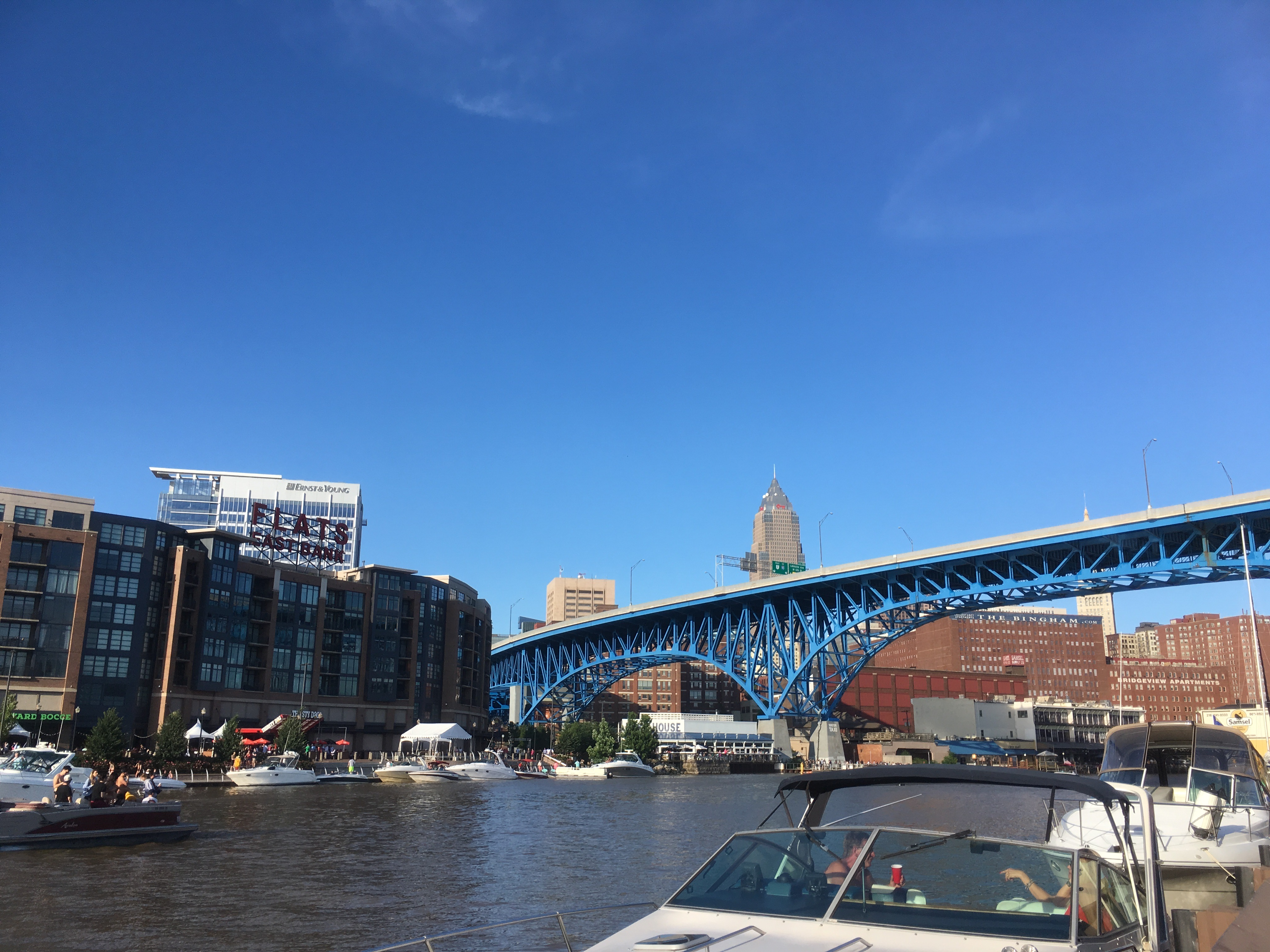
The Flats close to Jacobs Pavilion.

The Flats is a mixed-use industrial, recreational, entertainment, and residential area of the Cuyahoga Valley neighborhood of Cleveland, Ohio, U.S. The name reflects its low-lying topography on the banks of the Cuyahoga River.

== History ==
=== Early days ===
In 1796, Moses Cleaveland and his survey party landed on the banks of the Cuyahoga upon their arrival from Connecticut. Early settlers included Lorenzo Carter, whose land holdings included much of what makes up today's East Bank entertainment district, including Whiskey Island, which was created when the mouth of the river was straightened by the Corps of Engineers.

Early residents found the Flats inhospitable with humid summers that brought airborne illness and harsh winters with strong winds and snowfall off Lake Erie. Many took to higher ground in current-day Downtown.

Cleveland developed slowly until the arrival of the Ohio and Erie Canal, which brought a trade route from the Ohio River and other southern Ohio cities. The heavily Irish immigrant workforce that built the canal took residence on the West Bank of the Flats and neighboring Ohio City.

==== Bridge war ====
Ohio City's rise, fueled by the produce that flowed from Medina County farms along U.S. 42 to the West Side Market, was soon viewed as a threat to Cleveland's development. In response, Cleveland destroyed its half of a floating bridge at Main Street (Main Street Bridge, located near the modern Main Avenue Bridge) which was the sole river crossing. Cleveland then built a new bridge further downstream (Columbus Road Bridge) which connected Cleveland Mayor John W. Willey and developer/friend Jas Clark's "Willeyville" and "Cleveland Centre" developments along the newly constructed Columbus Road. The new bridge diverted the produce trade from the West Side Market to the new Central Market. Infuriated Ohio City residents, rallying with the cry of "Two bridges or none," marched on the new bridge with guns, axes, and other tools. They met a mob of Cleveland residents ready to fight; the ensuing "Bridge War" was put down by county sheriff's officers. The courts ultimately forced Cleveland to rebuild its half of the Main Street Bridge, but the damage had been done, and Ohio City soon became the first area to be annexed by the larger city.

=== Industrial center ===
A recession in the mid-19th century caused the Cleveland Centre mixed commercial and residential plan to collapse, and the land was purchased by industrialists connected to the canal and growing railroad lines. The cities' poor Irish lived along the West Bank in the "Irish Ghetto" near the intersection of Columbus, Carter, Franklin, and Riverbed Roads. Shipmen would find services at establishments like the "Flat Iron", the oldest Irish Bar in the Flats, which was originally a four-story cafeteria and inn. Lumberyards lined the river with freshly cut wood waiting to be shipped. John D. Rockefeller's Standard Oil Company on the East Bank was putting Cleveland on the map as an industrial power.

The Flats' industrial legacy, however, would be defined by its steel mills, located along the river south of the Tremont neighborhood and west of the Slavic Village. The mills were the pillar of the city's economy and the largest consumer of water and electricity. Post-war recessions and production shifts to China and Europe hit the steel industry hard. Layoffs in the late 1970s forced many to find work elsewhere, or support from welfare programs. During this time, Cleveland, along with other industrial cities in the region like Youngstown, Pittsburgh, Detroit and Gary, had become known as the Rust Belt. LTV's repeated bankruptcies finally led to the closing their plants in 2000 (including Cleveland's plant), until investors formed ISG and resumed scaled-back operations.

Over the second half of the 20th century, much of the industry and manufacturing in the Flats closed, leaving decaying buildings and persistent pollution. The chemical-clotted Cuyahoga River caught fire several times; most recently in 1969.

=== Nightlife hotspot ===
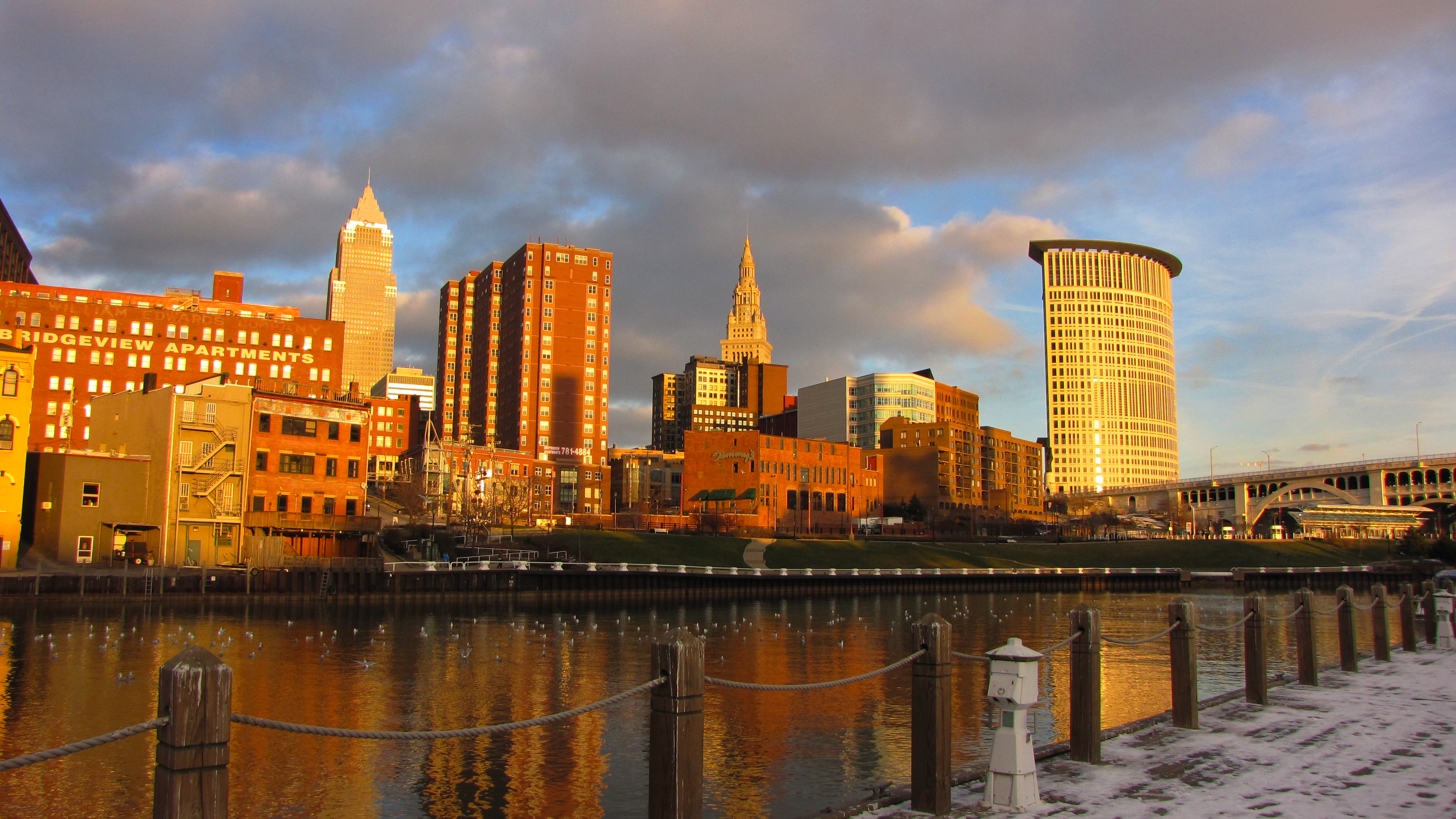
The Flats and Downtown Cleveland, Ohio, as seen from the west bank of the Cuyahoga River.

In the mid-1980s, the Flats saw a resurgence as an entertainment destination. Underground music venues appeared on the East Bank, while mainstream development first took place on the West Bank. The Powerhouse, built to power the city's cable cars, was renovated to include multiple bars, restaurants, and an outdoor music venue. Other warehouses and buildings were also renovated into nightlife destinations. At its peak in the early 1990s, the Flats had the highest concentration of bars in the Midwest, with both locally owned bars, nightclubs, and national restaurant chains lining both sides of the river from the mouth to the Oxbow bend. The Flats and Cleveland had soon become an entertainment mecca and destination for the region. The Flats Oxbow Association was formed to help redevelop the Flats, and housing development soon followed on both sides of the river, with new construction and warehouses being converted into condominiums and apartments.

The Flats' 20th century heyday as an entertainment destination was short-lived. Three drowning deaths in one month in 2000, along with a city crackdown on fire and health code violations led to the closing of many bars. Patrons becoming scared off due to safety concerns led to a sharp decrease in business. While this was a boon for the redevelopment for the Warehouse District, the area just up the hill from the East Bank, it sent shock waves through the Flats' redevelopment. Most of the East Bank went "dark" due to the number of businesses that have closed.

In the early 2000s, The West Bank fared better than the East Bank with longtime businesses like Shooters and the Harbor Inn remaining open, and the construction of condominiums at the remains of the Superior Viaduct in 2005.

=== 21st century revival ===
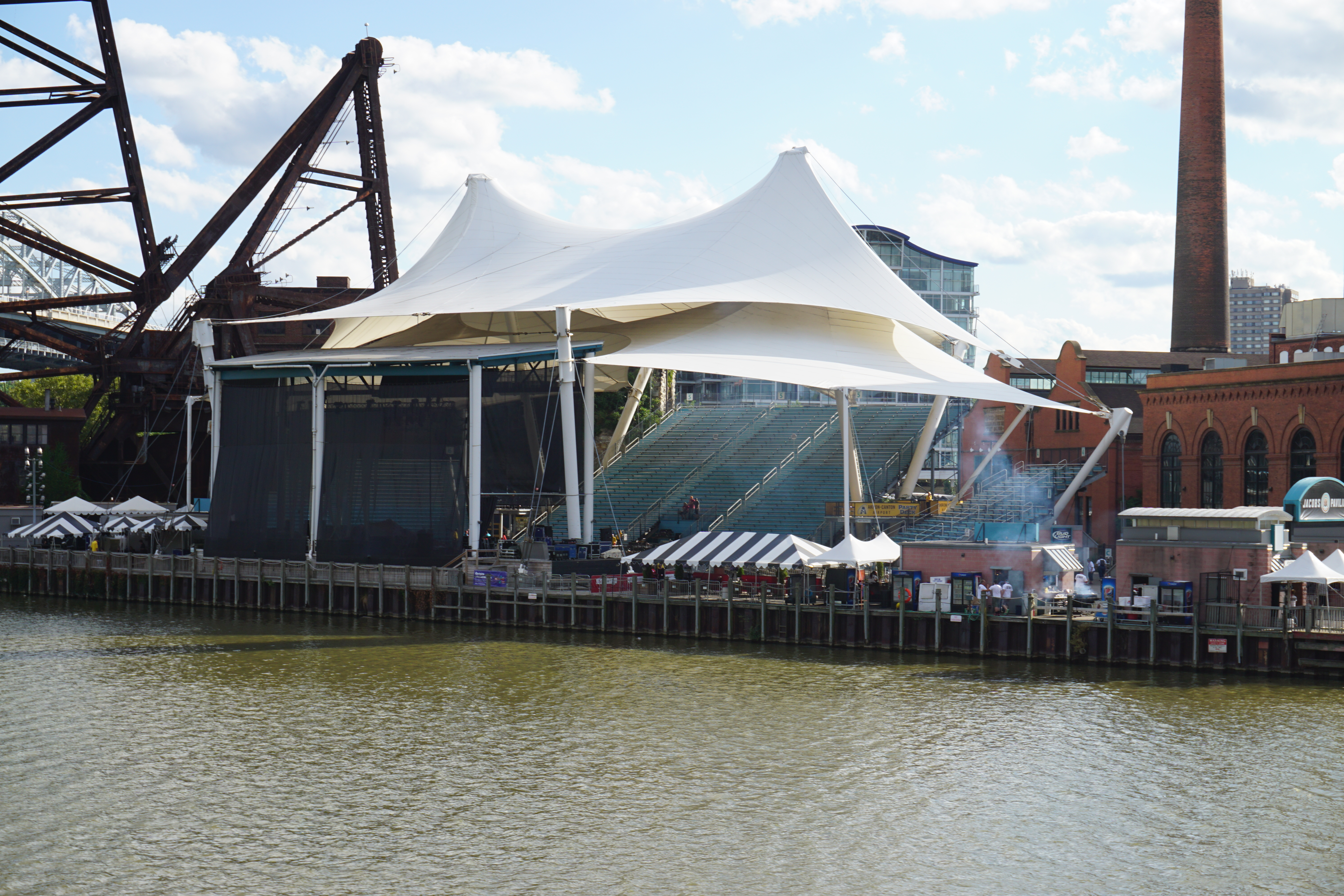
Jacobs Pavilion

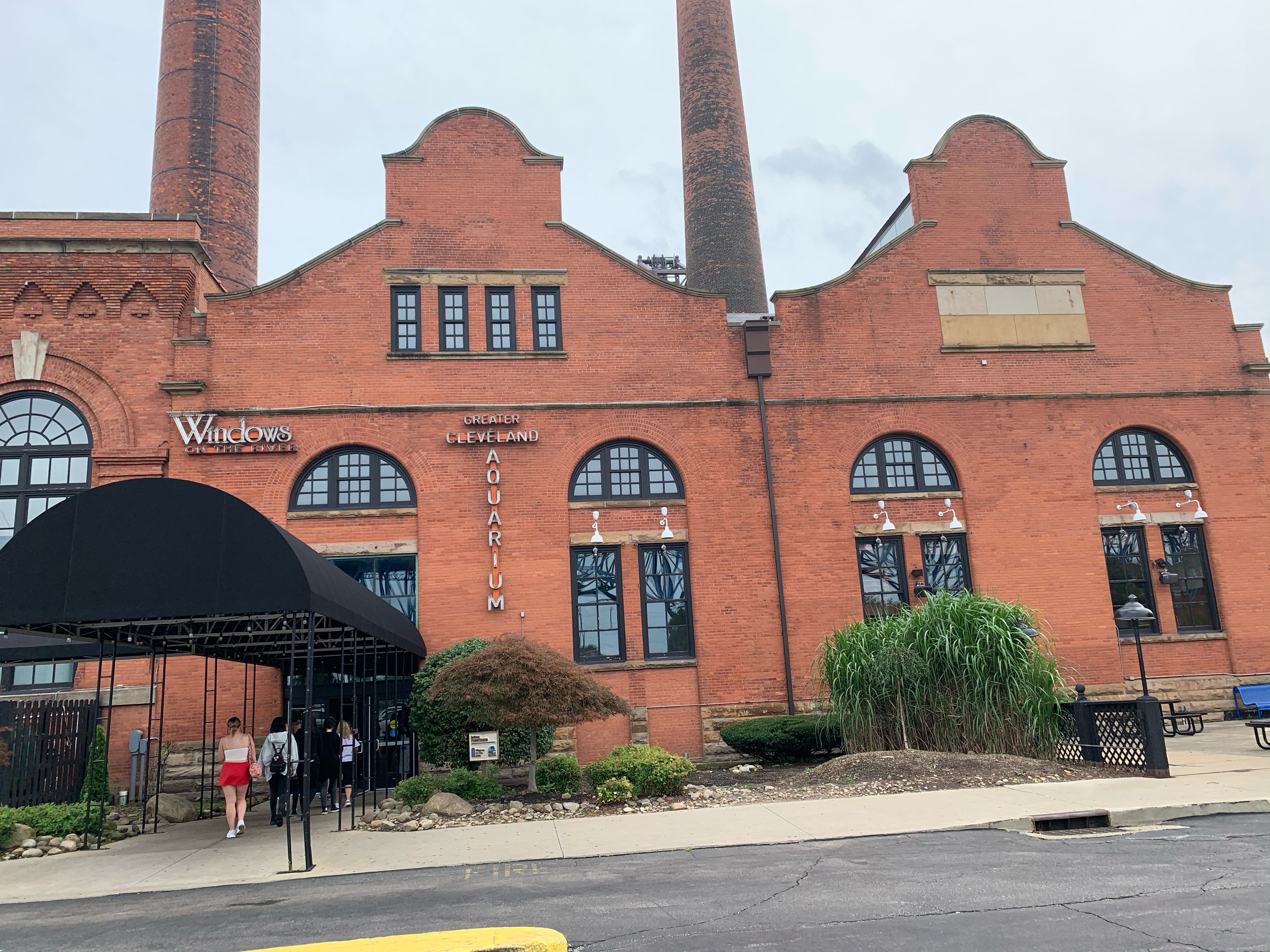
The First Energy Powerhouse Building - home to Windows on the River and the Greater Cleveland Aquarium

In September 2010, Cleveland Rowing Foundation closed a deal to reclaim 6.5 acres (2.6 ha) of vacant, industrialized land to create Rivergate Park, a public park devoted to rowing, canoeing, kayaking and dragon-boating.

The Greater Cleveland Aquarium opened its doors on Jan. 21, 2012 in the FirstEnergy Powerhouse on the West Bank of the Flats. The 70,000-square-foot building was constructed in the late 19th century to generate electricity for the city’s cable cars.

Plans were first unveiled in the summer of 2005 include leveling most of buildings in the East Bank and creating a new "neighborhood" that included mixed use live/work spaces, a movie theatre, shopping, a grocery store and riverwalk. The project was delayed by the 2007 Recession and court battles of property acquisition.

A multiphase, $500 million mixed-use redevelopment along the East Bank of the Flats is being developed and financed by the Wolstein Group and Fairmount Properties.

==== Phase I ====
Opening in June 2013, the $275 million first phase included a 23-story office tower, 8-story Aloft hotel, restaurants, and a 16,000 sq. ft. health club, The office tower has been named the "Ernst and Young building." The two anchor tenants include the law firm Tucker Ellis and West, and the largest tenant, Ernst and Young. The 450,000 sq. ft. office tower is all Class A office space and features a green, open-air rooftop terrace. The initial opening restaurants and bars included Ken Stewart's, Lago, Flip Side and Wileyville.

Two Waterfront Line Cleveland RTA stations, Settlers Landing station and Main Avenue station received $375,000 upgrades. Work at both stations includes replacing brick and concrete pavers, repairing the glass shelters, and demolishing ticket booths. At Settlers Landing, crews will restore eight etched glass panels that act as wind screens. The artwork depicts scenes of Cleveland's settlement and the evolution of transportation.

==== Phase II ====
2020s logo for the East Bank of The Flats entertainment district, following its redevelopment and revival

Several restaurants, bars, a 1200-foot boardwalk, and apartments opened as a part of Phase 2 in 2015. One of the biggest openings in Phase 2 was FWD, a seasonal open-air nightclub and dayclub inspired by Vegas and Miami venues. Developers for the Flats have been floating the idea of a seasonal dayclub since 2011.

By 2017, the Flats was once again vibrant and tourist friendly. New restaurants on the East bank, Cleveland Aquarium, a performance venue/bar on the West Bank, along with a piano bar, two breweries, a water taxi between the East Bank and the West Bank and many other upscale amenities have changed what was as recently as 2010 a ghost town.

Apartments above the tourist area rent in the $2000 range, and activity in the Flats might now be surpassing its former glory.

The canal's towpath, part of the Ohio and Erie Canal Corridor, is also being restored to provide jogging and bike trails for city residents and to preserve part of the Flats history. Whiskey Island has also been purchased by Cuyahoga County in hopes of making it more accessible to residents in the form of a lakefront park. The water quality of the river has also improved since 1970, with fish populations returning increasingly each year.

In 2017, Jimmy Buffett's Margaritaville opened on the East Bank of the Flats.

Another mixed use development, Thunderbird, was announced for Scranton Peninsula, in June, 2018.

In late 2021, radio station WKNR AM 850 moved its studios from the Galleria to a new location on the East Bank of The Flats.
