= South Harbor station =

Rapid transit station in Cleveland

South Harbor
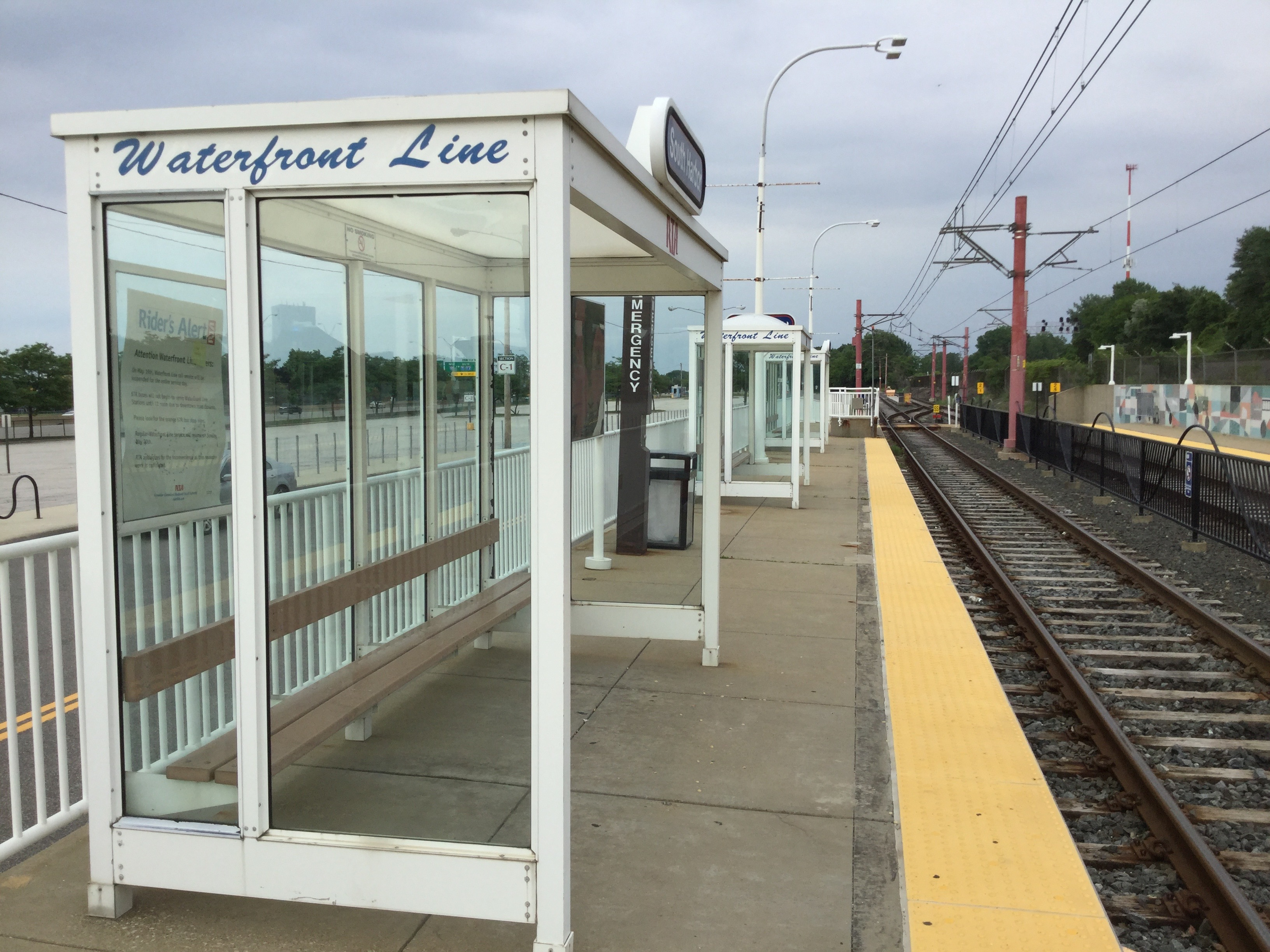
- The station as viewed from the eastbound platform

General information
- Location: 1300 South Marginal Road; Cleveland, Ohio
- Coordinates: 41°30′33″N 81°41′18″W
- Owner: City of Cleveland
- Operator: Greater Cleveland Regional Transit Authority
- Platforms: 2 side platforms
- Tracks: 2

Construction
- Structure type: At-grade
- Parking: Paid parking nearby
- Cycle facilities: Racks
- Accessible: Yes

Other information
- Status: Unstaffed
- Website: riderta.com/facilities/southharbor

History
- Opened: July 10, 1996; 30 years ago

Services
Preceding station	Rapid Transit	Following station
East 9th–North Coast toward Tower City	Waterfront Line	Terminus
Location

South Harbor station is a station on the RTA Waterfront Line in Cleveland, Ohio. It is the northern terminus of the Waterfront Line and the terminus of the Blue and Green Lines. The station is located in a rather isolated setting on the southeast side of the Lakefront Municipal Parking Lot (locally known as the "Muni Lot"), and is generally only useful to access the parking areas.

== History ==
The station opened on July 10, 1996, when light rail service was extended 2.2 miles from Tower City through The Flats and along the lakefront. This extension was designated the Waterfront Line, although it is actually an extension of the Blue and Green Lines, as trains leaving this station toward Tower City continue along the Blue or Green Line routes to Shaker Heights.

There have been several proposals to extend the Waterfront Line beyond South Harbor station since its completion in 1996. The proposal currently under consideration would extend the line southeast from through downtown past Playhouse Square and the Cuyahoga Community College main campus, where it would reconnect with the existing line in the vicinity of East 30th Street and the Main Post Office. The proposal is intended to improve downtown access to the rapid transit system and to “complete the loop” initiated by the Waterfront Line extension.

Another proposal, part of Cleveland's Lakefront Plan, is to extend the line east along the lakefront as far as East 88th Street and possibly out to Collinwood, where public and private sector development investments would be targeted.

== Notable places nearby ==
- Cleveland Municipal Parking

== Gallery ==
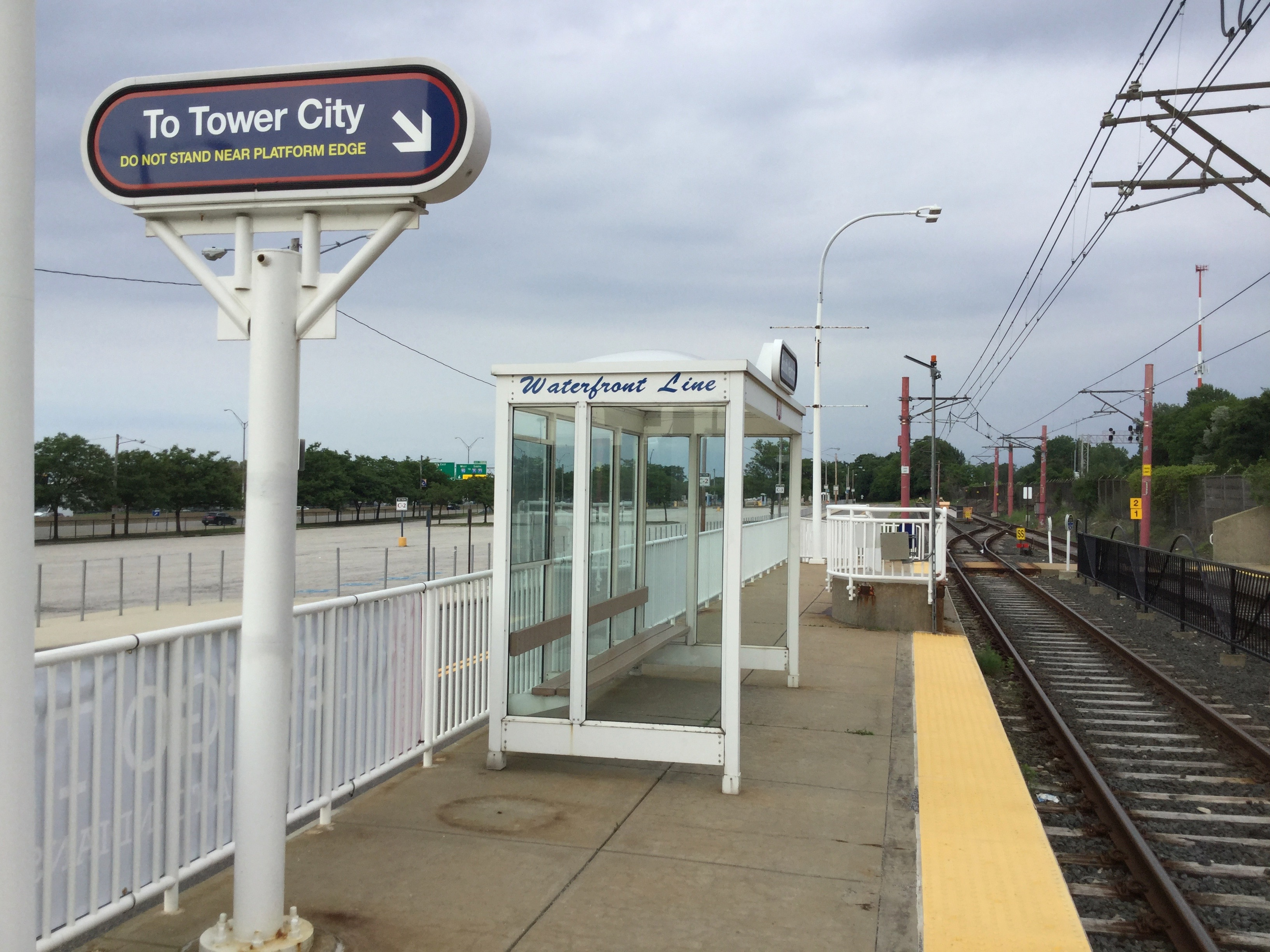

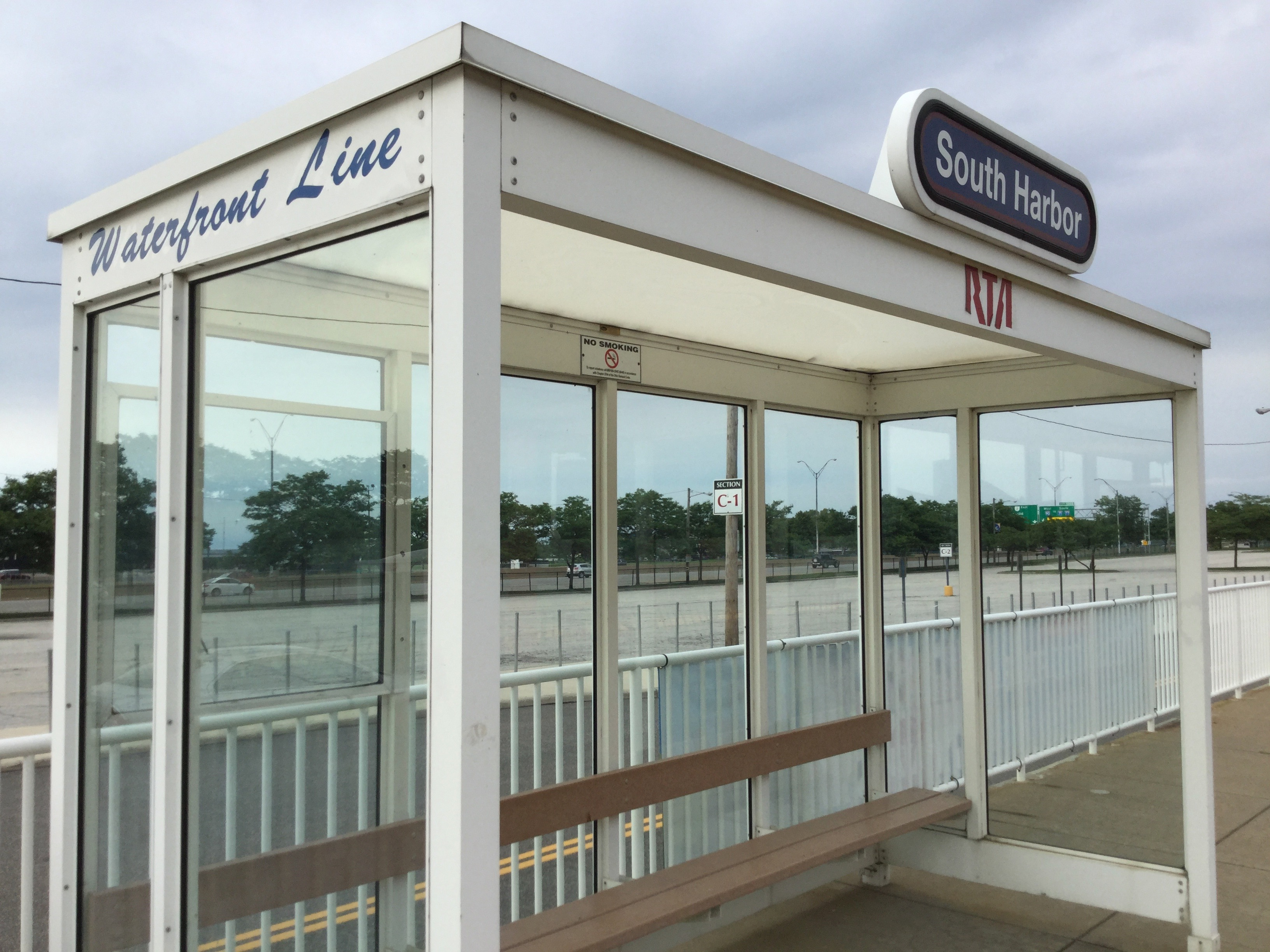

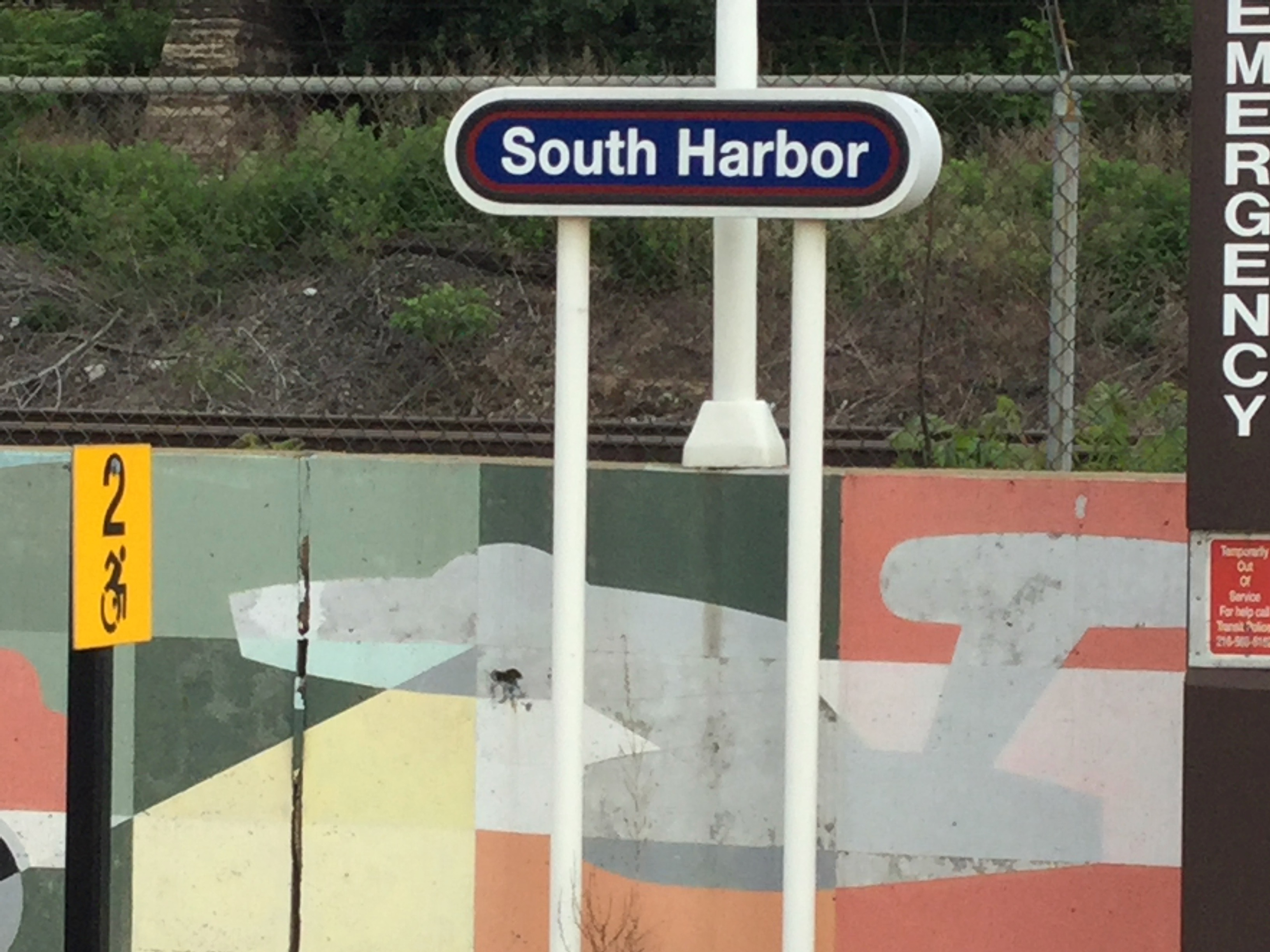

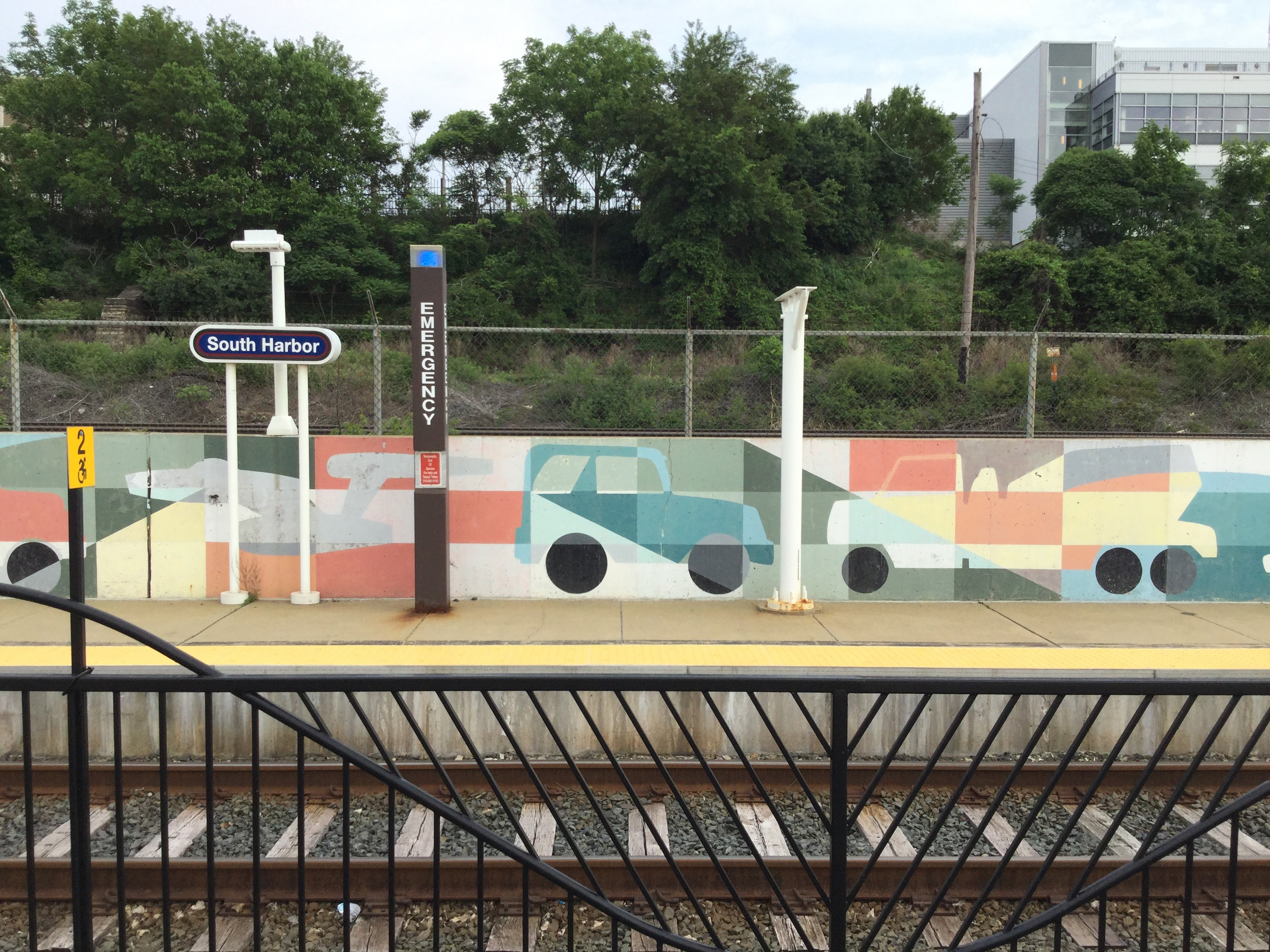

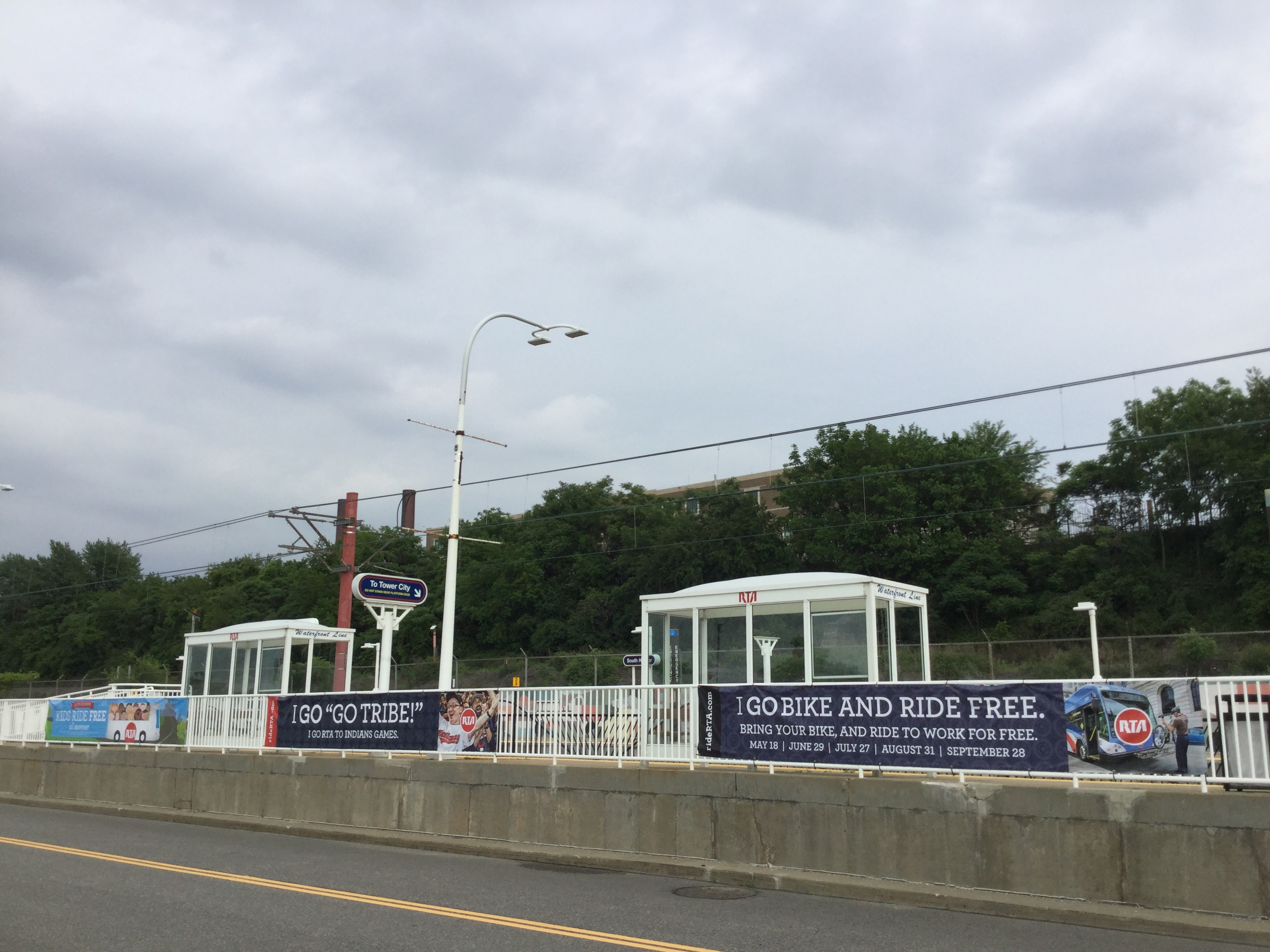

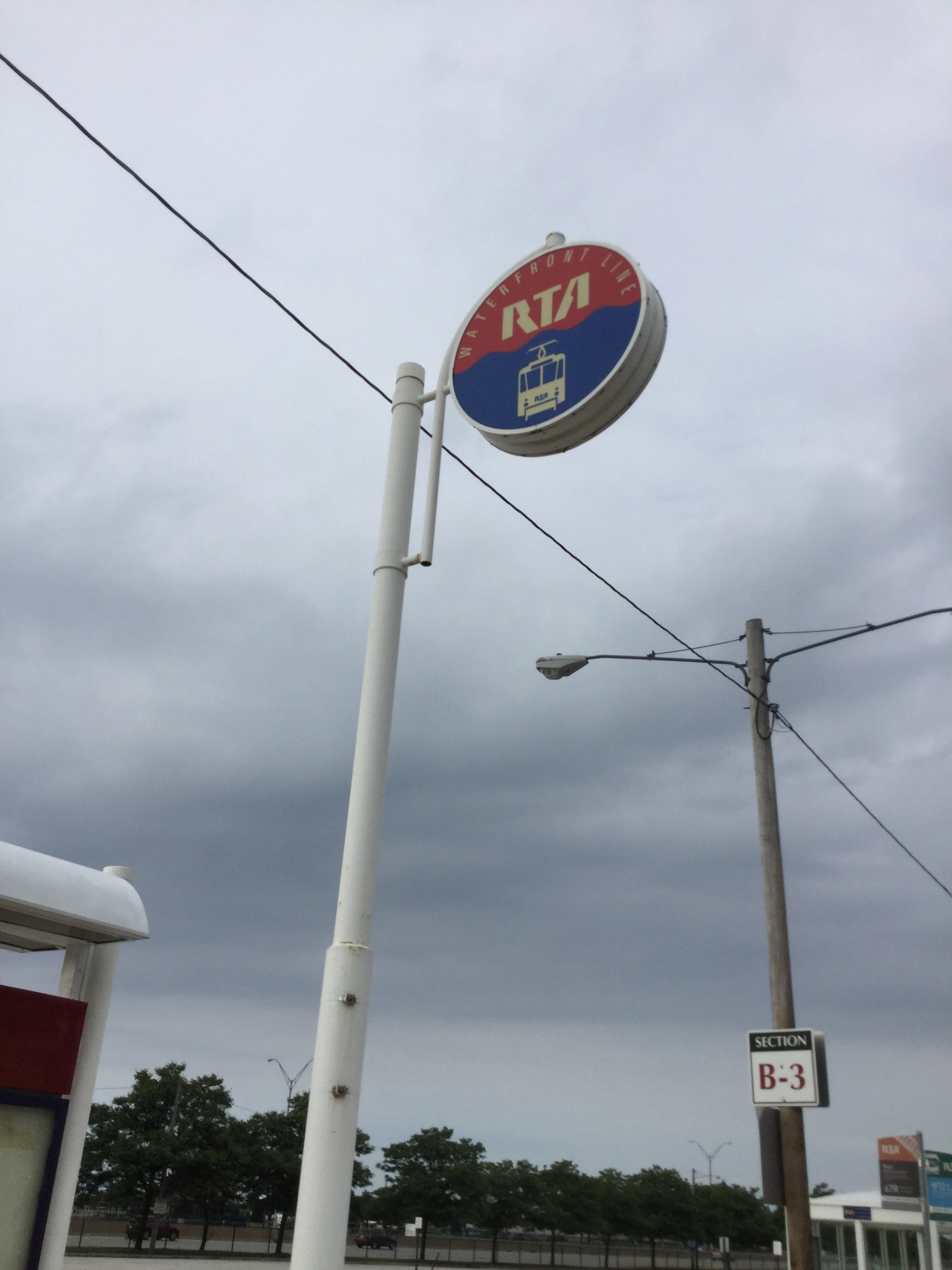
