= Union–Miles Park =

Neighborhood of Cleveland, Ohio, United States

- Neighborhood of Cleveland
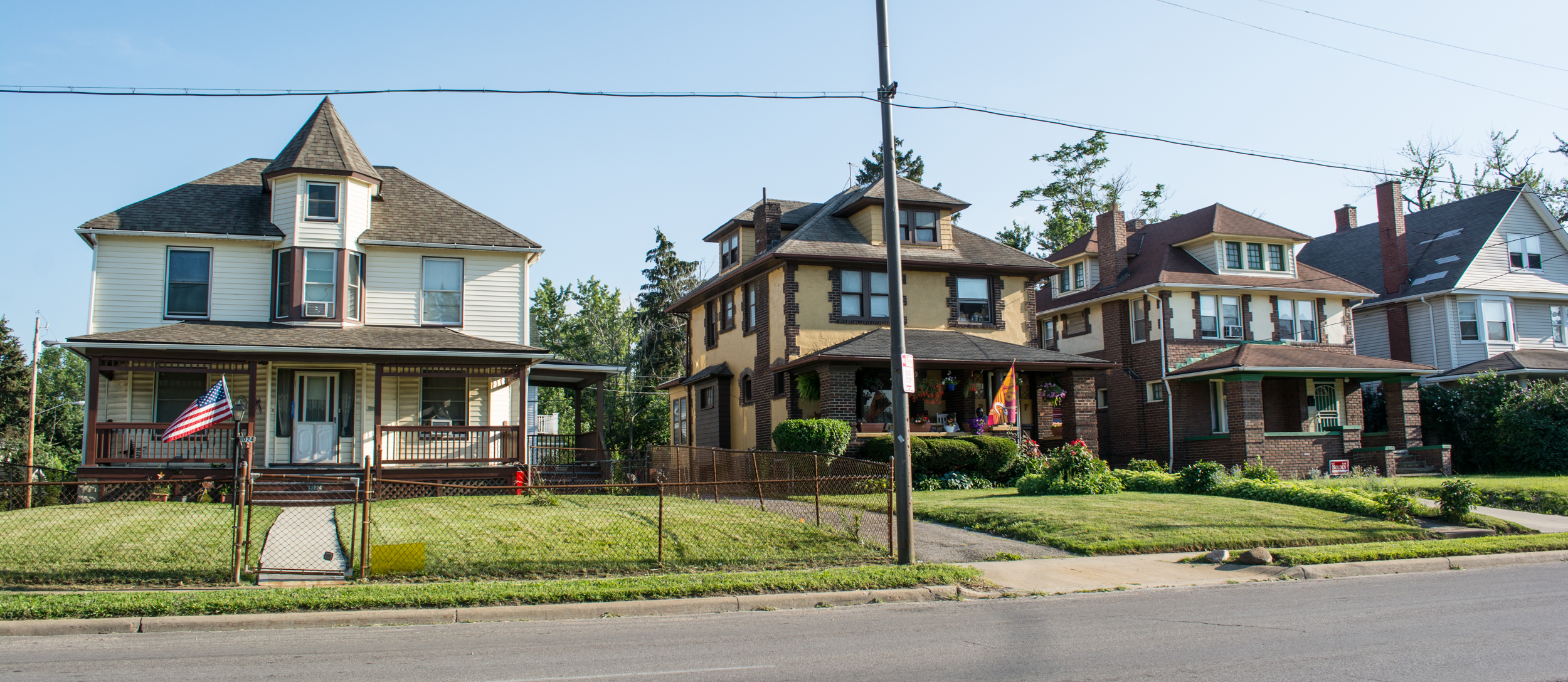
- Victorian style houses on Union Avenue

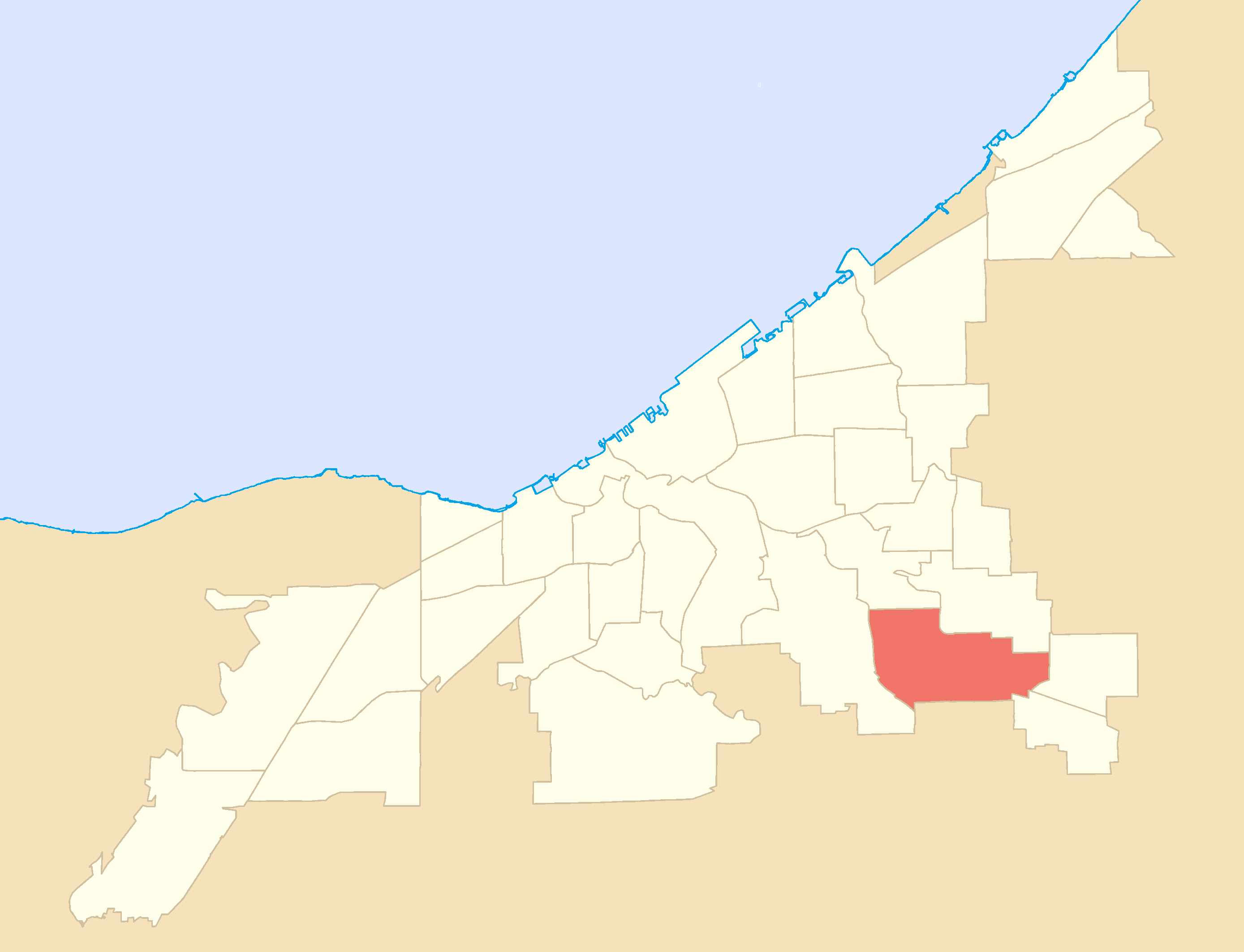
- Map of Cleveland, Ohio, showing neighborhood boundaries, with Union–Miles Park in red
- Coordinates: 41°27′17.6″N 81°36′51.8″W
- Country: United States
- State: Ohio
- County: Cuyahoga County
- City: Cleveland

Population (2020)
  - Total: 16,540

Demographics
  - White: 2.7%
  - Black: 95.6%
  - Hispanic (of any race): 1.2%
  - Asian and Pacific Islander: 0.1%
  - Mixed and Other: 1.6%
- Time zone: UTC-5 (EST)
  - Summer (DST): UTC-4 (EDT)
- ZIP Codes: 44104, 44105
- Area code: 216
- Median income: $26,315
- Source: 2020 U.S. Census, City Planning Commission of Cleveland

Union–Miles Park is a neighborhood on the Southeast side of Cleveland, Ohio, in the United States. The neighborhood draws its name from Union Avenue (which bifurcates the northern part of the neighborhood), and Miles Park in its far southwest corner (originally the town square of Newburgh Village).

Union–Miles Park was originally part of Newburgh Township, which was organized in 1814. Settled by whites as an area of farms and orchards, Union–Miles Park became one of two centers in the Cleveland steelmaking industry beginning in 1856. The steel mills drew Irish, Scottish, and Welsh immigrants to the area, with the intersection of E. 93rd Street and Union Avenue becoming known as "Irishtown". After an 1882 strike at the steel mill was broken using Polish and Slovak strikebreakers, the large Irish and Welsh communities were displaced by these two new immigrant groups. Railroads cut through many areas of Union–Miles Park, defining the area. The steel industry in Union–Miles Park collapsed during the Great Depression. White flight from the area in the 1960s, and a strong influx of African Americans eager to take advantage of inexpensive housing, radically changed the demographic nature of the neighborhood. Since the mid-1970s, Union–Miles Park has been challenged by a high poverty rate, low adult educational achievement, extensive decrepit and vacant housing, high crime, and a lack of employment opportunities.

Union–Miles Park is bordered on the west by Broadway–Slavic Village, the northwest by Kinsman, the north by Mount Pleasant, the east by the Lee–Miles area, and the south by the city of Garfield Heights, Ohio.

== Geography ==
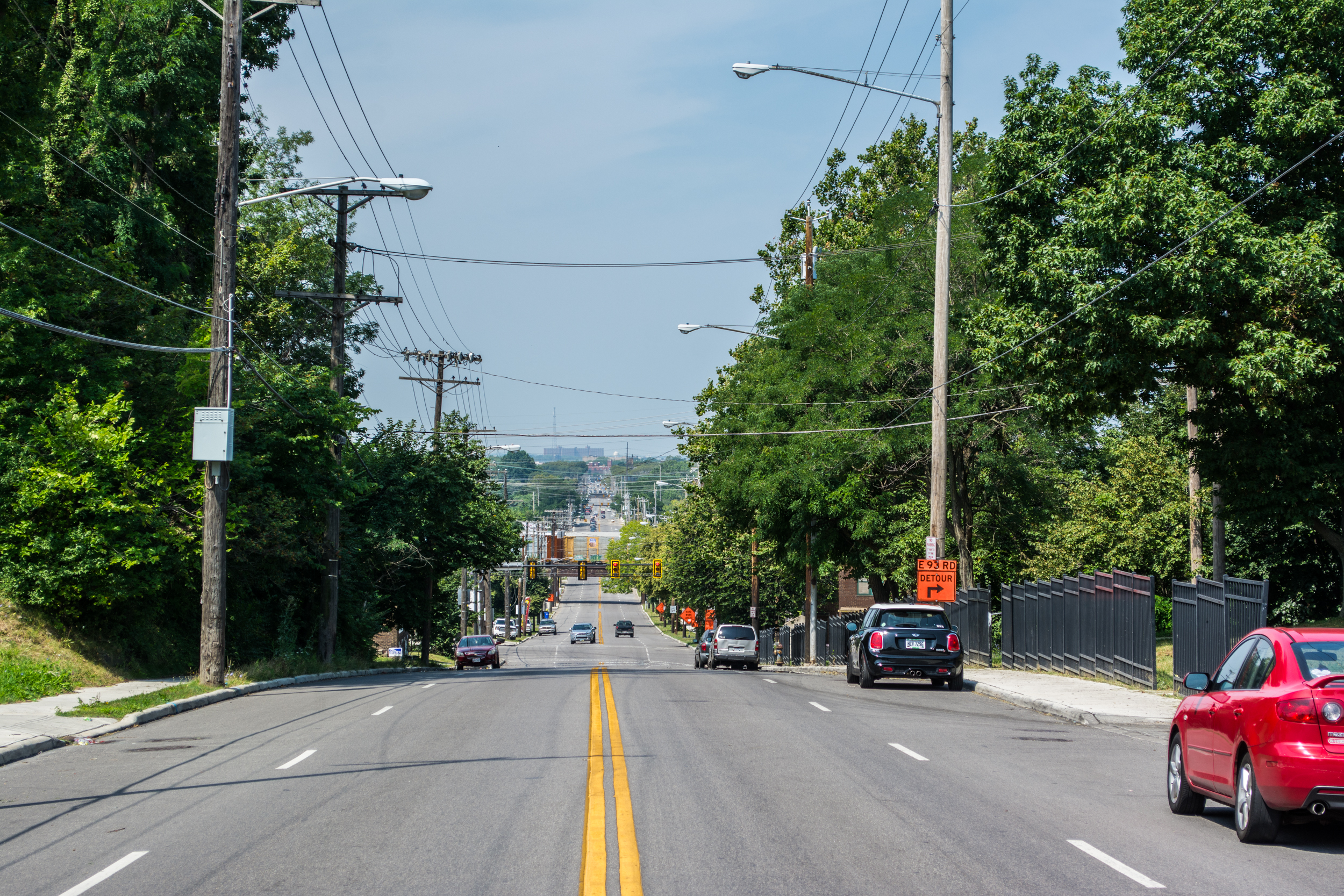
Looking east down Woodland Avenue. The Portage Escarpment rises a hundred feet above the Erie Plain, below.

Cuyahoga County is bifurcated along a northeast–southwest line into two distinct geographic areas. To the northwest of this line are the Till Plains of the Central Lowland physiographic section of the United States. To the southeast of this line is the Southern New York Section of the Appalachian Plateau. The Portage Escarpment forms the boundary line between these two geographic areas.

In what would become Newburgh Township, the Portage Escarpment acts as a moderately high bluff or ridge extending from Doan's Corners (located roughly at the modern intersection of Euclid Avenue and E. 105th Street) southwest, south, and southwest again to the old Newburgh Village. Northwest and west of the ridge, the terrain is relatively flat. It rises gradually in a series of sandy ancient beach ridges left by Lake Erie at a time when the lake was much larger than it is today. East and southeast of the ridge, glacial moraine covers the Allegheny Plateau as it rises gradually toward the Appalachian Plateau. This area is hilly, cut through by numerous dry ravines.

The western edge of Newburgh Township was bounded by the Cuyahoga River, whose valley lay 100 to 150 feet (30 to 46 m) below the surrounding land. In the north, Kingsbury Run acted as a natural border for many years between the city of Cleveland and Newburgh Township. To the south of Kingsbury Run, Burke Branch defined the route of Kinsman Avenue, and Morgan's Run that of Broadway Avenue. Mill Creek, a small tributary of the Cuyahoga River, formed the township's southern and southeastern boundary.

Union–Miles Park lies primarily east and southeast of the Portage Escarpment, with only the far southwestern part of the neighborhood on the Till Plains. Mill Creek helps define the area's southwestern border.

== Early history ==
=== Early human settlers ===
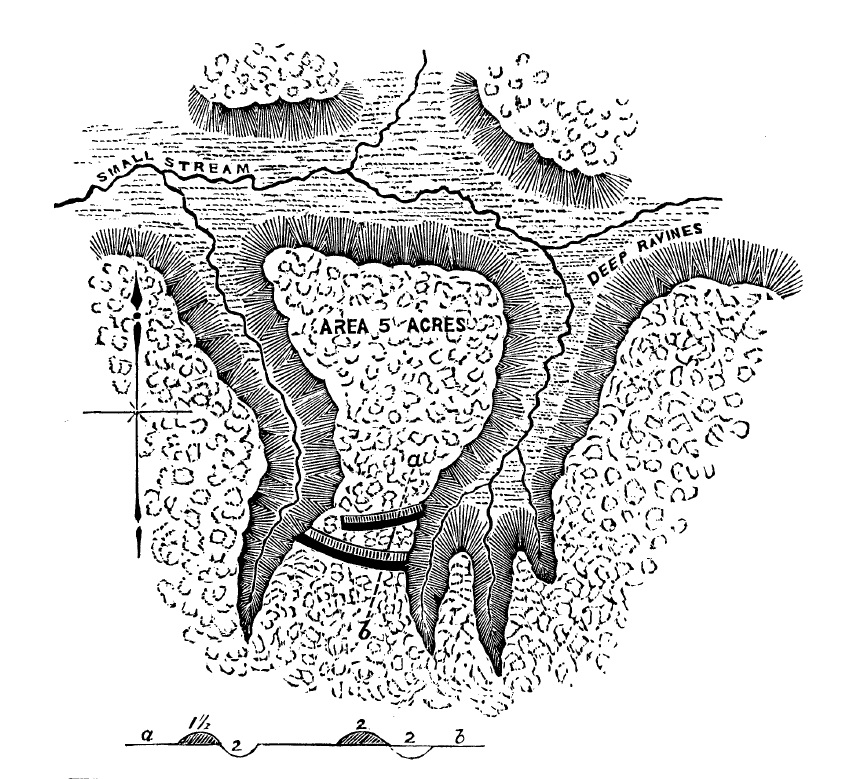
1867 drawing of a Woodland/Whittlesey encampment located near the intersection of Broadway Avenue and Aetna Road

Human beings first settled in northeast Ohio about 11,000 BCE, at the end of the Wisconsin Glaciation. The area, only recently uncovered by retreating glaciers, was initially tundra-like, but over time developed extensive evergreen forests. This highly nomadic hunting culture, known as Paleo-Indian, disappeared about 8,000 BCE, replaced by the nomadic hunter-gatherer Archaic culture. As the climate continued to warm, vast beech and maple forests (which continued to exist into the 19th century) supplanted the evergreens. About 2,500 BCE, this culture was in turn replaced by the semi-sedentary Woodland culture, which introduced ceramics and textiles to Ohio. The semi-permanent encampments of the Woodland people were usually atop high bluffs overlooking major river valleys, and consisted of low earthen walls and shallow ditches, which led early white settlers to mistakenly characterize them as "forts". Over time, these encampments were used for longer periods each year, and become more complex. Toward the end of the Woodland period, the Woodland people developed the bow and arrow. The more advanced culture of the Woodland people led to a major population increase in northeast Ohio.

A warming trend in the global climate about 800 CE created more agriculturally favorable weather in Ohio, which led to development of subsistence farming. A new society emerged, the Whittlesey culture (named for 19th century Ohio scientist Charles Whittlesey). (Note: The Whittlesey people disappeared before contact with Europeans. The names they gave themselves, and almost everything about them, remains unknown—except for what may be gleaned from archeological digs.) The semi-permanent blufftop settlements of the Woodland period became small- to medium-sized permanent villages. The Whittlesey engaged in the farming of beans, corn, and squash, and developed an extensive fishing tradition.

Between 1600 and 1650 CE, the Whittlesey people disappeared. The cause—absorption into another culture, disease, emigration, low birth rate, warfare, or some combination of factors—is not known. By the time the Iroquois of what is now central New York began moving along the shore of Lake Erie into northeast Ohio in 1650 during the Beaver Wars, the area was almost uninhabited. In the early and mid 1700s, the Mingo, (Note: The name "Mingo" is a corruption of the Algonquian language word "mingwe", which means "treacherous". Fleeing the Iroquois during the Beaver Wars, refugees from the Lenape (Delaware), Ouendat, Seneca, Shaawanwaki (Shawnee), and Susquehannock tribes merged to form a new tribal entity, the Mingo. They were joined in 1817 by some members of the Cayuga, who had sold their land in New York state.) Odawa (or Ottawa), and Ouendat (or Wyandot) occupied the area after fleeing the Iroquois. (Note: The Ouendat, also known as Wendat and Wyandot, consisted of several distinct but culturally and linguistically related tribes. Early French explorers called one group of Wendat tribes Huron, for their wild (heures, in French) hairstyles. Another group was called the Petun, French for "tobacco". Thus, the Petun were also known as the Tobacco Nation. Fleeing the Iroquois during the Beaver Wars, remnants of these two groups fled to the Ohio country and reunited under the name Ouendat/Wendat/Wyandot.) By 1800, Native American emigration out of the area was occurring again, and few indigenous people lived anywhere in Ohio by 1850.

At least two of the Woodland people "forts" still could be seen in Newburgh Township. One settlement was about 3 miles (4.8 km) southeast of the Cleveland city limits on Broadway Avenue, near the modern intersection of Broadway avenue and Aetna Road. The encampment stood on a small spit on dry land, protected on either side by deep ravines. The Woodland people had erected two parallel, low earthen walls across the neck of the spit. A 10 feet (3.0 m) high artificial mound existed near this "fort". The second "fort" was located near what is now the CanalWay Center of the Ohio & Erie Canal Reservation of the Cleveland Metroparks, and consisted of earthen walls approximately 6 feet (1.8 m) high, with a ditch in front of them.

=== Early history: White settlement prior to the establishment of Newburgh Township ===
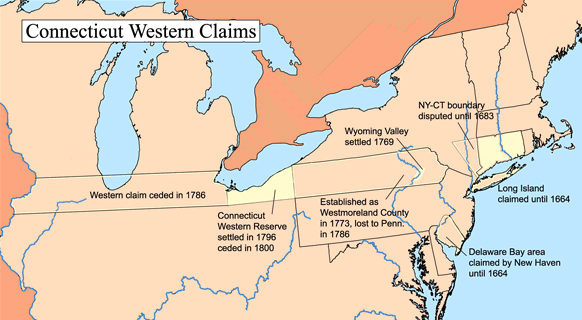
The Connecticut Western Reserve

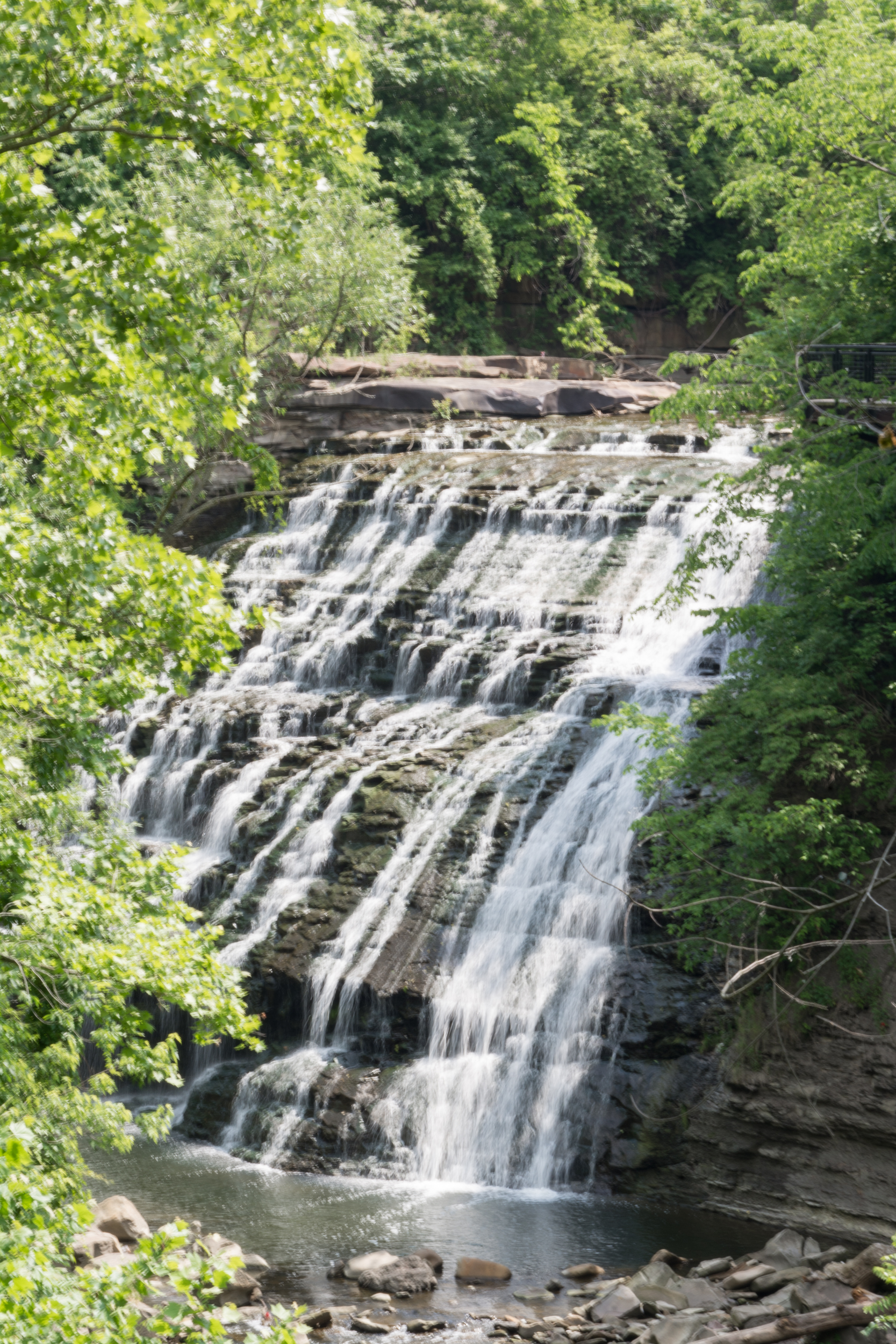
Modern Mill Creek Falls

In 1662, Charles II of England, ignoring existing Native American claims to the area, granted to the Connecticut Colony all lands west of the colony between the 41st and 42nd parallels of north latitude. These rights began at the western border of the Colony of Rhode Island and Providence Plantations and extended to the Pacific Ocean, although they did not include lands already ceded to the Province of New York or the Province of Pennsylvania. Charles and other English monarchs had also pledged these same lands to the Massachusetts Bay Colony, the province of New York, Plymouth Colony, and the Colony of Virginia. In 1786, Connecticut ceded all its land claims to the government of the United States in exchange for cancellation of its American Revolutionary War debts. Connecticut retained only those lands known as the Connecticut Western Reserve, an area bounded by Lake Erie on the north, Pennsylvania on the east, and the 41st parallel of north latitude on the south. The Western Reserve extended for exactly 120 miles (190 km) to the west, and came to an abrupt halt. (Note: Connecticut later abandoned its claim to 500,000 acres (2,000 km^{2}) of land on the western end of the Western Reserve, turning these areas over to certain coastal towns in the state as reparations for damages suffered during the Revolutionary War.) On August 3, 1795, the state of Connecticut sold the Western Reserve to the Connecticut Land Company for $1.2 million ($22,800,000 in 2025 dollars). Sales to potential settlers began immediately.

The first settlers in what would be Newburgh Township were David Bryant and his son, Whitman, who arrived in June 1797. East of the Portage Escarpment, they found dense forests of American sycamore, beech, black walnut, eastern hemlock, eastern redcedar, northern red oak, Ohio buckeye, shagbark hickory, sugar maple, and white oak. West of the escarpment were American elm, ash, beech, and black cherry. In some places, settlers would have seen artificial meadows, created by Native Americans using controlled fire. (Note: These meadows were used to clear land, which would attract game. Other burned areas would be used to drive game toward hunters.) On the flats which formed the valley of the Cuyahoga River bluegrass, white clover, and wild rye grew in profusion. American bison, eastern elk, and the extremely plentiful white-tailed deer were the most common game animals inhabiting the area. Canada geese, ducks, grouse, passenger pigeon, quail, and wild turkey were the most common game fowl.

In November 1799, Wheeler W. Williams and Ezra Wyatt constructed a gristmill at what is now Mill Creek Falls. In 1800, a sawmill was erected alongside the grist mill. Anticipating great growth in the area, in 1800 the 10 families which lived in Newburgh established the first burying ground in the township, the Axtell Street Cemetery, on 8 acres (32,000 m^{2}) at what is now E. 78th Street and Krueger Avenue (adjacent to the neighborhood's western boundary). (Note: Modern Krueger Avenue essentially bisects the cemetery grounds north–south. It was later known as the Eighteenth Ward Cemetery (after Newburgh was annexed by the city of Cleveland).) Many of Newburgh's pioneer families were buried in there, including the Ames, Burk, Edwards, Gaylord, Hamilton, Holly, Hubble, Jewett, Miles, Morgan, Hamilton, Quayle, and Wiggins families. Their faith in the township's grown proved correct. Although the mouth of the Cuyahoga River initially drew the most settlers, a great many of these families moved into the highlands of Newburgh Township after finding their original homesteads prone to malaria. Among the area's settlers was Charles Miles Sr., who moved to Newburgh from Hudson, Ohio, in 1805. The Miles family later became one of the most important in the township. The first educational opportunities for youth in Newburgh Township were private classes, which began to be offered about 1800. The first school open to the public (upon payment of tuition) was founded in 1802 near the intersection of Woodhill (now E. 93rd Street) and Kinsman Roads. (Note: Kinsman had been laid out in 1797 by Seth Pease, the original surveyor of Cleveland and the immediate area, and was initially called South Highway. Woodhill Road below Mt. Auburn Avenue has been renamed E. 93rd Street.) A second school followed at the intersection of Woodhill Road and Union Avenue a few years later.

A significant amount of road building occurred in the area just prior to and after the township's organization. By 1806, Newburgh Street (today's Woodhill Road and E. 93rd Street) had opened on the ridge between the grist mill and Doan's Corners. This area was now well-settled, with numerous farms and orchards alongside both sides of the road. (Note: One of these farms belonged to Allen Gaylord, a prominent Newburgher, who purchased a 50-acre (200,000 m^{2}) farm along Woodhill Road in 1809.) The Newburgh Road (today's Broadway Avenue below E. 34th Street; not to be confused with Newburgh Street) (Note: Maintenance of the road was taken over by the state of Ohio in 1822, and it was made a state road in 1830.) and Pittsburgh Street (today's Broadway Avenue above E. 34th Street) were constructed about the same time. (Note: It was widened between 1833 and 1835.) The Newburgh Road was the most heavily traveled road between Cleveland and Newburgh, made even more so by the opening of Ontario Street in 1812 (which connected Newburgh Road to Cleveland's Public Square). The Aurora Road (now Miles Avenue and Ohio State Route 43) opened about 1812 as well, although it was abandoned by 1820.

Newburgh Township was formally organized on October 15, 1814. (Note: Even at the time, the township's name was spelled with and without the letter "h". Either spelling is thus considered correct. This article includes the "h" for consistency's sake.) Its first law enforcement officer was one-legged, one-armed police constable Gaius Burke.

== Newburgh township and village ==
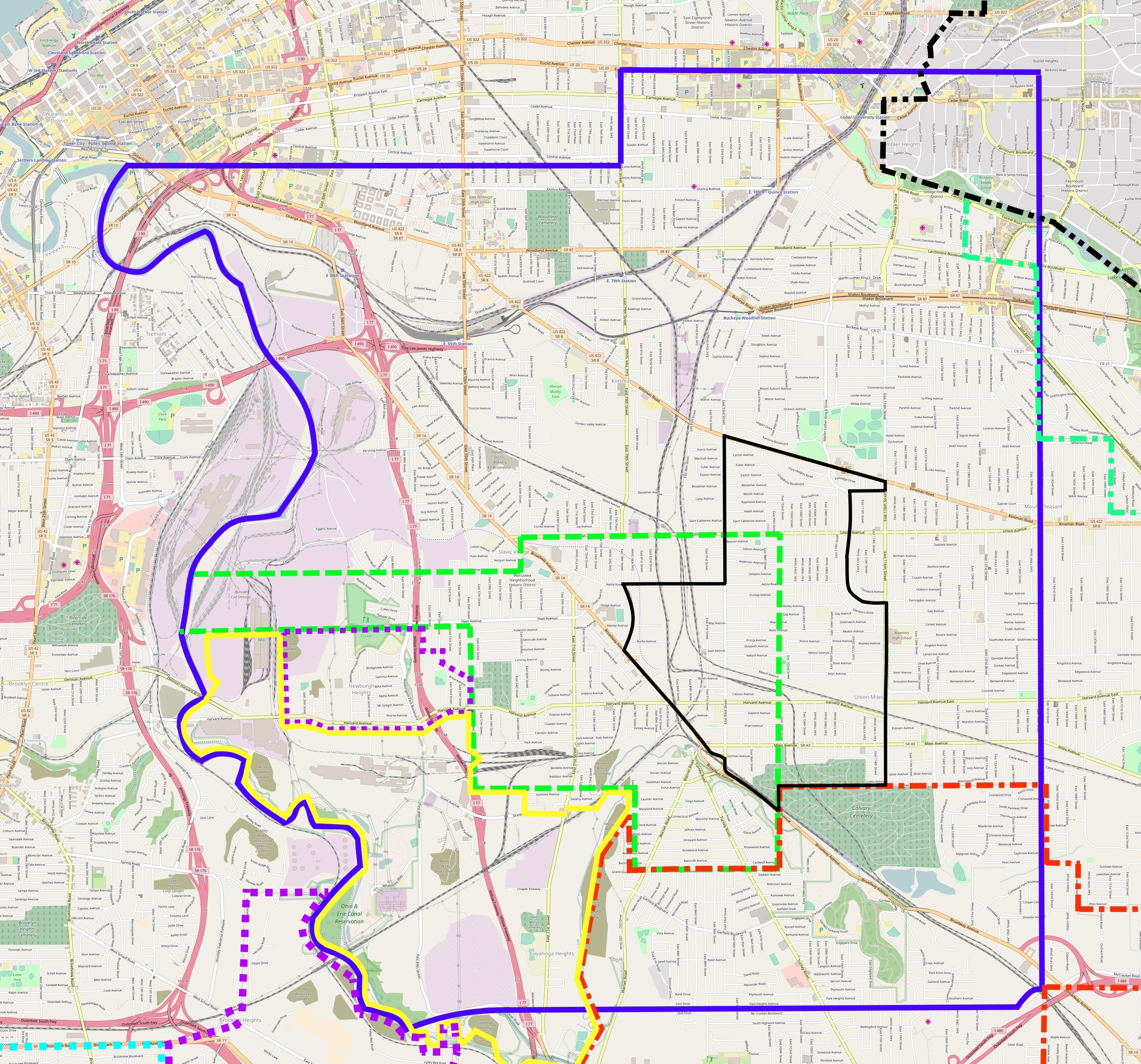
Newburgh Township (dark purple line), Union–Miles Park (black line), and other areas carved from the township.

=== Early Newburgh Township ===
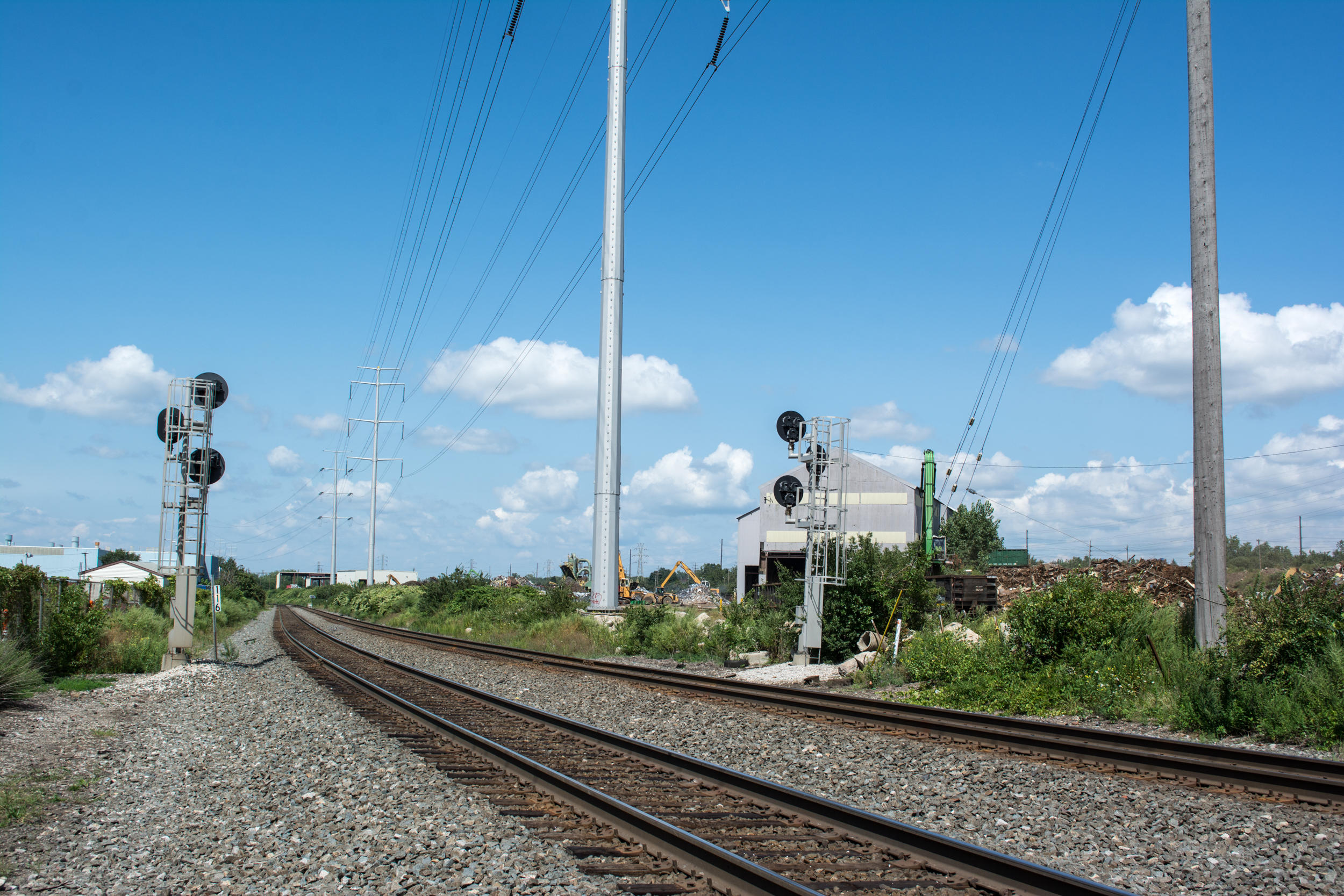
Cleveland & Pittsburgh Railroad tracks at Broadway Ave. and Jones Rd. in 2017.

For much of its early history, Newburgh Township rivaled Cleveland in size and importance. Newburgh was considered so much more important that it was more common for the public to say "Cleveland, the town six miles north of Newburgh" than the other way around. The neighborhood's first public school, later known as the Miles Park School, opened in 1818 near the corner of Miles and Broadway Avenues.

Newburgh Township's importance began to wane after 1826. Cleveland and Newburgh had both vied for the location of the U.S. federal courthouse in Cuyahoga County, but Cleveland won the battle—allowing that city to permanently eclipse Newburgh.

Newburgh Township continued to grow economically, if not in political or cultural importance. A significant concentration of homes had grown up northeast of the intersection of what is now Broadway Avenue and Miles Avenue, near Mill Creek Falls. This area became known as the Village of Newburgh. In 1828, a "town hall" was erected at what is now 9213 Miles Park Avenue, (Note: Miles Park Avenue was originally named Mechanic Street.) where it served as a township meeting hall, church, and school. The Newburgh Road was extended to Bedford, Ohio, in 1830; South Highway (Kinsman Avenue) was extended into the center of Cleveland (giving Newburgh access to downtown) in 1830; and Miles Road was repaired and reopened in 1833 as a state road (albeit only to Aurora, Ohio). The Newburgh Road was so important to the area's economic health that it was widened to 99 feet (30 m) from 66 feet (20 m) in 1834, and renamed Broadway. The area's population had also grown, and several churches were now formed in the township. These included the Miles Park Methodist Church (9105 Miles Park Avenue), (Note: This congregation initially worshipped at a home near the intersection of what is now Harvard Avenue and E. 71st Street. The estate of Theodore Miles donated a parcel of land on Miles Park Avenue in 1841, on which the first church structure was built in 1850 using donated wood. This building was demolished and the current brick structure erected. Church architectural historians Foster Armstrong, Richard Klein, and Cara Armstrong give the date of this structure's completion as "about 1870", while The Plain Dealer set its completion date as 1872 in a 1955 report.) and the Miles Park Presbyterian Church (9114 Miles Park Avenue) (Note: The congregation first met in a home located near the intersection of Woodhill Road (now E. 93rd Street) and Gorman Avenue. Its church on Miles Park Avenue was erected in 1872.) both founded in 1832, and the Disciples of Christ Church (later known as the Miles Avenue Church of Christ; 9200 Miles Avenue), founded in 1835. (Note: The Miles Avenue Church of Christ was erected about 1852.)

The widening of Broadway Avenue significantly improved the economic condition of the Village of Newburgh. By 1840, a carding mill, quarry, sawmill, and two taverns all clustered around what is now the intersection of Broadway and Miles Avenue. A brick-making factory opened shortly after 1840, and remained in operation until the late 1850s. One of the most important businesses in the Village of Newburgh opened in 1840 as well. Known as Cataract House, this three-story brick structure on the west side of Broadway Avenue consisted of a ballroom, meeting halls, and restaurant. It burned in 1852, and was rebuilt as a brick structure. Eagle House, constructed a few years later across the street on the east side of Broadway, offered similar amenities until 1853.

A second public school opened in Newburgh Township in 1843 on the northeast corner of what is now Union Avenue and E. 116th Street. Known as the Manx Street School, it served the growing Welsh immigrant population of the area. The building was replaced in 1871, and renamed the Mt. Pleasant School in 1913.

In 1847, the Cleveland and Pittsburgh Railroad (C&P) announced it would build its tracks through the heart of Newburgh Township. (Note: The company had been organized in 1836 as the Cleveland, Warren, and Pittsburgh Railroad. But no route was identified until the company was reorganized in March 1847 as the C&P.) The route opened in 1851. The railroad entered the township near E. 69th Street and Central Avenue, heading southeast to Holton Avenue. The tracks then ran south to the intersection of Harvard and Broadway Avenues, at which point they followed Broadway (crossing the street three times) until leaving the township. The railroad greatly improved the economic and social life of Newburgh.

=== Pre–Civil War Newburgh Village ===
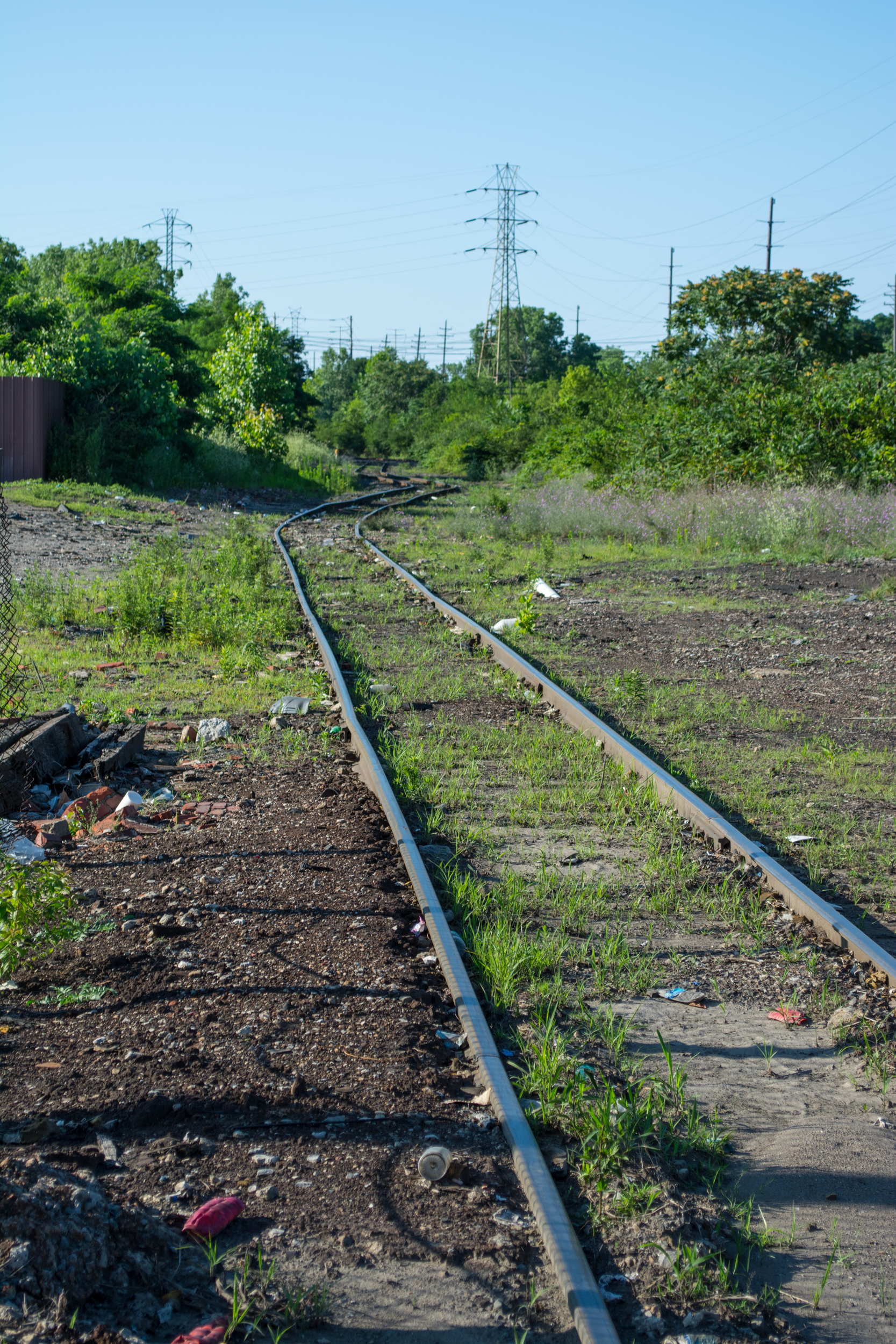
The tracks of the former Cleveland & Mahoning Valley Railroad at Aetna Road in the Union–Miles Park neighborhood in 2017.

In 1850, the United States Census showed that Newburgh Township was the fifth-most populous incorporated area in Cuyahoga County, with 1,542 residents living in 259 families in 246 dwellings. Only Cleveland (17,034), Brooklyn–Ohio City (6,275), East Cleveland (2,313), and Bedford (1,953) were larger population centers. The vast majority of workers in Newburgh Township were agricultural laborers, with a few individuals employed in ways that supported agriculture: blacksmiths, carpenters, shoemakers, and wagon makers. The agricultural economy of Newburgh Township was limited as most farms were small (no more than 100 acres (400,000 m^{2}) in size) and numerous dry ravines cut across the arable land. Most families engaged in subsistence farming. Non-agricultural businesses in the township were few in number. Although the Village of Newburgh added a tavern and a sawmill in the 1840s, it still had no hotel or boarding house. 1850 was the same year that Theodore Miles, son of an original pioneer settler of Newburgh Township, donated land east of Broadway Avenue, about equidistant between Harvard and Miles Avenues, for a village square. Cuyahoga County surveyor Ahaz Merchant platted a public square and village around this piece of property.

In 1852, the state of Ohio constructed the Northern Ohio Lunatic Asylum on what is now Turney Road between Warner Road and Vineyard Avenue, adjacent to the current neighborhood's western border. Later known as Newburgh State Hospital and still later as the Cleveland State Hospital, it burned to the ground in 1872, after which a larger, secure building was constructed. The grounds adjacent to Mill Creek were sold to the city to add to Garfield Park in 1896. The hospital, notoriously overcrowded and wracked by repeated abuse scandals, closed in 1975 and was demolished in the fall of 1994.

The Cleveland and Mahoning Valley Railroad (C&MV) began laying its tracks through Newburgh Township in 1853. The railroad began in a yard that stretched along the Old Ship Channel of the Cuyahoga River in the Ohio City neighborhood of Cleveland. It cut across the peninsula (paralleling Mulberry Avenue), then briefly ran along the Cuyahoga River. It cut overland to the southeast to avoid the Scranton Flats and Wheeling Bend, crossing the Cuyahoga just north of Kingsbury Run. The tracks then ran parallel to and east of Broadway Avenue, shifting to an east-southeast direction about E. 55th Street. After crossing the tracks of the Cleveland and Pittsburgh Railroad, the C&MV turned sharply southward. Before reaching Hamilton Avenue (now called Harvard Avenue), the tracks shifted southeast again, largely paralleling Harvard Avenue, Caine Avenue, and Miles Avenue before leaving the township.

In 1854, Union Avenue was constructed and planked from Broadway Avenue just south of E. 55th Street all the way east to Chagrin Falls (a distance of about 37 miles (60 km)).

== Union–Miles and the steel industry ==
=== Growth of the steel industry in Union–Miles ===
Throughout the 1850s, Newburgh Township's economy diversified rapidly. In 1857, Henry and Lemuel Pratt opened the Ohio Chair Factory at the corner of Broadway and Walker Avenues on the Union–Miles Park western boundary. Although the factory closed about 1872, the building remained for years, and in 1875 served as the temporary headquarters for the Eighteenth Ward's newly formed police district. By 1858, the Village of Newburgh boasted a boot and shoe store, dry goods and grocery store, hotel, physician, shingle manufacturer, and wagon maker.

The completion in 1856 of the Cleveland and Mahoning Valley Railroad provided the impetus for the establishment of the iron and steel industry in Newburgh by linking the mills to sources for raw materials, opening up regional markets for iron and steel, and for allowing Cleveland to serve as a transshipment center for iron ore to inland areas. That same year, the Grasselli Chemical Company opened on the Cuyahoga River (near the modern intersection of Broadway Avenue and E. 30th Street) to supply chemicals to the iron industry. Although Grasselli Chemicals was located outside the Union–Miles Park neighborhood, Czech and Polish immigrants, seeking work in the plant, began settling along Broadway Avenue nearby.

Steel became both Cleveland and Newburgh Township's biggest industry in the 1860s. (Note: The first iron foundry in the greater Cleveland area was founded in 1834. By 1837, there were four foundries, and by 1846 there were six. All of these were small and produced inferior-quality products, as they relied on the poor-quality iron ore found in Ohio. Cleveland's large port facilities first began accepting shipments of high-quality hematite ore from the Marquette Iron Range in 1856.) By 1870, Cleveland was the nation's second-largest producer of iron behind Pennsylvania, and by 1880 Cleveland's economy was overwhelmingly dominated by the iron and steel industry. Steel rapidly boosted the greater Cleveland area's population so that by 1890 Cleveland was the tenth-largest city in the nation. As late as 1920, steel was still the most important industry in Ohio, and Cleveland remained the Ohio steel industry's most important center. Cleveland was not only a national center for steel production, but because of steel it also became a major shipbuilding and automobile production hub. The city became the second-largest automobile manufacturing center in the nation (only Detroit was larger), because of its ready access to steel.

Along with the Cleveland Flats along the Cuyahoga River, Union–Miles Park was one of two great steel-making centers in Cleveland. The Cleveland Rolling Mill in Newburgh Township was Cleveland's most important manufacturer by 1879, and six years later, the company was the largest iron and steel manufacturer in Cleveland and one of the five largest steel firms west of Pennsylvania.

=== Formation and growth of Cleveland Rolling Mill ===
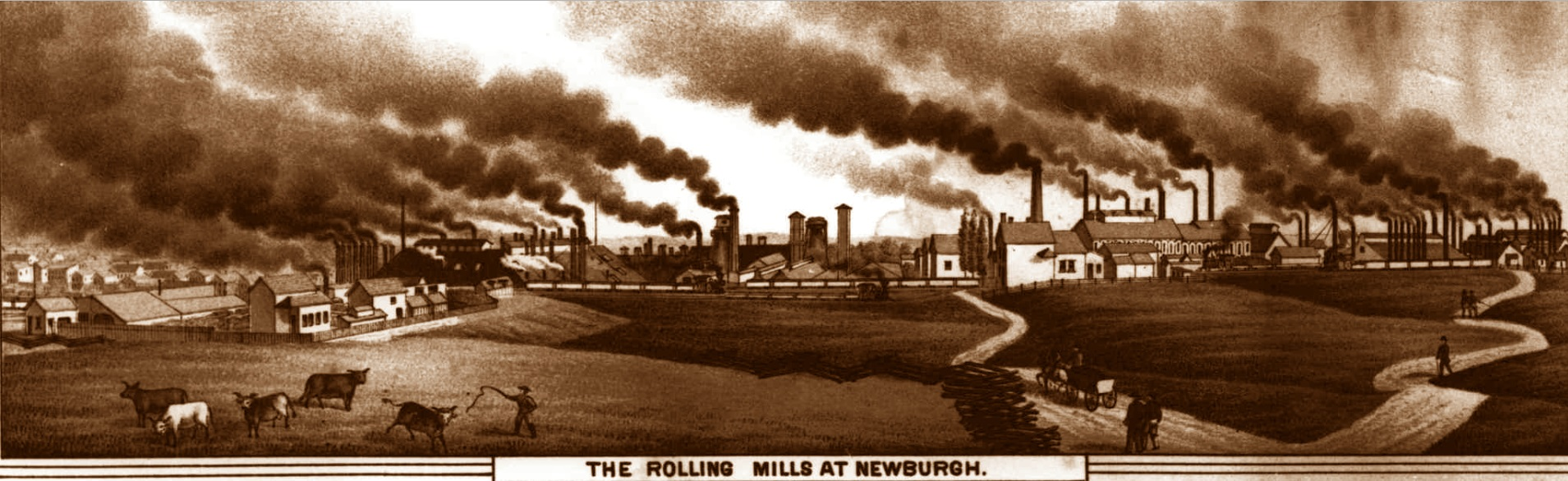
Drawing depicting the Cleveland Rolling Mill's Newburgh Works in 1885.

1856 saw the establishment of Union–Miles Park's (and Cleveland's) most important manufacturer, Cleveland Rolling Mill. The firm was established by brothers and Welsh immigrants David and John Jones in lot 456 to manufacture flat bottomed railway rails. The brothers ran out of money that same year, and shut down. Scottish immigrants Henry and William Chisholm made a major investment in the Jones plant in 1857, and the company was renamed Chisholm, Jones and Co. (Note: Sources differ as to the new name. One source says the name was Chisholm & Jones.) The plant was expanded and began rerolling iron flanged railway rails into flat bottomed rails. In 1860, Amasa Stone and his brother, Andros, made a further investment in the company, which took the name Stone, Chisholm & Jones. The new capital enabled to firm to add a blast furnace and puddling plant, which opened in 1859. A second blast furnace was added in 1860. It was the first blast furnace to operate in the Cleveland region. The plant had grown so swiftly that it now employed about 150 workers and produced 50 short tons (45 t) of iron railroad ties daily.

On November 9, 1862, Stone, Chisholm & Jones reorganized and became the Cleveland Rolling Mill after receiving investments from Henry B. Payne, Jeptha Wade, and Stillman Witt. The company built a 60-foot (18 m) high, 16-foot (4.9 m) wide blast furnace in 1864 near the west end of what is now Saxe Avenue, and the following year erected its first Bessemer converter. This made the Cleveland Rolling Mill only the second Bessemer steel works in the United States.

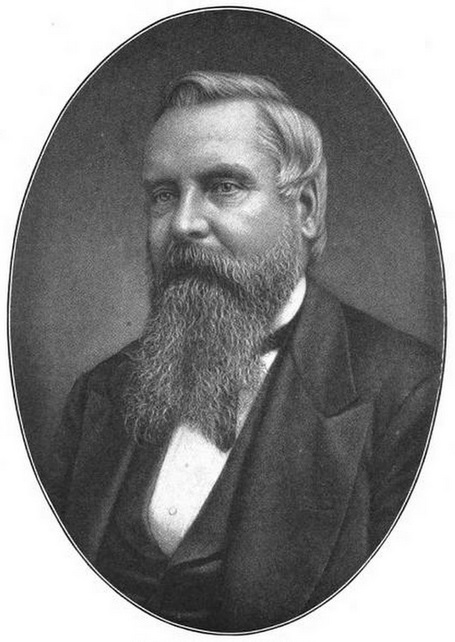
Henry Chisholm, the driving force behind Cleveland Rolling Mill.

Cleveland Rolling Mill expanded its presence in 1868 with the construction of the Newburgh Steel Works (Note: Sometimes spelled "Newburg Works".) next to its existing plant. The new works included an open hearth Bessemer furnace; it was the first continuous open hearth Bessemer furnace west of the Allegheny Mountains and only the fifth such furnace in the nation. A 50-short-ton (45 t) stationary blast furnace and four 50-short-ton (45 t) rolling open hearth furnaces were also built. (Note: The rolling open hearth furnace was invented by Cleveland engineer Samuel T. Wellman. Instead of being stationary, the furnace was on a set of rockers ("rollers"). Water-cooled hydraulic arms at the front and back of the furnace allowed it to tip forward, pouring the molten steel into a forehearth (a temporary holding tank which prevents the metal from being exposed to air) or directly into molds. This avoided the use of a ladle. The rolling furnace helped prevent partially melted metal from collecting on the bottom of the furnace, and was longer-lasting since it did not need to be pierced in order for the molten steel to be tapped. It should not be confused with the rolling mill.) A boiler plate mill, sheet metal mill, and wire mill were in operation by 1870. Another 60-foot (18 m) high, 16-foot (4.9 m) wide blast furnace was erected in 1872. By the end of 1872, the combined Newburgh plants had two puddling mills; two blast furnaces; two Bessemer converters; a boiler plate mill; two rail and rod mills; a wire mill; and a bolt, nut, and spike manufacturing shop. The Newburgh plants were producing so much pig iron, cast iron, and steel that Cleveland Rolling Mill became one of the principal metalworks in the state. A second open hearth furnace was constructed in 1876, and the company leased the works and the Proton Furnace of the Cleveland Iron Co. in 1878. Cleveland Rolling Mill built a 70-foot (21 m) high, 17-foot (5.2 m) wide blast furnace at the leased site a year later, by which time Cleveland Rolling Mill occupied 32 acres (130,000 m^{2}) of the Union–Miles Park neighborhood. (Note: Although the Cleveland Iron Co. works could produce 40,000 short tons (36,000 t) of rails and bar a year, Cleveland Rolling Mill barely used the plant. It merely wanted the Proton Furnace.)

Cleveland Rolling Mill continued to expand in the last two decades of the century. In April 1880, the firm issued new stock to double its capitalization, purchased the "Canal Tract" from John D. Rockefeller, (Note: This tract (of uncertain original acreage) occupied the east bank of the Cuyahoga River and was bounded by Wheeling Bend of the river on the north, the Jefferson Avenue bridge on the south, and the tracks of the Cleveland & Mahoning Valley Railroad to the east.) built the Central Furnaces on the site from 1881 to 1882 A blooming mill was built on the Newburgh site in 1881, and a third blast furnace in 1882. 1882 also saw the erection of a Garrett rod mill, the first of its kind anywhere in the world. (Note: William Garrett, an engineer with the company, had developed a rod manufacturing process which quintupled productivity.) Construction of the Central Furnaces enabled the company to dismantle two of the older furnaces at Newburgh in 1884. Another blooming mill was erected at Newburgh in 1901, another blast furnace in 1901, and a rod mill in 1902.

Cleveland Rolling Mill was acquired by the American Steel and Wire Company of New Jersey in 1899. By that time, the company's works stretched from E. 91st Street in the east to E. 78th Street in the west, and from Harvard Avenue in the south north to Aetna Road. A second, smaller works occupied an area a half-mile to the west, bounded by Broadway Avenue, Fleet Avenue, and Aetna Road. Cleveland Rolling Mill occupied a total of 75 acres (300,000 m^{2}) in what would become the Union–Miles Park neighborhood, and 4,000 workers were employed there.

=== Other steel companies ===
By 1859, several other metal manufacturing plants had been built in Newburgh Township near rail lines. Most of these merely rerolled rails, but after some years many of these plants began manufacturing finished iron as well as steel. Another 21 iron and steel mills were established in the area between 1860 and 1866. Among the more important companies were:

- The Cleveland Wire Mill Company, established in February 1867. Its works were built adjacent to the neighborhood's western border where Wire Avenue met the Cleveland & Pittsburgh Railroad tracks. The only mill of its kind in northern Ohio when it was built, it proved so successful that it doubled in size within a year. This mill was also the largest of its kind in the country, and capable of manufacturing an extremely wide range of product. Cleveland Rolling Mill purchased the works of the Cleveland Wire Mill Company in 1868 or 1869. Cleveland Rolling Mill expanded the plant beginning in 1896, adding a rod mill with two small blast furnaces and a continuous rod mill with one small blast furnace.
- The Aetna Iron and Nail Company, established in June 1867. It works were built adjacent to the neighborhood's western border on land owned by the Union Iron Works (at what is now the intersection of Aetna Road and E. 82nd Street). The southern edge of the works abutted the Axtell Street Cemetery. (Note: When the firm's founder, James Loveday, allegedly embezzled $8,000 ($200,000 in 2025 dollars) from the firm in August 1869, it collapsed. The company was then purchased by Cleveland Rolling Mill and later became part of Republic Steel.)
- The American Sheet and Boiler Plate Company, established in 1868. Its works were constructed just north of the Cleveland Rolling Mill's works (at what is now Aetna Road, between the Cleveland & Pittsburgh and the Cleveland & Mahoning Valley railroad tracks).
- The Cleveland Iron Co., established in 1869. Its works were constructed between the Cleveland Rolling Mill works and the American Boiler Plate works at Carter Avenue (now Cambridge Street). The company plant included the 60-foot (18 m) high, 16-foot (4.9 m) wide Proton Furnace. Cleveland Rolling Mill leased the company and its works beginning in 1878.
- The Union Iron Works, (Note: Also known as the Union Iron Works Company.) established in 1869. Its works were built adjacent to the neighborhood's western border just north of Union Avenue (at what is now the northeast corner of the intersection of Union Avenue and E. 78th Street). Founder Samuel Augustus Fuller established the mill to roll railway rails. Henry Chisholm purchased the company in 1871 and combined it with the Aetna works two blocks to the south to produce steel using the Bessemer process. The firm built the Emma Furnace in 1872, a massive and famous blast furnace named for Emma Paton (daughter of David Jones and wife of Aetna Iron co-founded James Paton). Additional, smaller furnaces were constructed in 1875. Fuller bought the mills back in 1880 and formed the Union Rolling Mill Co. Chisholm spun off the Emma Furnace under the ownership of the Newburg Furnace Co. in January 1882, and it was purchased by the Union Rolling Mill Co. in August 1883. By 1893, the Union Rolling Mill Co. employed 400 workers on 7 acres (28,000 m^{2}) of land.
- The Gartland Foundry, founded in February 1893. Its works were located on Echo Street between E. 71st and E. 72nd, just outside the Union–Miles Park western boundary. The firm was so successful that it doubled the size of its plant in 1899.

=== Consolidation in the Union–Miles Park steel industry ===
In April 1898, Cleveland Rolling Mills joined with 13 other nail, rod, and wire manufacturing companies to form the American Steel and Wire Company of New Jersey. Cleveland Rolling Mill furnished steel for its own mills and three other wire and nail mills in the region.

In 1901, American Steel and Wire merged with American Sheet Steel Company, American Steel Hoop Company, American Tin Plate Company, Carnegie Steel Company, Federal Steel Company, National Steel Company, and National Tube Company to form U.S. Steel. The merger left U.S. Steel in control of nearly all the wire and nail companies in the nation.

=== Changes wrought by the steel industry ===
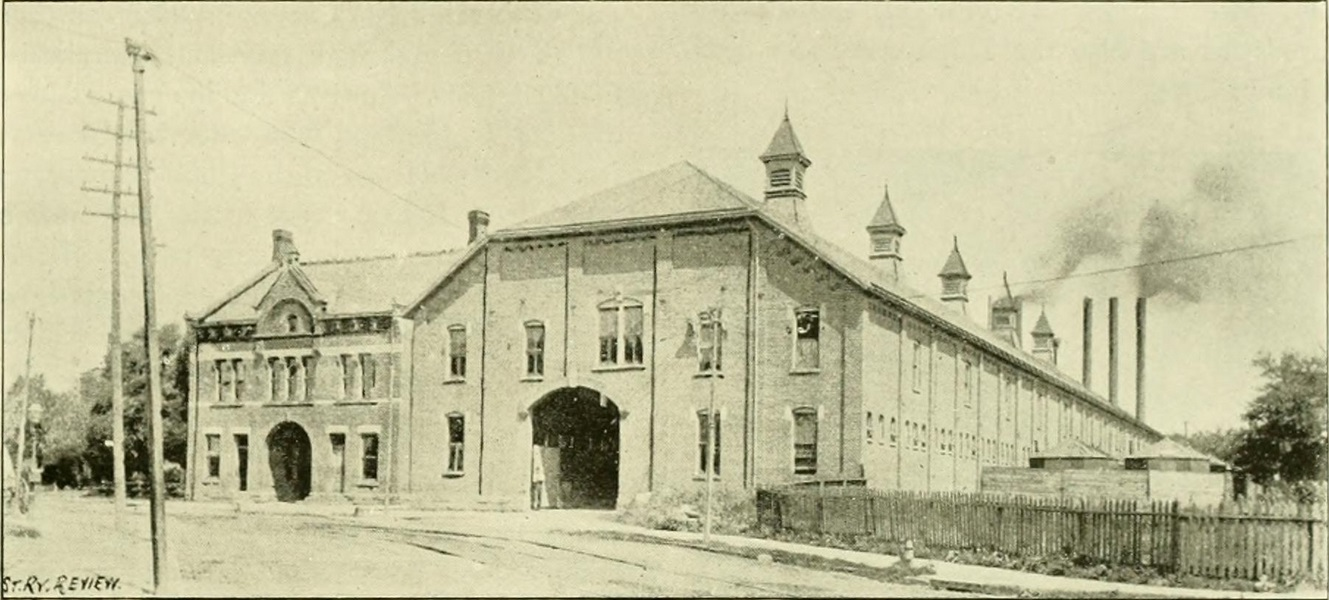
Broadway and Newburg Street Railway powerhouse at Broadway Avenue and Aetna Road

The Union–Miles Park iron and steel mills—and the associated factories which turned these products into bolts, machinery, nails, plate, rods, tools, and other items—were largely concentrated in the central and western sections of the neighborhood.

The emergence of the steel industry encouraged a large number of Irish, Welsh, and, to a much lesser extent, Scottish immigrants to move to the area to work in the mills. (Note: For example, there were just 25 Welsh people living in Newburgh Township in 1857, but by 1870 there were more than 2,000.) Most of the Irish and Welsh workers settled around the intersection of Broadway Avenue and Jones Road, just north of Harvard Avenue. (Note: Irish immigrants first came to Ohio in 1825 to build the Ohio and Erie Canal. Most of these individuals settled on the west bank of the Cuyahoga River near the river's mouth, finding employment as dock workers after the construction of the canal ended.) Another Irish community formed on Gaylord Avenue southeast of the Cleveland Rolling Mill, which led people to refer to this part of Union–Miles Park as Irishtown. Nearly all of the Irish and Welsh workers were unskilled, low-paid employees.

As the iron and steel industry in the area expanded, and more immigrant workers moved into the area, small houses on lots set close together proliferated. Employers and developers began to build worker housing against iron and steel plant boundaries so that their employees could walk to work.

To provide these workers with access to the downtown retail area, the Broadway Street Railway opened in 1863. This was a horse-drawn omnibus guided by metal rails ran down Broadway Avenue from Public Square to the Village of Newburgh twice a day. The Broadway & Newburgh Street Railway's omnibus line opened in 1873, running from the Kinsman Street Railway at the intersection of Woodland Avenue and E. 55th Street south to Broadway Avenue, and then down Broadway to E. 110th Street. (Note: The horse-drawn Kinsman Street Railway began operation in 1859, running from W. 9th Street and Superior Avenue down Superior, Ontario, and Orange avenues to reach its eastern terminus at Woodland and E. 55th Street.) A third omnibus line, the Brooklyn Street Railway, began operating in 1883 from Public Square. It traveled south on Ontario Street and Orange Avenue to Woodland Avenue, and then east on Woodland Avenue to Woodland Cemetery. One year later, it extended its line south from Woodland Avenue along E. 55th Street to Broadway (paralleling the Broadway & Newburgh Street Railway). Between 1884 and 1894, all non-cable street railways in Cleveland had converted to electricity. The Brooklyn Street Railway built a powerhouse at the intersection of Broadway Avenue and Aetna Road. In 1893, the company, now part of the Cleveland Electric Railway Company, began construction of a spur on Miles Avenue from Broadway to E. 131st Street. A loop, beginning at Broadway and Union Avenue, traveled east on Union to E. 93rd Street, south to Harvard Street, and back to Broadway. Despite the extensive public transit system, the proximity of working housing to the steel mills meant that 60 percent of workers in 1920 in the Union–Miles Park neighborhood still walked to work daily, a much higher percentage than in any other industrial city in the nation.

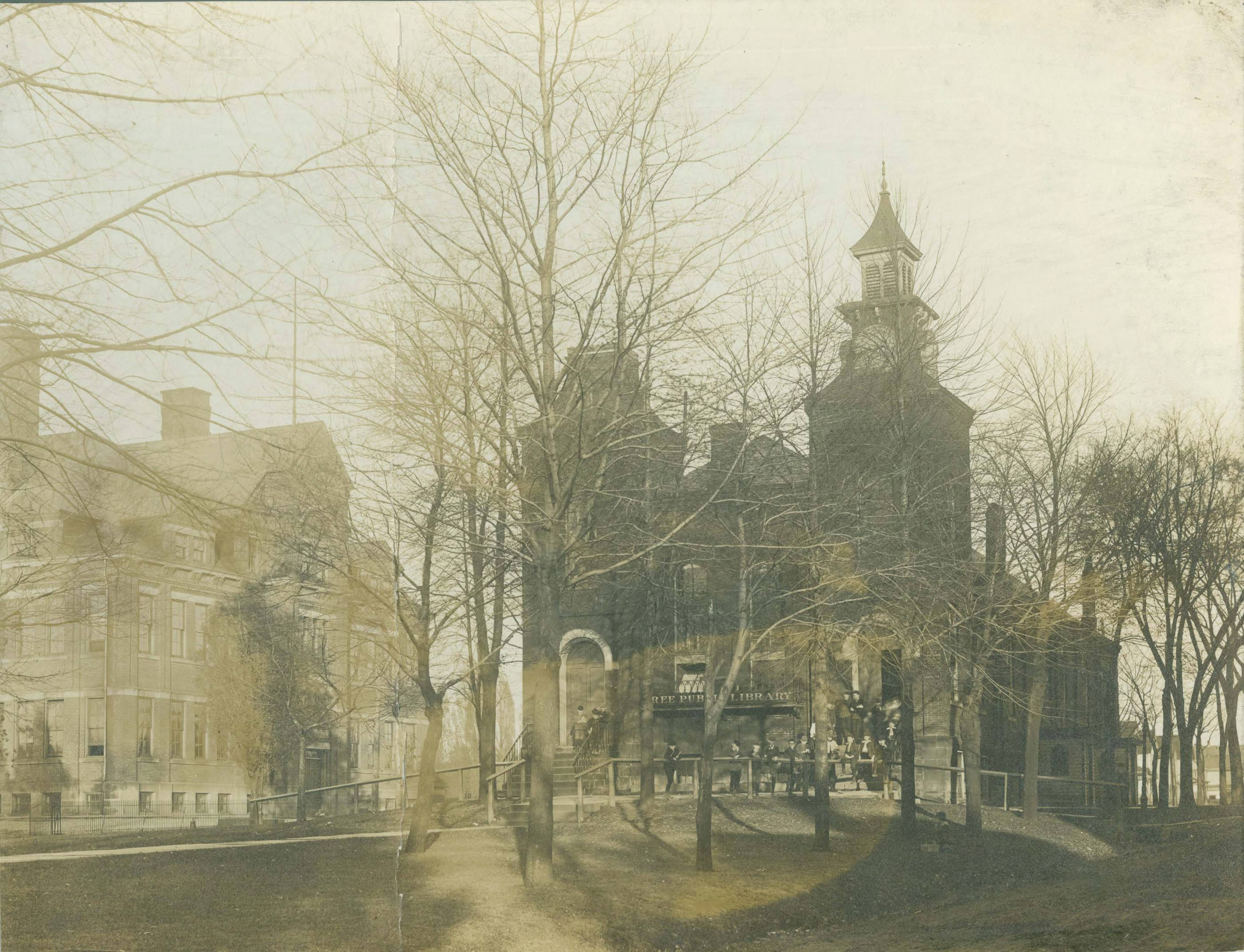
Newburgh Town Hall. This image, taken between 1894 and 1903, shows the town hall in use by the Newburgh branch of the Cleveland Public Library.

By 1860, most people in Newburgh Township worked in the iron and steel industry or in the area's chair and soap factories. The metals industry was so important to the area that it was called the "Iron Ward". The new blast furnaces worked through the night, and were so bright that when a pair of new furnaces began operation in 1861 the fire department believed the city was ablaze. The mills generated noise and soot, and at night the glare from the blast furnaces and Bessemer converters would light up the sky above. The large number of railroad tracks in the area divided neighborhoods, and trains were both loud and heavy polluters.

The population boom led the Village of Newburgh to erect a $3,600 ($100,000 in 2025 dollars) town hall on its village green in 1860, and to enlarge it in 1872. The public square was named Miles Park in honor of its donor, Theodore Miles, in 1877.

As the large influx of immigrants supplanted the New England Yankee culture of the area, which had predominated since its first settlement by whites, new social institutions were formed. Welsh immigrants founded a Sunday school in 1857, which became the Welsh Congregational Church (known colloquially as the Jones Avenue Church and the Welsh Church of Newburg) in 1858. The church moved to a donated house on Wales Street (now E. 86th Street) in 1860. The house was enlarged in 1866, and a much larger church erected alongside the old structure in 1876. The church became known as the Centennial Church in 1881. (Note: The name was inspired by the American centennial, which occurred the year of the building's erection.)

The first Roman Catholic church established in Newburgh was Holy Rosary Church, founded in 1862. (Note: Holy Rosary is the seventh Catholic church erected in Cleveland (established in 1862, along with St. Joseph's Church). It was the first in Newburgh Township. The previously established parish churches were: St. Mary's on the Flats (Columbus Road opposite Rivergate Park on the Columbus Peninsula) in 1840, Cathedral of St. John the Evangelist (1007 Superior Avenue in Downtown Cleveland) in 1852, St. Patrick Church in 1854 (on Whitman Avenue in the Tremont neighborhood), St. Bridget's Church (2508 E. 22nd Street in the Central neighborhood) and St. Peter Church (1533 E. 17th Street in Downtown) in 1857, St. Augustine Church (Starkweather Avenue, between St. Tikhon and St. Olga Avenues in Tremont) in 1860, and St. Joseph's Church (2543 E. 23rd Street in Downtown) in 1862.) The growth of the Catholic community in Ohio was small at first. The first Catholic church in northern Ohio was only built in 1820, and by 1829 there were only two. The first Catholic church in Cleveland wasn't built until 1840. A significant influx of Catholic believers in the early 1840s led to the rapid construction of more churches. The Roman Catholic Diocese of Cleveland was erected on April 13, 1847, and Amadeus Rappe became the first bishop with his consecration on October 10, 1847. The influx of Irish immigrants in the 1850s greatly enlarged the Catholic population in the Union–Miles Park area. A mission, the Church of Newburgh, was founded in 1854 to serve this Irish population. The success of this mission led directly to the founding of Holy Rosary. The congregation initially worshipped on the second floor of the Newburgh Village town hall until its church home was erected at the corner of E. 93rd Street and Miles Park Avenue later that year. Holy Rosary built a new, larger structure at 8328 Broadway Avenue in 1881 (just outside the southwestern border of Union–Miles Park), and the congregation changed their name to Holy Name Church.

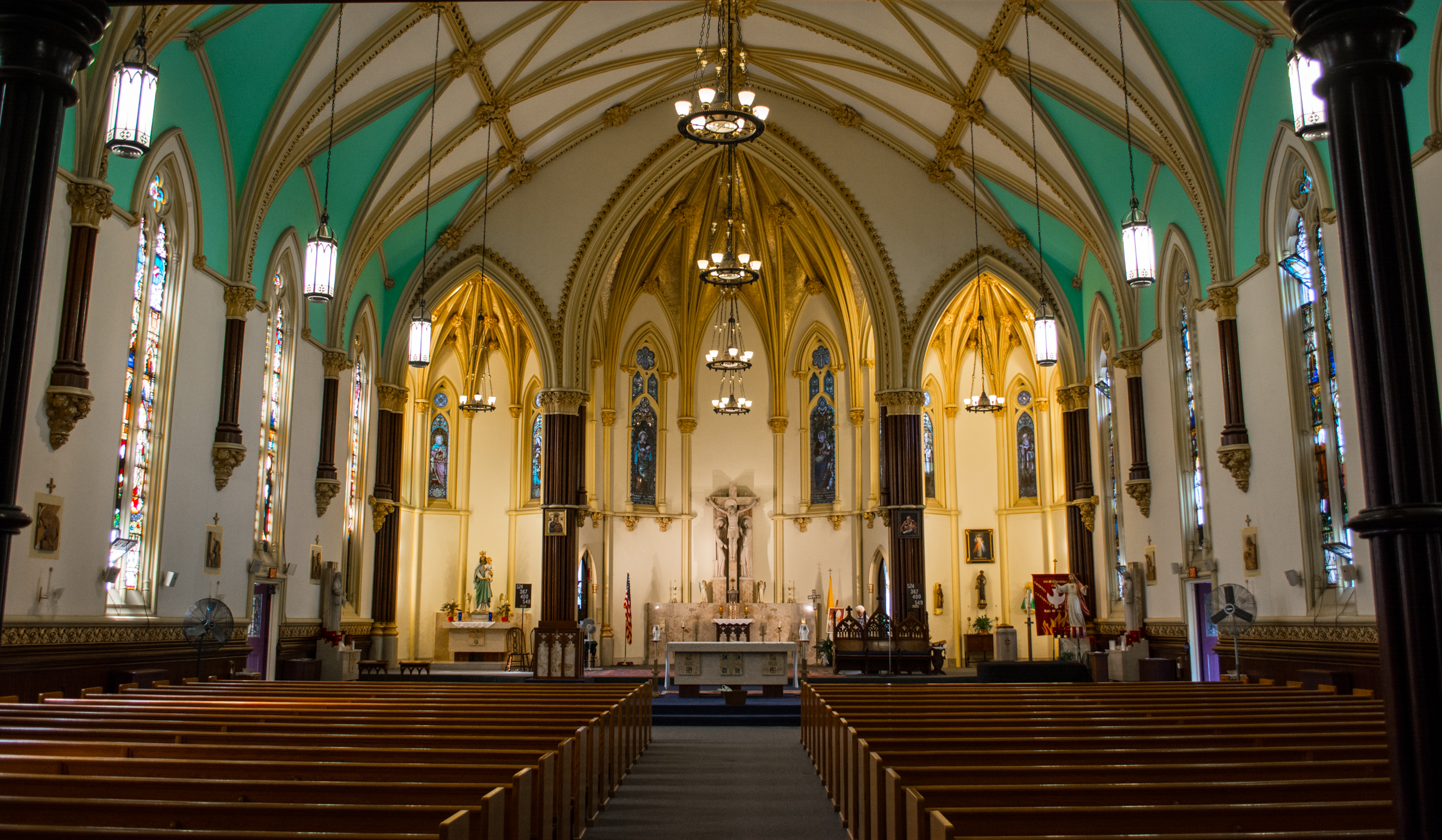
Interior of Holy Name Church in 2017. The church was founded as Holy Rosary in 1862, and moved to its current location and adopted its current name in 1881.

Churches were not the only social organizations to be established. The Freemasons organized the Newburgh Lodge in 1866, and erected a Masonic Hall at what is now 8201 Broadway. In 1916, the lodge contracted with local architect William J. Carter to design and build the Newburgh Masonic Temple six blocks to the southeast at 8910 Miles Park Avenue.

Despite the immense changes in Union–Miles Park since 1856, the area was still quite rural. Nearly all homes in the neighborhood in 1873 were modest (and grimy), and nearly all roads were rutted dirt. Broadway was the only paved street, as it had been lined with stone in 1871 and 1872. Only four dry goods and grocery stores existed on Broadway Avenue, while a meat and vegetable market stood at the corner of Harvard Avenue and E. 91st Street. The area's first newspaper, All Around the Clock, also began publishing in 1873. The newspaper changed its name to the South Cleveland Advocate in 1876. Smoke and soot covered much of the area around the railroad tracks and steel mills.

== Village of Newburgh ==
Village of Newburgh incorporated in 1874, separating the village from the remainder of the township. That same year, the Reeves Opera house opened a few yards north of Cataract House. This three-story stone structure served as a restaurant, saloon, theater, and boarding house. The first fire station in the township opened at E. 91st Street and Walker Avenue (a block north of Miles Park) on February 9, 1875. Equipment consisted of a steam pumper (named the "George B. Senter") and an old ladder truck, both donated by the city of Cleveland. The village's first police station opened in June 1876 on Broadway Avenue in the old Ohio Chair Factory building.

=== Steel strikes and changing demographics ===
A major strike by the Amalgamated Association of Iron and Steel Workers hit Cleveland Rolling Mill in May and June 1882. The company responded by bringing large numbers of Polish and Slovak immigrants into the mills as strikebreakers. The strike was broken, and most of the Irish and Welsh never returned to the mills. The company's tactic prompted a fundamental shift in the neighborhood's identity, from Irish and Welsh to Polish and Slovak. It also created lasting enmity between the western and eastern Europeans in the area.

A second strike occurred at the Cleveland Rolling Mill in July 1885. Poles and Slovaks in the neighborhood successfully encouraged their immigrant kin to avoid becoming strikebreakers. Unable to hire enough replacement workers to staff the plant, the company locked out its employees and closed the plant. When the union engaged in mass picketing in protest, Cleveland police attacked the picket line and 35 strikers were injured. Once more, the strike was broken.

The population increase in the area encouraged the Cleveland Board of Education to establish a third public school in Union–Miles Park in 1886. This was the Woodland Hills School, located on the southwest corner of the intersection of Union Avenue and E. 93rd Street. The same year, the Newburgh branch of the Young Men's Christian Association (YMCA), which had been organized in January 1874, opened its gymnasium and meeting center at 2527 Broadway Avenue (now 8305 Broadway Avenue).

=== Railroads and cemetery ===
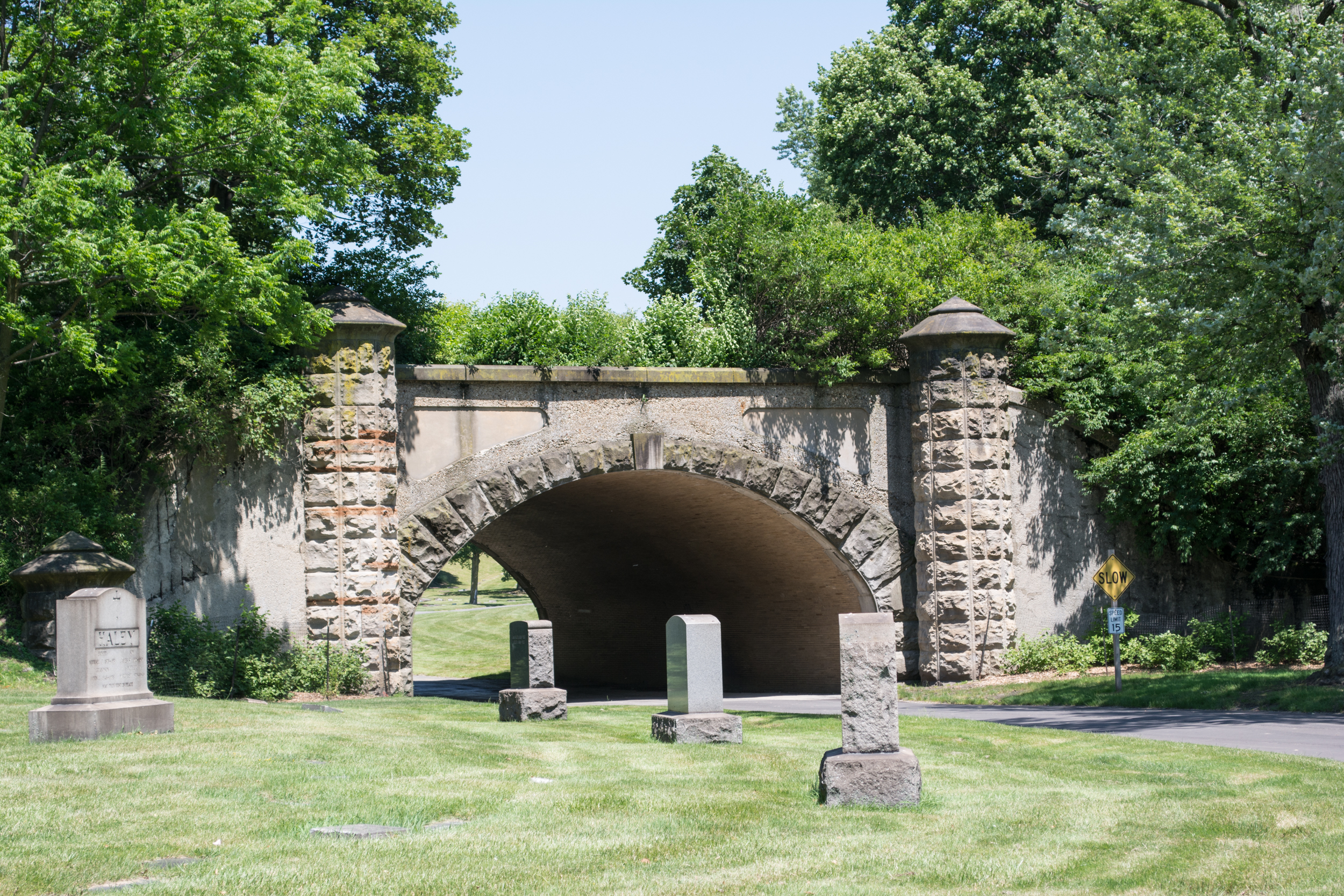
Calvary Cemetery, showing the bridge which connects the two sides of the cemetery beneath the Conotton Valley Railroad tracks

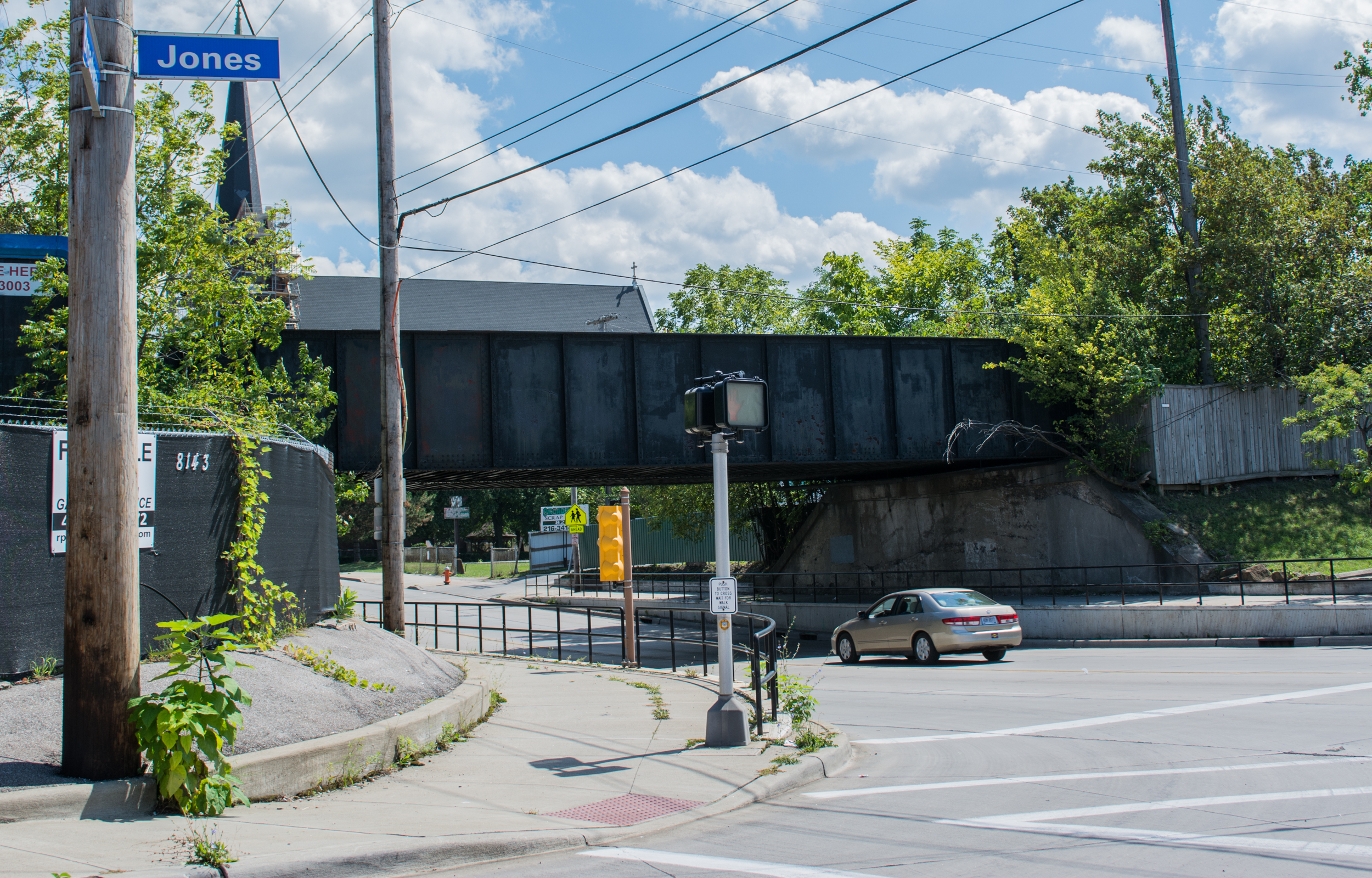
The Newburgh & South Shore Railroad, entering Union–Miles Park via a bridge over Broadway Avenue near Jones Road

Another major railroad built its line through Newburgh beginning in 1881. The Connotton Northern Railroad was incorporated in 1880 to build a line from Canton to Fairport Harbor. The line began construction in Canton and was built about halfway (into Portage County) when the railroad decided that Cleveland would be a better terminus. On November 8, 1880, the Connotton Northern merged with the Connotton Valley Railroad (Note: Not to be confused with a successor company, the Connotton Valley Railway. Both company names are also sometimes referred to as the "Connoton Valley" and the "Conotton Valley".) to form the Connotton Valley Railway. Construction on the line into Cleveland began in 1881, and was completed in January 1882. (Note: The Connotton Valley Railway went bankrupt in 1885, and was absorbed by the Cleveland and Canton Railroad. A holding company, the Cleveland, Canton and Southern Railroad, was organized to take control of the Cleveland and Canton Railroad in 1890. The holding company went bankrupt in 1899, at which time it was acquired by the Wheeling and Lake Erie Railway.) The road's line entered the Union–Miles Park neighborhood at what would later be Calvary Cemetery, ran north to the southern end of the Cleveland Rolling Mill site, then turned southwest and west to follow Morgan's Run before crossing the Cuyahoga River near the Clark Avenue Bridge. The road then followed the Cuyahoga north-northwest to terminate at the Scranton Peninsula.

The Axtell Road Cemetery was demolished in 1880 and the land sold to the Connotton Railway. The Harvard Grove Cemetery was established on Harvard Avenue between E. 59th and E. 64th Streets the same year to accommodate the more than 3,000 bodies which were removed. (Note: The removal of bodies was incomplete. When Union Rolling Mills purchased the old Axtell Street Cemetery property in 1907, its excavations turned up many tombstones and bodies.) While the railroad caused the removal of one cemetery, another was built adjacent to it in 1892, when the Catholic Diocese of Cleveland established a large burial ground, Calvary Cemetery, on the former Leand farm. The cemetery's 105 acres (420,000 m^{2}) all lay on the western side of the Connotton Valley railroad tracks. The cemetery made its first expansion east of these tracks when it purchased another 50 acres (200,000 m^{2}) in 1900.

In 1893, Cleveland's Superior, St. Clair, West Side, and Woodland Avenue streetcar lines merged to create the Cleveland Electric Railway Company ("Big Consolidated"). That same year, the Broadway, East Cleveland, Newburg, and South Side lines merged to form the Cleveland City Railway ("Little Consolidated"). (Note: Big Con absorbed Little Con in 1900. The unified company was often referred to as "Con-Con".) That same year, the city gave permission for "Big Con" to extend its Broadway & Newburgh line east down Miles Avenue. The company built a car barn (or depot) at 10200 Miles Avenue (west of the Lake Erie & Wheeling railroad tracks on the southwest corner of the intersection of E. 102nd Street and Miles Avenue). This car barn was the site of a near-riot by striking workers during the 1899 Cleveland streetcar strike. The first interurban (Note: Interurbans were short distance, light rail trains which ran between, but not within, cities.) to reach Newburgh was the Akron, Bedford and Cleveland Railroad, which opened on October 26, 1895. It began by connecting to the line ran to the Cleveland Electric Railway Company streetcar line at Broadway Avenue, and ran through Cuyahoga Falls to Akron.

The neighborhood received its first public library when the "Newburg Library", a "station" of the Cleveland Public Library, opened in 1894 in the Newburgh Town Hall. (Note: At the time, a "station" was smaller than a "branch" library in the classification system of the Cleveland Public Library.) It was only the second branch of the public library system to open, and the first to open east of the Cuyahoga River.

One of the last major metal industry firms established in Union–Miles Park in the 19th century was the Champion Rivet Company, formed in 1896 but not incorporated until 1900. Its plant was originally located just outside the border of Union–Miles Park at the intersection of Union Avenue and E. 88th Street.

The last major railroad through Union–Miles Park was the Newburgh and South Shore Railroad. The company incorporated in 1899 as a subsidiary of American Steel and Wire. The line, which began construction in 1899 and was complete in 1904, was intended to link the Newburgh area iron and steel plants with those on the Cuyahoga River and near the port of Cleveland. The line began at the company's Central Furnaces and ran briefly south before turning west and crossing the Cuyahoga River at the now-demolished Jefferson Avenue Bridge. The track ran through the company's plant on the west side of the Cuyahoga, and recrossed the river near the now-demolished Clark Avenue Bridge. The road then ran south (passing over Campbell Road and under Harvard Avenue) before turning east. After an at-grade crossing of E. 49th Street and the bridging of E. 71st Street, the tracks turned north at E. 76th Street and followed Jones Road into the Newburgh Works. They terminated at Aetna Road.

By the end of the 19th century, the demographic shift in Union–Miles Park was largely complete. The heart of this community was centered at Aetna Road and E. 93rd Street, where the majority of Poles and Slovaks began settling about 1890. Whereas once the area had been dominated by descendants of New England Yankees and by Irish, Scottish, and Welsh immigrants, the neighborhood was overwhelmingly populated by immigrant Poles and Slovaks by 1900. To accommodate the large number of children in these immigrant families, the Miles School (not to be confused with the Miles Park School) opened in September 1899 just outside the southeast boundary of the Union–Miles Park neighborhood at E. 119th Street and Miles Avenue.

== Annexations ==
=== Early annexations of Newburgh ===
Newburgh Township was formally organized on October 15, 1814. Cleveland became a village on October 23. At that time, its boundaries were the Cuyahoga River, Lake Erie, Erie Street (E. 6th Street) and Huron Road. When Cleveland was incorporated by the state on March 5, 1836, a small triangular section of the township (roughly bounded by what is now E. 22nd Street and the RTA Rapid tracks) was given to Cleveland. The city purchased 11.5 acres (47,000 m^{2}) from landowner George Worthington in April 1850 in order to include the toll gate on Pittsburgh Street (now Broadway Avenue) within the city limits.

Despite the extensive industrialization of Newburgh Township and particularly Union–Miles Park in the 1850s and 1860s, the township offered few amenities. Most of the area was still rural, providing little property tax revenue. There were no firefighting, law enforcement, or freshwater services. Just two streets, Broadway and Miles, had been paved. During this period, many residents of Newburgh Township began agitating to be annexed by the city of Cleveland.

=== 1869–1873 annexation wave ===
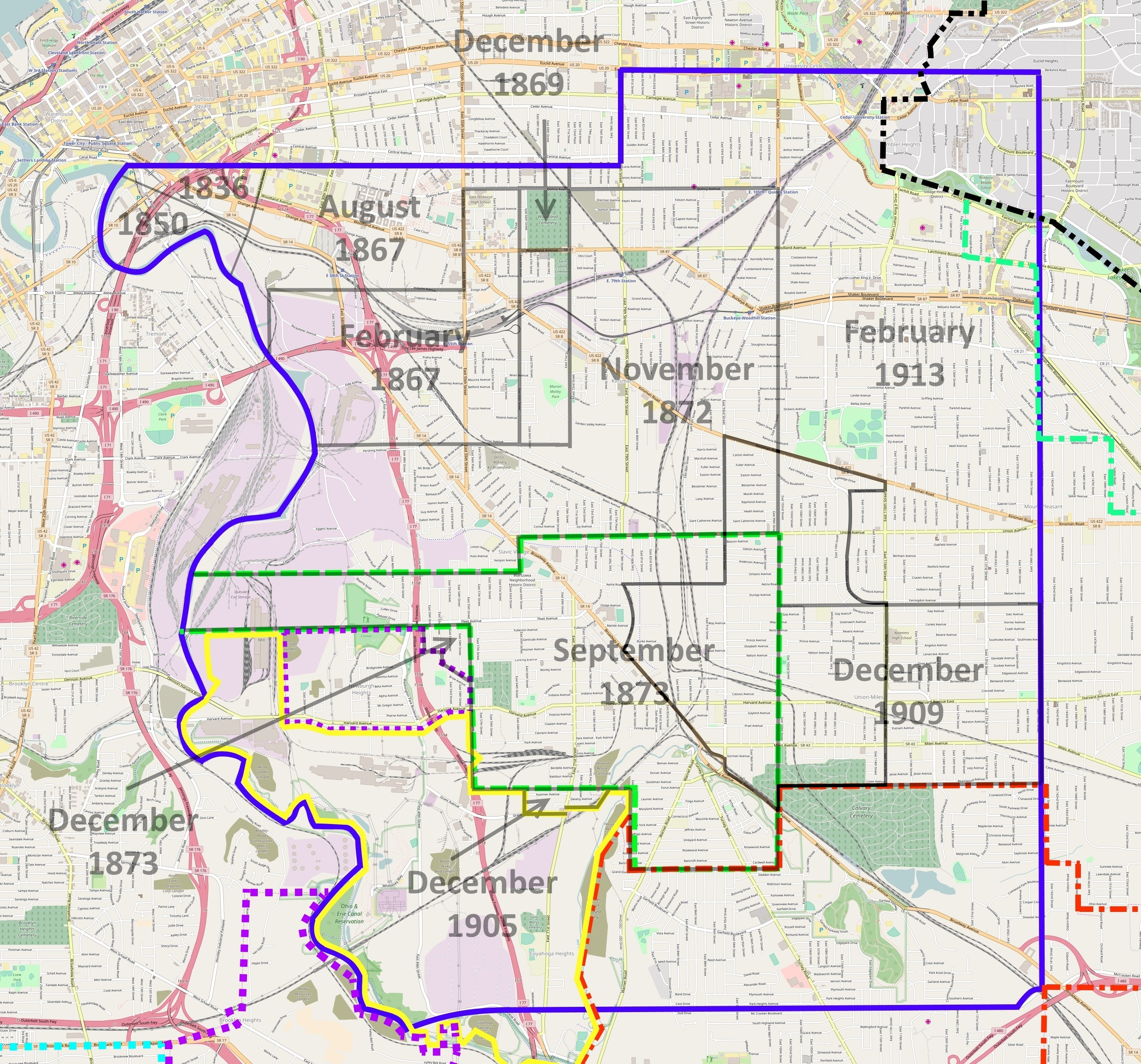
Map showing the original 1814 Newburgh Township, with annexations by the city of Cleveland and others. The Union–Miles Park neighborhood is outlined in black.

Cleveland annexed most of Newburgh Township, including about half of Union–Miles Park, from 1869 to 1873. Both push (developers seeking to annex undeveloped land into the city) and pull (the city seeking to incorporate developed areas) annexation occurred, as Cleveland began absorbing the northwest corner of the township and gradually moved southeast.

The first annexation in this wave occurred on February 28, 1867, when Cleveland absorbed a large, rural, sparsely populated area at the north end of the North Broadway neighborhood. The boundary of this annexation began at the Cuyahoga River at a point due west of the intersection of McBride Avenue and E. 55th Street. It ran due east to E. 65th Street, then north on E. 65th Street to Quincy Avenue, and west on Quincy to E. 55th Street. It then went south on E. 55th Street roughly to Ensign Avenue, west roughly to Rockefeller Avenue, then south to the Cuyahoga River.

The second annexation occurred on August 6, 1867. This included the entire area between the 1836/1850 annexations and the February 1867 annexation. It also included small panhandle section north of Quincy Avenue between E. 55th and E. 71st Streets. A small area (original lot number 333) was annexed on December 14, 1869. It was bordered by the August 1867 annexation on the north and west, Woodland Avenue on the south, and East 75th Street on the east. (This incorporated Woodland Cemetery into the city limits.)

The first part of Union–Miles Park to be annexed by the city of Cleveland was the northern northwest corner. This was part of a large annexation of Newburgh Township which occurred on November 19, 1872. The annexed area border began at E. 75th Street and Quincy Avenue, and ran east to E. 100th Street, then south to Union Avenue, west to E. 65th Street, south to Kenyon Avenue, and then due west to the Cuyahoga River. This pushed Cleveland's city limits up against the northern border of the Village of Newburgh.

On September 16, 1873, the Village of Newburgh agreed to be annexed by Cleveland. The border of this annexation began at E. 100th Street, ran south to Grand Division Avenue, west to E. 77th Street, north to Force Avenue, west to E. 55th Street, north to Fleet Avenue, and then west to the Cuyahoga River. This annexation left the entire western half of Union–Miles Park inside the Cleveland city limits.

=== Later annexations ===
On November 19, 1893, a small portion of Newburgh Township was added to the Cleveland city limits. The boundary of this annexation began at Fleet Avenue and E. 49th Street, and ran south three blocks, east two blocks, south one block, and then diagonally southeast along the north side of Brow Avenue. This brought the city limits to Burk Run.

In 1904, that portion of Newburgh Township west of Mill Creek incorporated as the Village of Newburgh Heights.

Cleveland annexed a small portion of Newburgh Heights on September 25, 1905. This was an area bounded by the north side of Kazimier Avenue, E. 65th Street, Grant Avenue, E. 71st Street, Oak Avenue, and the east side of the Newburgh and South Shore Railroad tracks up to the north side of Deveny Avenue. It aligned Cleveland's border with that of Newburgh Heights.

In 1907, the portion of Newburgh Township south of the Cleveland city limits incorporated as the village of South Newburgh. It incorporated as the city of Garfield Heights in 1930.

Cleveland annexed the incorporated Village of Corlett on December 28, 1909. This roughly square area was encompassed by E. 110th Street on the west, a line equal to the south side of Cotes and Beachwood Avenues on the south, E. 139th Street on the east, and a line equal with Bartlett Avenue in the north. This brought the southeast corner of Union–Miles Park into the Cleveland city limits.

The remaining portion of Newburgh Township was annexed by the city of Cleveland on February 10, 1913. (Note: Small areas of the township had already been absorbed by nearby villages. The village of Cleveland Heights removed a portion of the northeast corner of Newburgh Township (largely bounded by Doan Brook and the Portage Escarpment) when it incorporated in 1903. The Village of Newburgh Heights incorporated in 1904, removing the southwest corner of the township. Shaker Village (now Shaker Heights), incorporated on October 27, 1911, removed another small slice of the northeast corner of the township (an area bounded by E. 127th Street and Larchmere Boulevard).) This added the northeast corner of Union–Miles Park to the city of Cleveland.

The rural and industrial portion of Newburgh Village seceded and formed the Village of Cuyahoga Heights in 1917.

=== Union–Miles Park name ===
Cleveland neighborhood names are generally colloquial, as the people who live in them form a neighborhood identity and began to give a name to the place where they live.

One of the first mentions of the named "Union–Miles Park" in the mass media came in the form of advertisements for homes or apartments for rent in 1926. The Plain Dealer newspaper used the name "Union–Miles Park" for the first time in September 1930. The newspaper's use of the name was rare until 1979, when the Union–Miles Community coalition emerged.

== 20th century ==
=== Pre-depression Union–Miles Park ===
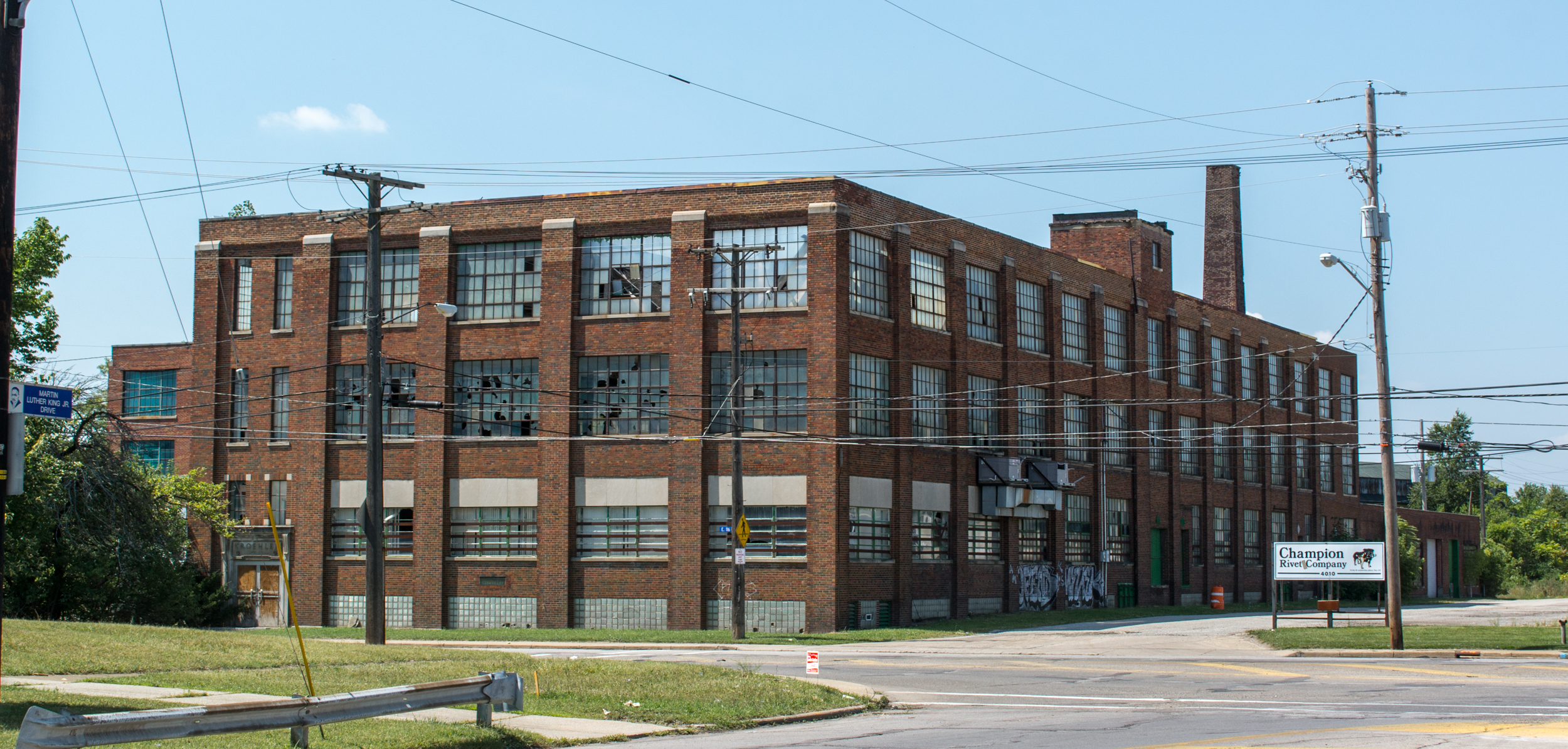
Champion Rivet moved to this factory in 1901.

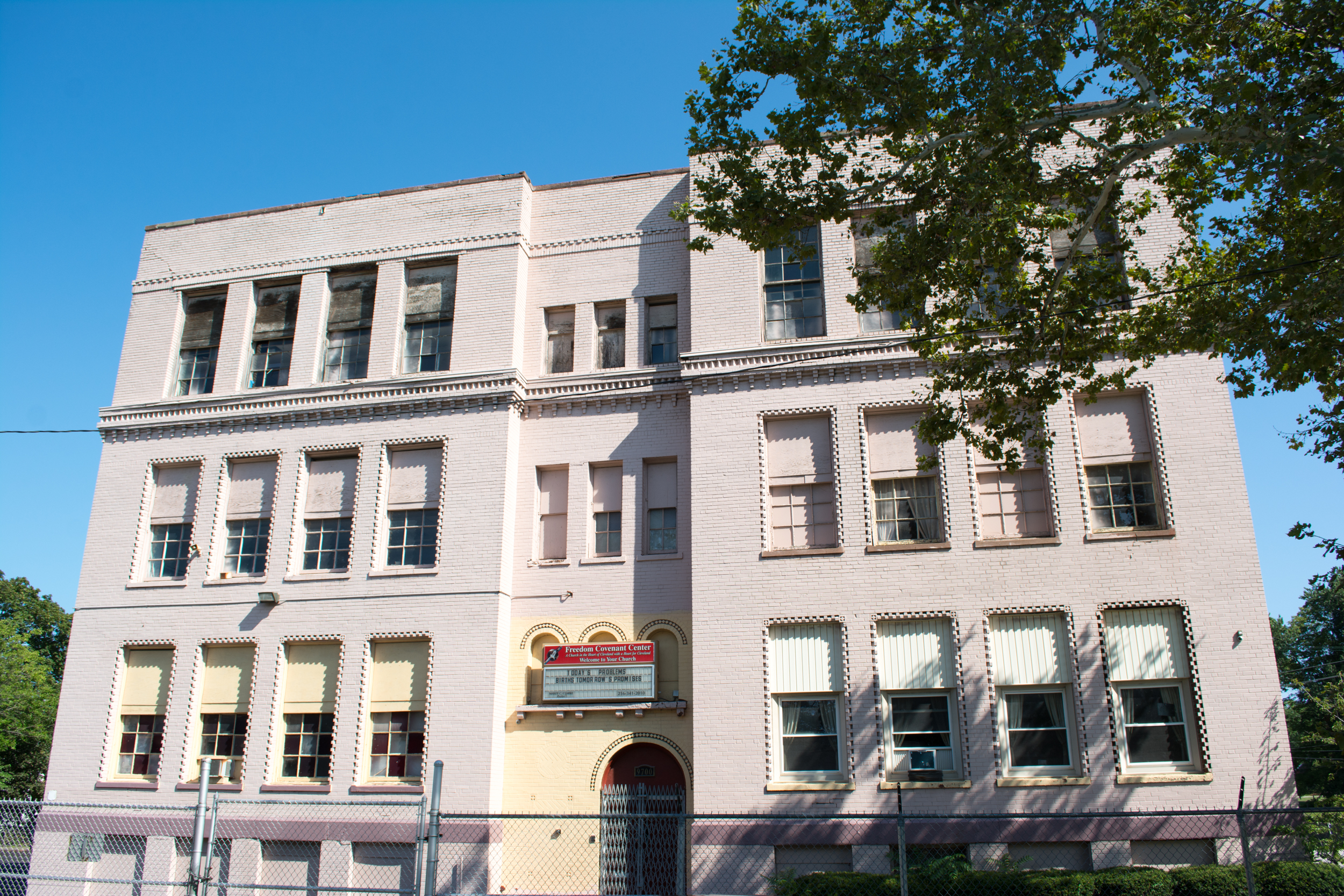
The Boulevard School, opened in 1910, in 2017

In 1904, the Newburgh Town Hall was moved from 9250 Miles Park Avenue slightly to the north at 9213 Miles Park Avenue to make was for a new library building. In 1905, one of the major landmarks of the area was radically changed when the Cleveland and Pittsburgh Railroad (C&P) won approval of a plan to build new, wide tracks on the south side of Broadway Avenue in order to eliminate an at-grade crossing nearby. The plan required digging a new channel for Mill Creek and moving the Mill Creek Falls some 300 feet (91 m) to the south. The waterfalls were moved in 1905.

Large areas of the Union–Miles Park area continued to be under-developed in the early 20th century. Hamilton Avenue was renamed Harvard Avenue in 1905, but the dirt road did not begin to be paved until 1914. Roads were so bad that when St. Catherine Church (at E. 93rd and St. Catherine Avenue) caught fire in March 1899, the poor condition of the roads prevented firefighting personnel from reaching it in time and the new church burned to the ground (and was rebuilt). Even as late as 1906, most of Union–Miles Park still consisted of fields and dirt roads.

Residential growth continued, however, leading to the establishment of more social institutions. The town hall was demolished in 1906, and a new library building erected on the site from 1906 to 1907. The neighborhood's population, which was just 11,000 in 1910, more than doubled to 28,000 in 1930. A new Catholic church, St. Catherine Church, opened in December 1898, and St. Catherine's School opened in the fall of 1900. Another Catholic church, St. Lawrence Church, opened in 1902, as did the associated parochial school, St. Lawrence's School (at E. 81st Street [formerly Rural Street] between Crofoot and Union avenues, just outside the neighborhood's boundary). Nativity of the Blessed Virgin Mary Church (a.k.a. "Nativity B.V.M." and "St. Mary of the Nativity"), a Catholic church ministering specifically to the Slovak community, opened at 9510 Aetna Road in 1903. It was a small, two-story structure with classrooms on the second floor. Strong growth in membership due to continuing high rates of Slovak immigration into the neighborhood led Nativity B.V.M. to move its building to the Dunlap Avenue side of its lot so that the erection of a large new parish school could begin in 1915 on the original church site. The associated parochial school was not dedicated until 1916. The $100,000 ($295,900 in 2025 dollars) structure opened in December 1916.

The iron and steel industry continued to play a large role in the Union–Miles Park economy in the first 25 years of the 20th century. Champion Rivet moved its factory in 1901 to Harvard Avenue between E. 110th and E. 116th streets. The first large metal industries company to open in Union–Miles Park in the 20th century was Champion Machine and Forging, which opened a factory at E. 78th Street and Osage Avenue about 1908. The second was the Allyne-Ryan Company. Founded by C. C. Bohn, E. E. Allyne, Daniel Ryan, and Rollin H. White, it manufactured automobile cylinders and hard-to-cast items at its plant at Aetna Road and E. 91st Street.

The fourth public school in Union–Miles Park, the Boulevard School, opened in 1910. Located at the intersection of Carton Avenue and Kinsman Road, it was designed to alleviate overcrowding at the Mt. Pleasant School.

Infrastructure, too, received a boost in Union–Miles Park when, some time between 1900 and 1910, the Cleveland and Pittsburgh Railroad opened its Newburgh station at Harvard Avenue and Broadway. The Cleveland Short Line Railway began construction in May 1906 from the Lake Shore and Michigan Southern Railway (LS&MS) main line on the border between the Riverside and Bellaire–Puritas neighborhoods of Cleveland (an area known to railroads as "Rockport"), to the LS&MS rail yard in Collinwood, Ohio. The first 10.08-mile (16.22 km) section, from Rockport to the Lake Erie and Pittsburgh Railway (a block south of the intersection of Broadway and Harvard Avenues in the Slavic Village neighborhood, an area known to railroads as "Marcy") opened on February 24, 1910. The remaining 9.56 miles (15.39 km) of the line, which cut through Union–Miles Park, opened on July 1, 1912.

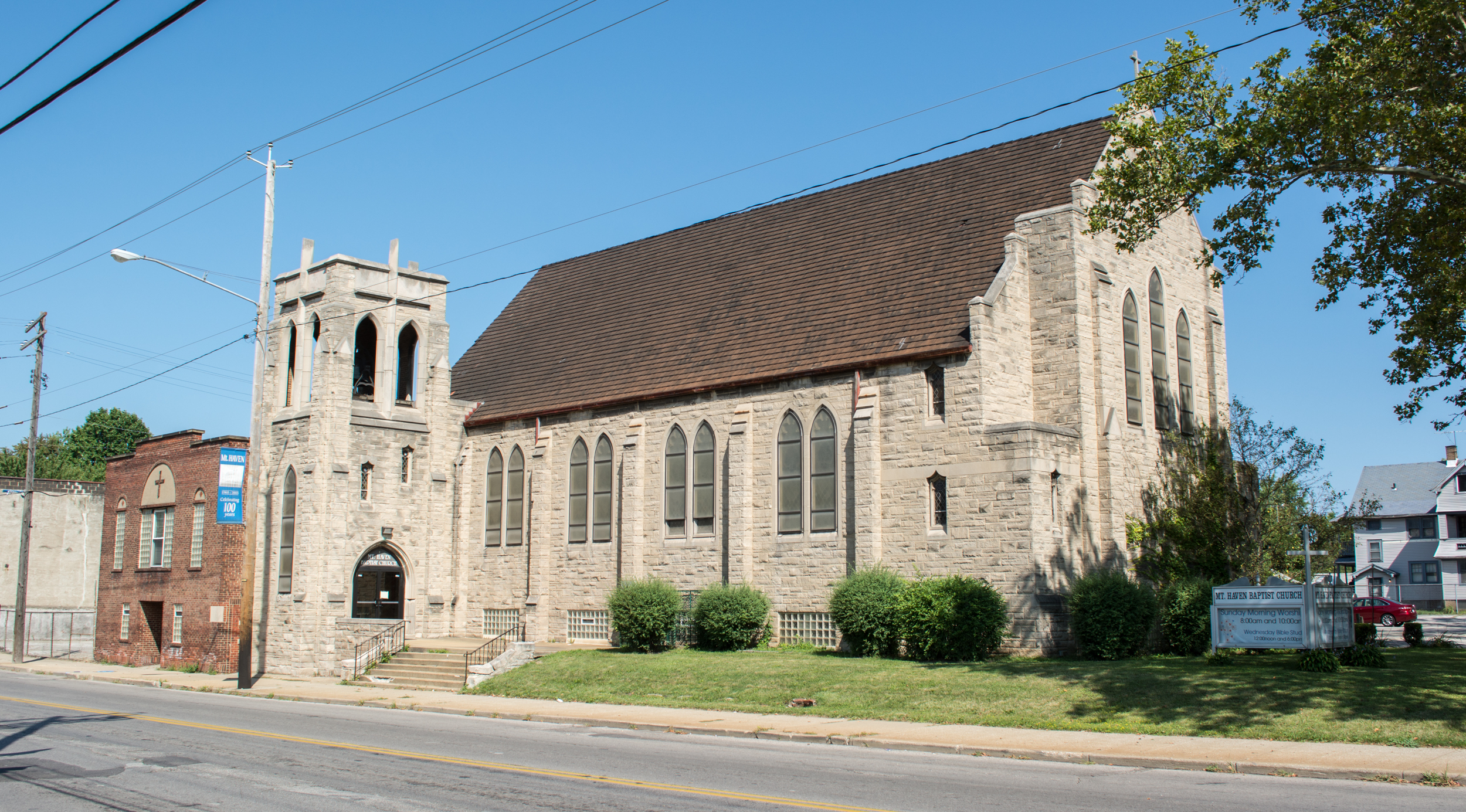
Concordia Lutheran Church, after its expansion. The original church is the small, red brick building to the left.

Several more churches were founded in Union–Miles Park in the 1910s and 1920s. The congregation which would later be known as St. Joseph Byzantine Catholic Church formed in 1909, and built a small, wood-frame church at 9321 Orleans Avenue in 1913. Concordia Lutheran Church, a congregation for African Americans, was founded 1914, and erected its first church building and school in 1916 at what is now Union Avenue and Martin Luther King Drive. The congregation that formed Archangel Michael Orthodox Church (a.k.a. St. Michael's Orthodox Church) split from St. John the Baptist Orthodox Church in 1921. It began construction of its new church home at 10000 Union Avenue in April 1924, completing the structure in 1926.

Although the long-standing Cataract House closed in 1917, the first Union–Miles Park movie theater, the Milo Theater, opened at Miles Avenue and E. 100th Street in 1918.

One of the last large metals industry firms to open in Union–Miles Park, Superior Screw, built its factory at Aetna Road and E. 93rd Street in 1920. The last school to open before the depression, Paul Revere Elementary, opened adjacent to the neighborhood's northeast boundary at E. 108th Street and Sandusky Avenue in 1920. An addition was built from 1925 to 1926.

Miles Park Methodist Church lost its 85-foot (26 m) high steeple in 1925. (Note: Another source claims it was lost to wind about 1900.) Miles Park Presbyterian renovated the interior of its church in 1935, leaving little of historic character.

Nativity of the Blessed Virgin Mary Church built a much larger, Italian Renaissance Revival church at 9614 Aetna Road, adjacent to its parish school. The new church opened in October 1927.

=== Great Depression: Collapse of the steel industry and growth of churches and schools ===
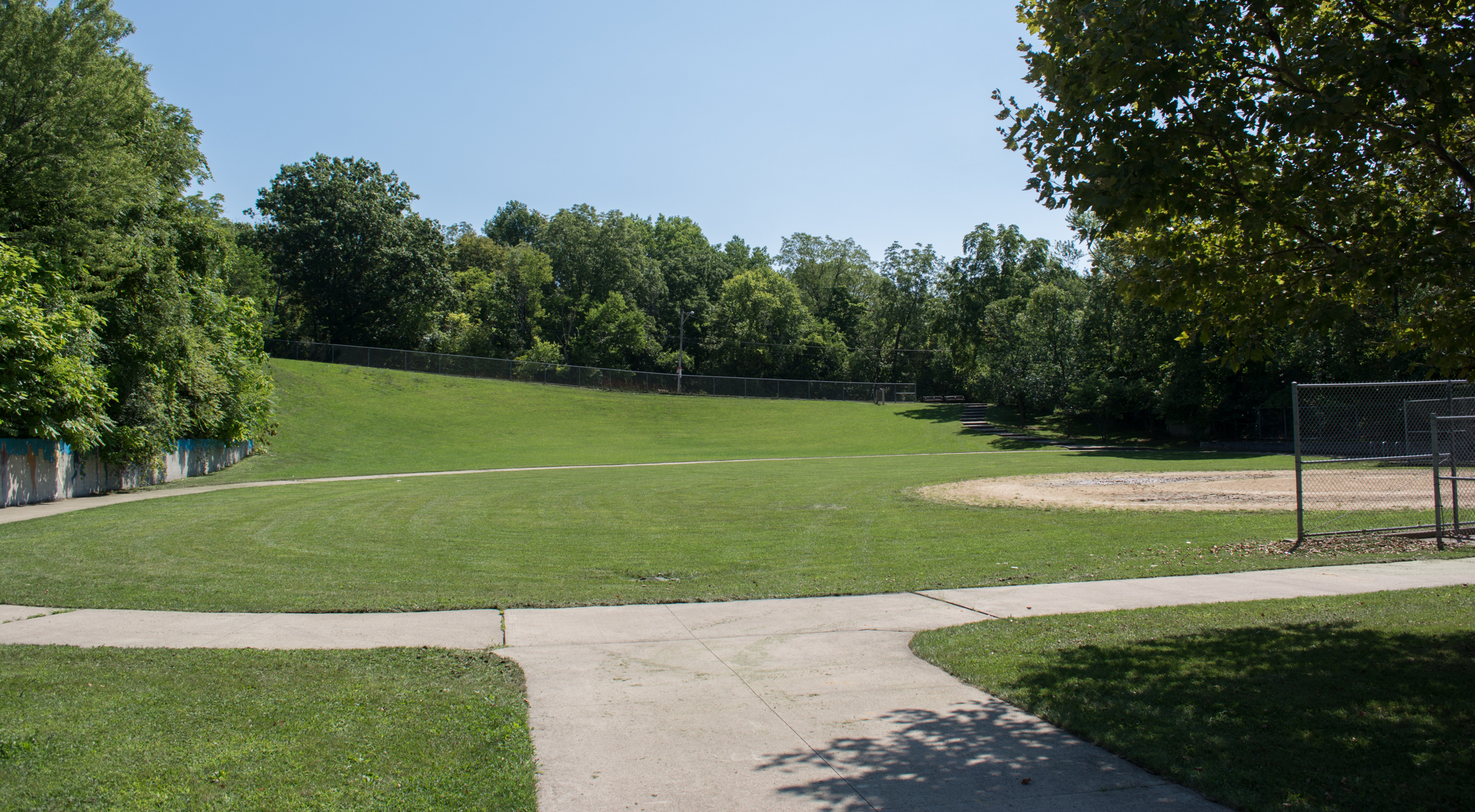
Looking east through Bisbee Park (now Carol McClendon Park)

Although U.S. Steel had continued to expand in the area west of Union–Miles Park from 1900 to 1925, (Note: U.S. Steel opened its Cuyahoga Works in 1908 on the east bank of the Cuyahoga River south of the Wheeling & Lake Erie Railroad tracks. In 1911, U.S. Steel added a fourth blast furnace (Furnace D) to the Central Furnaces. The company's American Steel & Wire subsidiary opened a coke works just north of the Cuyahoga Works in 1916.) the Great Depression led to the collapse of the steel industry in the neighborhood. U.S. Steel had been created from a wide range of companies. Rather than an integrated plant, the company found that gross inefficiencies emerged as the pieces of the company attempted to work together to make steel. The company had to move molten iron 6.5 miles (10.5 km) from the Central Furnaces to the Newburgh Works using congested railroads. Once converted into steel, the steel had to be shipped to other Cleveland area plants for conversion into beams, plate, rods, and wire. U.S. Steel announced on December 1, 1932, that it would close the Newburgh Works in four months. The mill's furnaces and Bessemer converters went cold on April 30, 1933, and its demolition began in September 1935. Superior Screw moved to Shaker Heights, Ohio, in 1933 as well.

Although the closure of the Newburgh Works meant the loss of 2,000 jobs, the Union–Miles Park neighborhood continued to see new schools and other buildings erected. John Adams High School, the first secondary school in the area, opened on the eastern border of Union–Miles Park at the intersection of Corlett Avenue and E. 116th Street in 1923. Nathan Hale Elementary School opened in 1928 at 3588 East Blvd. (now Martin Luther King Jr. Drive). The library at the old town hall moved into a new structure at 9213 Union Avenue in 1931. It was promoted to "branch" status and moved into a large new building at 9319 Union Avenue in 1939.

In 1933, St. Joseph Byzantine built a new, much larger church home next to its existing small wood-frame structure. This Romanesque Revival structure featured two towers with copper domes and extensive interior mural paintings. Concordia Lutheran also expanded the same year, significantly enlarging its church. Miles Park School, too, added space, building an auditorium, classroom, and gymnasium.

Union–Miles Park received its first public park when 2 acres (8,100 m^{2}) of land at the eastern end of Beacon Avenue were converted into Bisbee Park in July 1939. The park was created through the efforts of a neighborhood businessmen's club, the city, and the federal Works Progress Administration. (Note: The park was renamed for Carol McClendon, a long-time Cleveland City Council member who represented the area, after her death in 2004.)

=== 1940 to 1959: Slow decline ===
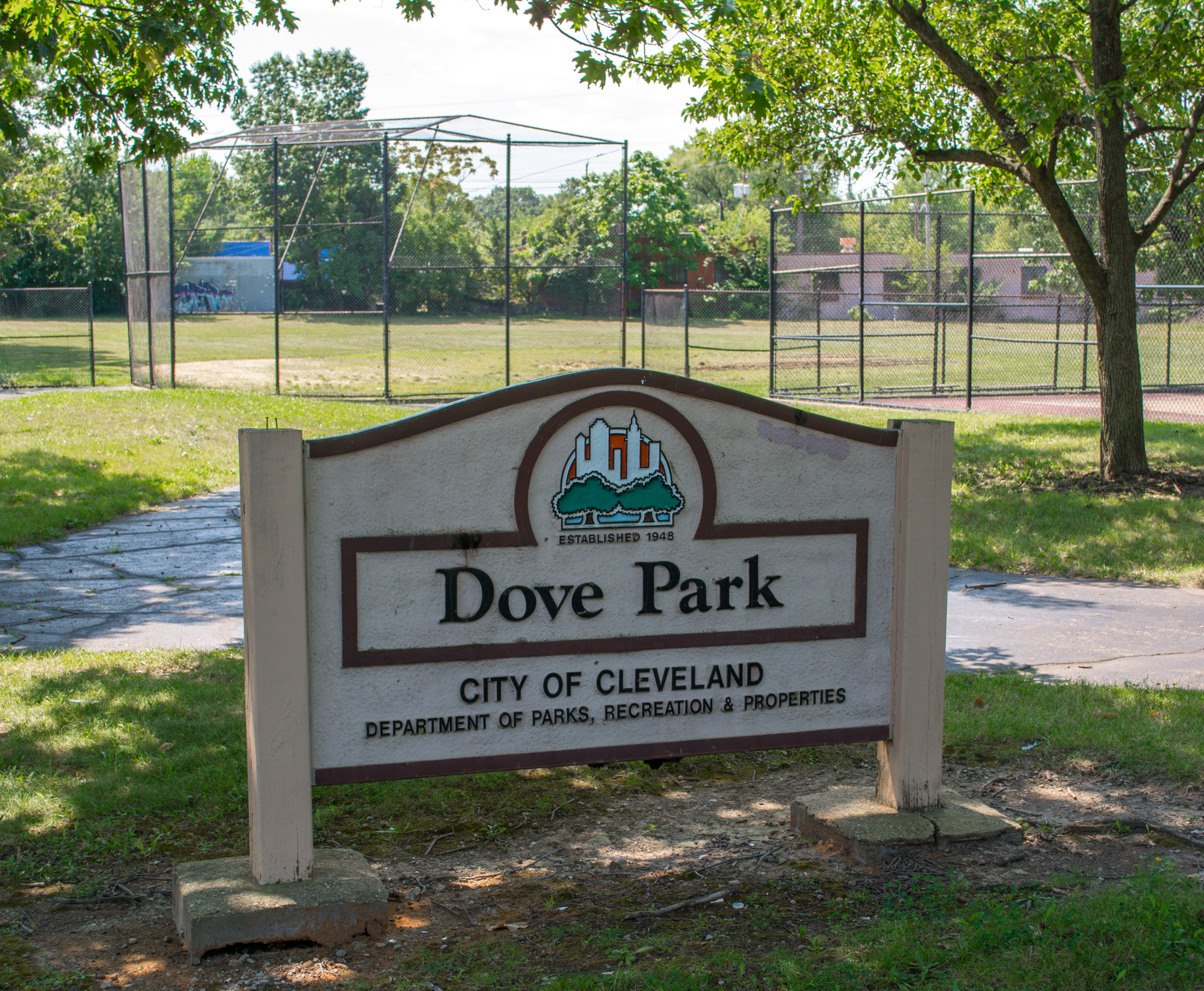
Dove Park in 2017

Simmons Manufacturing, which purchased the former Superior Screw building in 1933, Simmons vacated the building in the late 1930s, and it was purchased by United States Ordnance Engineers, Inc. (a subsidiary of Lake Erie Chemicals) in April 1941 for use as a war materiél factory. Lake Erie Chemicals would retain ownership of the structure after the war, and it housed a wide variety of small manufacturers until 1957 when Braden Sutphin Ink purchased and moved into the building.

The city of Cleveland constructed a second public park in Union–Miles Park in 1948, Dove Park.

Once Cleveland's most important industry, the steel industry in the city began to shrink again in the 1950s. Gartland, which changed its name to Superior Foundry in 1901, expanded in 1955 and purchased Allyne-Ryan in 1958. It then closed the Allyne-Ryan plant in 1960, sold the Allyne-Ryan plant in September 1961, and went out of business itself in October 1961.

A rise in the demand for specialty steel helped offset these losses somewhat, and Union–Miles Park remained a Central and Eastern European ethnic enclave until the 1960s. This enabled the Catholic presence in the neighborhood to continue to thrive. In 1955, St. Mary's Ukrainian Catholic Church broke ground on its new church home at Kinsman Road and E. 105th Street. That same year, St. Joseph Byzantine Catholic Church began construction on a $400,000 ($4,800,000 in 2025 dollars), eight-room school and parish rectory. The structures were completed in 1957, and the original 1913 church demolished.

Nevertheless, the population of Union–Miles Park dropped 19.0 percent between 1940 and 1960.

=== 1960 to 1979: Rapid demographic change ===
Historical population
Year	Pop.	±%
1930	28,000	—
1940	26,548	−5.2%
1950	24,948	−6.0%
1960	23,010	−7.8%
1970	23,214	+0.9%
1980	19,299	−16.9%
1990	17,338	−10.2%
2000	15,464	−10.8%
2010	19,004	+22.9%

U.S. Steel slowly closed its operations in Cleveland in the 1960s and 1970s. By the late 1960s, the loss of these high-paying manufacturing jobs, improved public transportation and commuter highway systems, and the growth in both job opportunities and worker housing in the suburbs had convinced most Czechs, Poles, Slovaks, and other whites to leave Union–Miles Park for new homes outside the city.

Champion Machine and Forging (renamed Champion Forge) closed in 1965. The firm was purchased by Schott Industries in 1948, and then by Steel Improvement in 1954. The building was leased to several small manufacturers after Champion Forge ceased to exist.

White flight in the 1960s caused a steep decline in the neighborhood. Many absentee property owners no longer gave their homes the right amount of maintenance, and mortgage defaults, foreclosures, and sheriff's sales became common. Many homes were simply abandoned. The presence of even one or two abandoned or closed homes on a block caused the value of surrounding properties to fall significantly. As the number of empty or abandoned buildings rose, so did crime, squatting, and vandalism, and the remaining property owners often reduced their maintenance even further. This white flight so devastated the Central and Eastern European communities of Union–Miles Park that many of the churches and other social institutions these communities supported neared collapse by 1970.

The racial makeup of Union–Miles Park changed as the local Union–Miles Park economy worsened. African Americans had long been restricted to Cleveland's Central neighborhood by white refusal to sell or rent to blacks, restrictive housing covenants, and low incomes. Few blacks lived outside Central; just 2,300 African Americans (10 percent of the total neighborhood population) lived in Union–Miles Park in 1960. Throughout the 1960s and 1970s, African Americans moved into Cleveland neighborhoods being abandoned by whites—neighborhoods once denied to blacks, but now with plenty of empty housing being sold at steep discounts. Although Cleveland as a whole lost 52 percent of its population from 1960 to 1980, the city's African American population held steady. There were 253,108 African American residents in Cleveland in 1960 (28.9 percent of total population), and 252,481 blacks in Cleveland in 1980 (44 percent of total population)—a loss of just 627 people. As a percentage of population, however, African Americans rose from 28.9 percent of the total population in 1960 to 44 percent of the total population in 1980.

In Union–Miles Park, the population actually rose by 0.9 percent from 1960 to 1970, and dropped just 16.9 percent from 1970 to 1980. During the same period, Cleveland as a whole lost 14.3 percent and 23.6 percent of its population, respectively. The total population figures for Union–Miles Park mask the underlying racial shift, which was already apparent by 1972. The markedly lower population losses in Union–Miles Park were due to a large influx of African American residents, and by 1980 90 percent of all residents in the neighborhood were African American.

These demographic changes affected social institutions in the neighborhood. As middle-class African Americans left the area for the suburbs, the churches they supported were often unable to survive. St. Philip's, a black-majority Lutheran church located in the Kinsman neighborhood, merged with Concordia Lutheran in September 1965, with the new congregation using Concordia's building. Concordia Lutheran engaged in a "merger of strength" with St. John Lutheran in Independence, Ohio, in 1967, and sold its building to Mt. Haven Baptist Church.

The Cleveland public school system continued to invest in the neighborhood, however. The district approved a $1.39 million ($12,200,000 in 2025 dollars) replacement for the Miles Park School at 4090 E. 93rd Street in 1969. Delayed a year by a construction workers' strike, the new school opened in September 1971. A new Woodland Hills School began construction in 1969 as well, and completed in 1973.

In June 1977, Archangel Michael Orthodox Church moved to Broadview Heights, Ohio. It sold its old church home, school, and social hall to other organizations, most notably El Hasa Temple Number 28. This Shriners lodge lost its building at 1809 E. 55th Street to fire in June 1976. Beginning in 1977, it rented (and later purchased) the former St. Michael's social hall for use as its new headquarters. Miles Park Methodist Church closed its doors in 1978, and sold its church structure to Allen Chapel Missionary Baptist Church.

Cleveland had long suffered from racially discriminatory practices by lending institutions, and in 1979 residents of Union–Miles Park began picketing lenders, including the Federal Housing Administration (FHA). By this time, the Union–Miles Park neighborhood was crime-ridden and decaying. The neighborhood was still solidly blue-collar, and the 1973–75 recession hit the area especially hard. Many of the most affordable homes were owned or leased by public housing agencies, yet these homes were some of the most decrepit in the area. In the spring of 1979, 100 block clubs in the neighborhood formed an umbrella group, the Union-Miles Community Coalition, to work more effectively as an advocate for improved housing and city services in the area.

=== 1980 to 1999: Destabilization and recovery ===
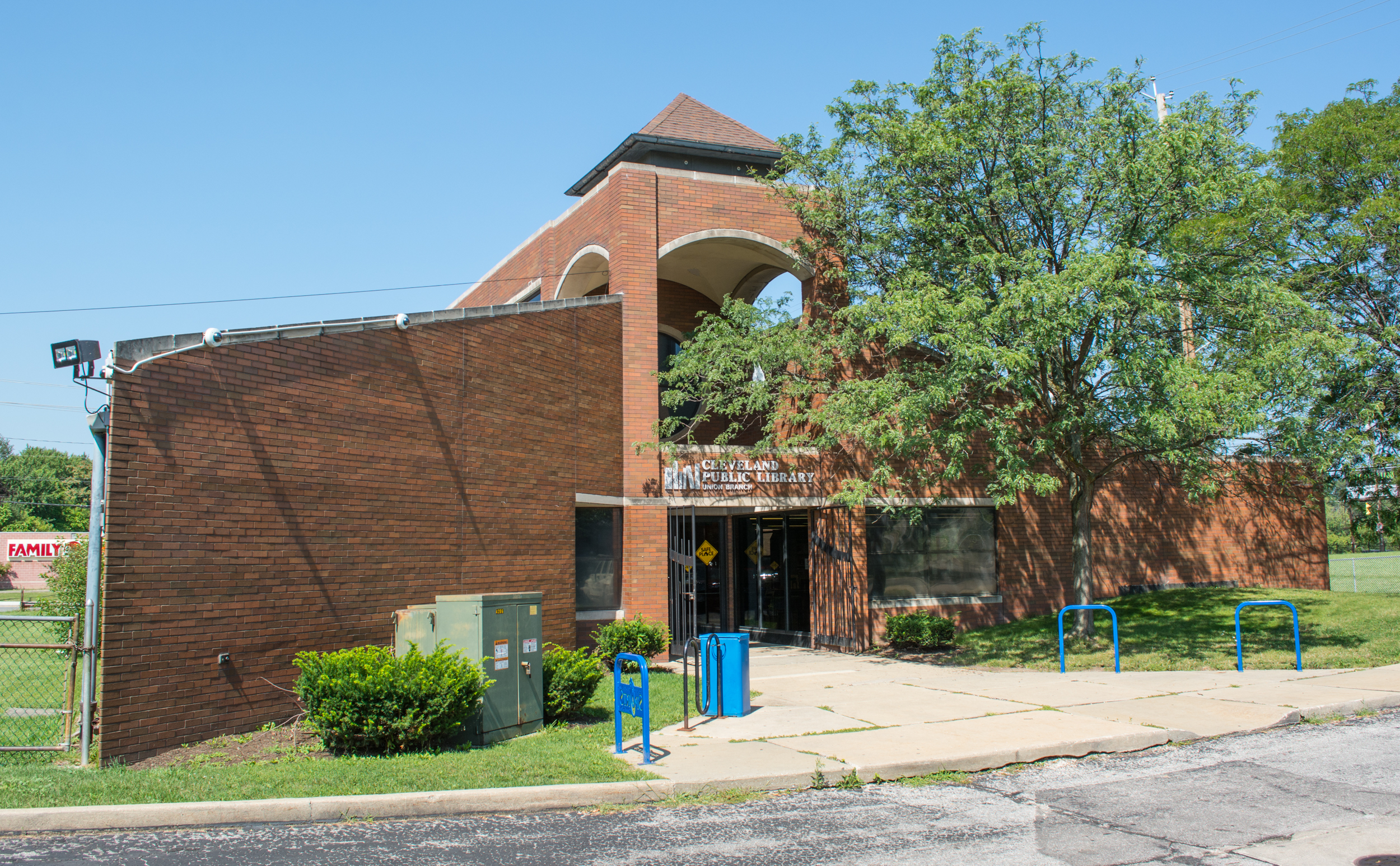
The 1982 Union Branch, a unit of the Cleveland Public Library system

The 1980 recession and the early 1980s recession both hit Union–Miles Park hard, leaving the community with 25 percent of its residents living below the federal poverty line. The congregation at St. Joseph Byzantine moved to the suburbs in April 1980, selling its building to Greater Zion Hill Baptist Church. The Boulevard School closed in the fall of 1980 due to falling enrollment.

The Union-Miles Community Coalition had taken on an increasing number of tasks since its formation. Initially, it pressed the city to provide improved basic services, and to tear down abandoned, decrepit, or vandalized housing. It formed neighborhood watch programs and safety patrols, and it pushed local banks to establish branches in the neighborhood and provide more lending in the area. To enable it to take on increasingly complex problems requiring full-time staff and public and private financing, the coalition formed the nonprofit Union Miles Development Corporation (UMDC) on May 1, 1981. Working with the Center for Neighborhood Development, UMDC won passage of a new state law allowing nonprofit community development corporations to act as receivers for abandoned housing. UMDC also established the Cleveland Housing Receivership Project, which acted as a clearinghouse and advisory body to member neighborhood housing groups interested in using receivership to improve their Cleveland neighborhoods.

In 1982, the city built a new, $1.8 million ($6,000,000 in 2025 dollars) Union Branch library at 3463 E. 93rd Street. The 1906 library building on Miles Park, which had been vacated since the construction of the Union "station" library years before, remained open for community use until 1987.

The early 1980s recession crippled U.S. Steel's few remaining operations in Cleveland. The corporation closed its last large plant, the Cuyahoga Works, in May 1984. One of the neighborhood's landmark structures, the Newburgh Town Hall, burned in 1984. The structure was sold in 1923 to the Thomas Funeral Home (later known as the Thomas-Wheaton Funeral Home). It was added to the National Register of Historic Places in 1973, converted into an apartment building some time between 1978 and 1984, and rented by a motorcycle club as its clubhouse. The fire on November 18 caused more than $50,000 ($200,000 in 2025 dollars) in damage, and it was demolished in October 1985. The continuing job and population losses among blue-collar workers in Union–Miles Park left 40 percent of the area's housing stock abandoned and demolished. By 1989, housing foreclosure rates in the area reached 35 percent, causing runaway neighborhood decline.

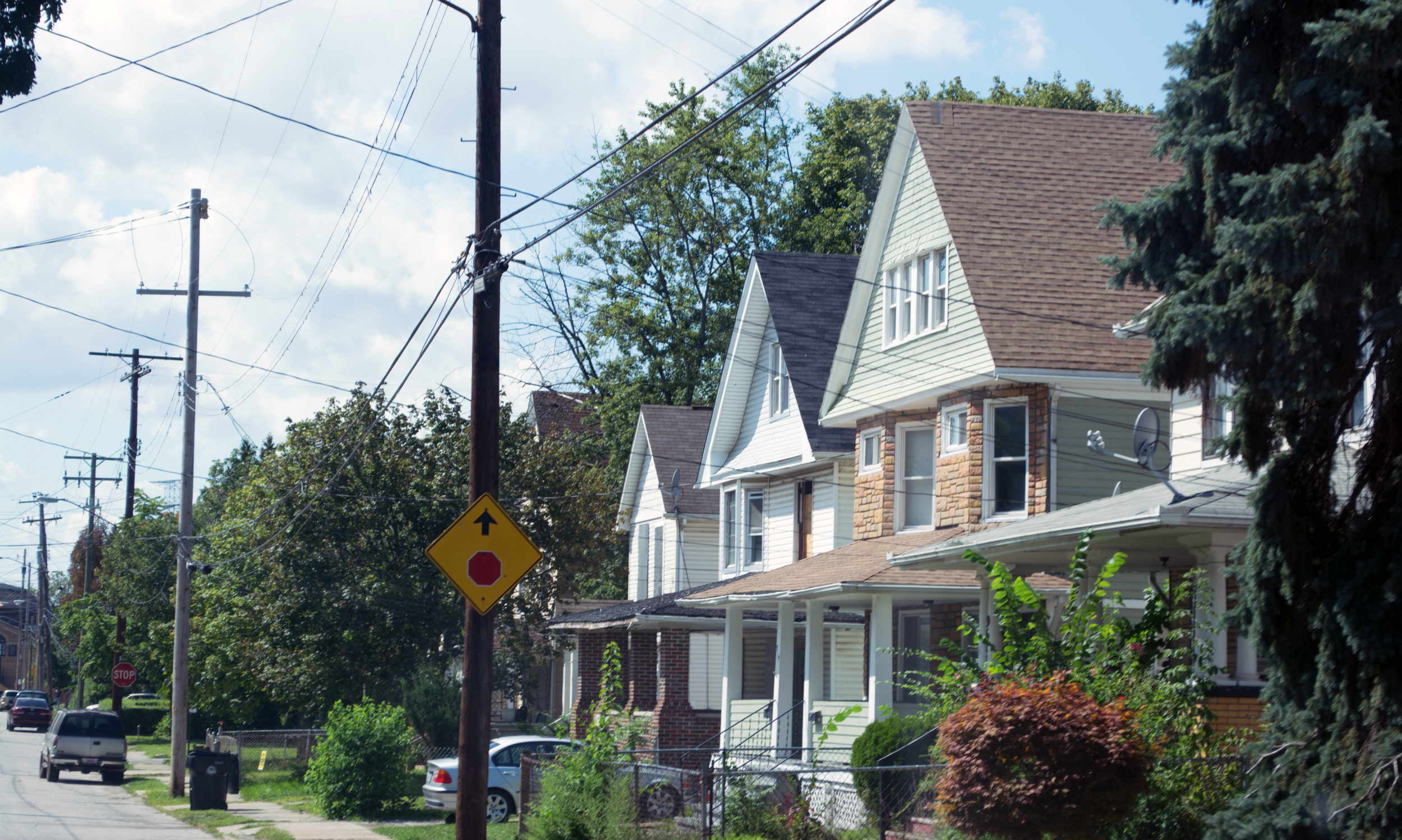
Houses on Pratt Avenue at E. 97th Street

By the late 1980s, Union–Miles Park had become a transitional neighborhood. As poor African Americans in the Kinsman neighborhood achieved a measure of financial stability and wealth, they moved into Union–Miles Park. As working-class African Americans moved into the middle class, they left Union–Miles Park for suburbs like Warrensville Heights. Despite improvements in some city services in the late 1980s, including the refurbishment of Bisbee and Dove parks, Union–Miles Park suffered a 10 percent population loss between 1980 and 1990. By 1990, the racial composition of the neighborhood had risen to 95 percent African American. Poverty had also worsened in the neighborhood. Union–Miles Park was ranked 13th in 1970 in terms of the Cleveland neighborhoods with the highest level of poverty. By 1990, it was ranked 8th, with 60.9 percent of all residents living below the federal poverty line—making it one of the poorest neighborhoods anywhere in Cleveland or Cuyahoga County.

Aging housing stock and more closures in what was left of the steel industry continued to negatively impact Union–Miles Park in the 1990s. Although a few market-rate housing developments were built in the 1990s, the area population declined 10.8 percent from 1990 to 2000. The population loss was greatest among middle-class families, which led to even greater disinvestment in housing and the loss of the neighborhood's few retail districts. Poverty levels rose to 28.0 percent, and 9.1 of all housing units in the neighborhood were vacant. John Adams High School closed in 1995 and was torn down in 1999. Mt. Pleasant School was also closed in 1995 (and scheduled for demolition by the end of 2017).

Nativity of Blessed Virgin Mary Church closed on December 27, 1992. The congregation had dwindled to less than 120 worshippers, and had been without a full-time priest for nine years. Area priests had been filling in on a temporary basis, but illness and other duties deprived the congregation of its last pastor in late 1992 so the diocese decided to close the church.

== Union-Miles Park in the 21st century ==
=== Stabilization and new schools ===
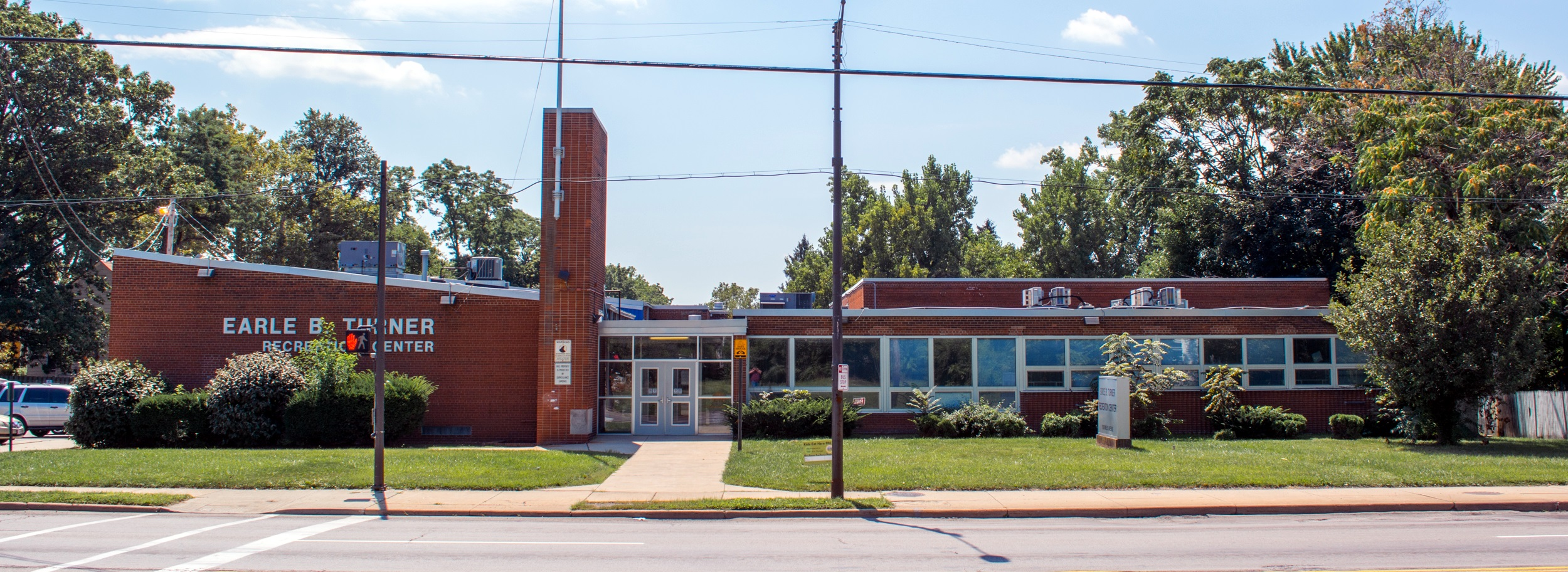
The Earle B. Turner Recreation Center

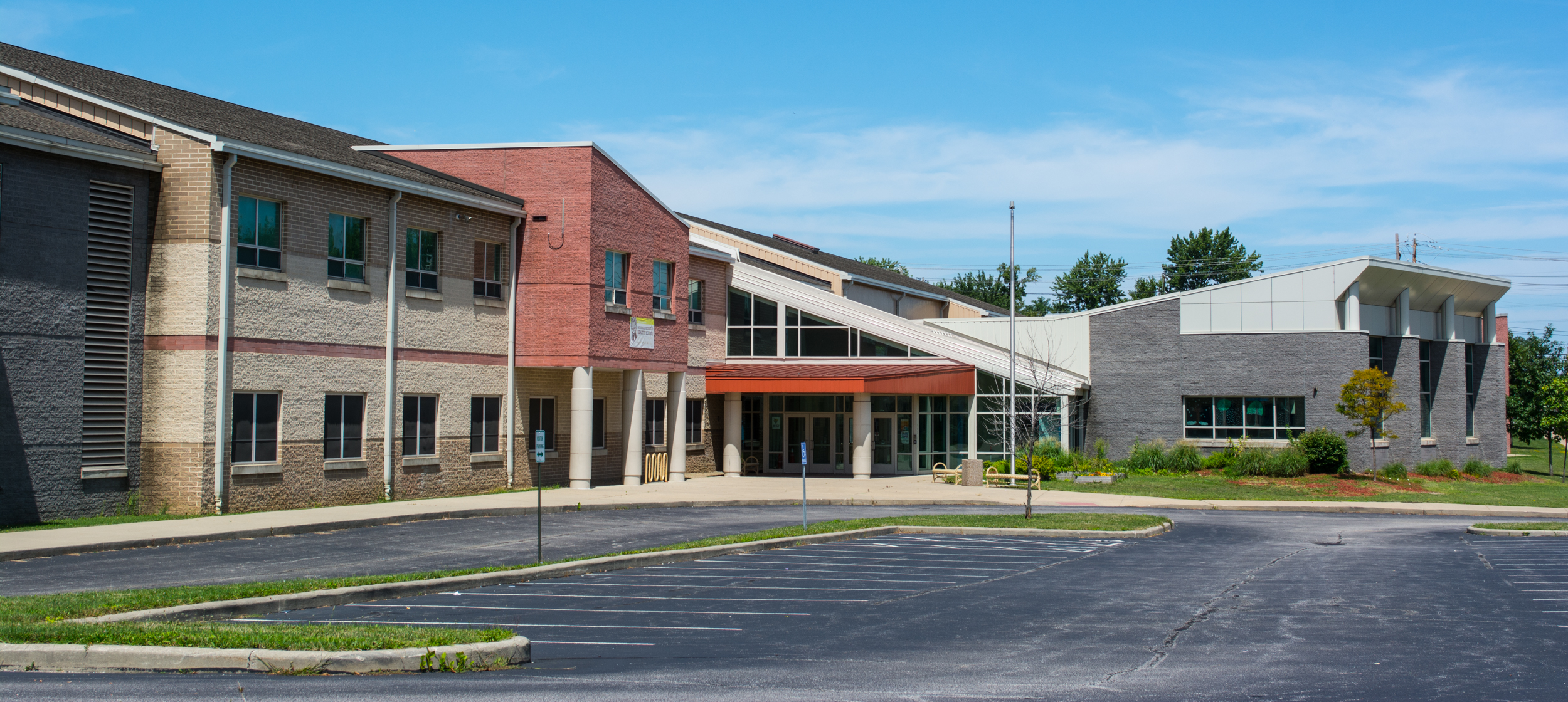
Miles Park School

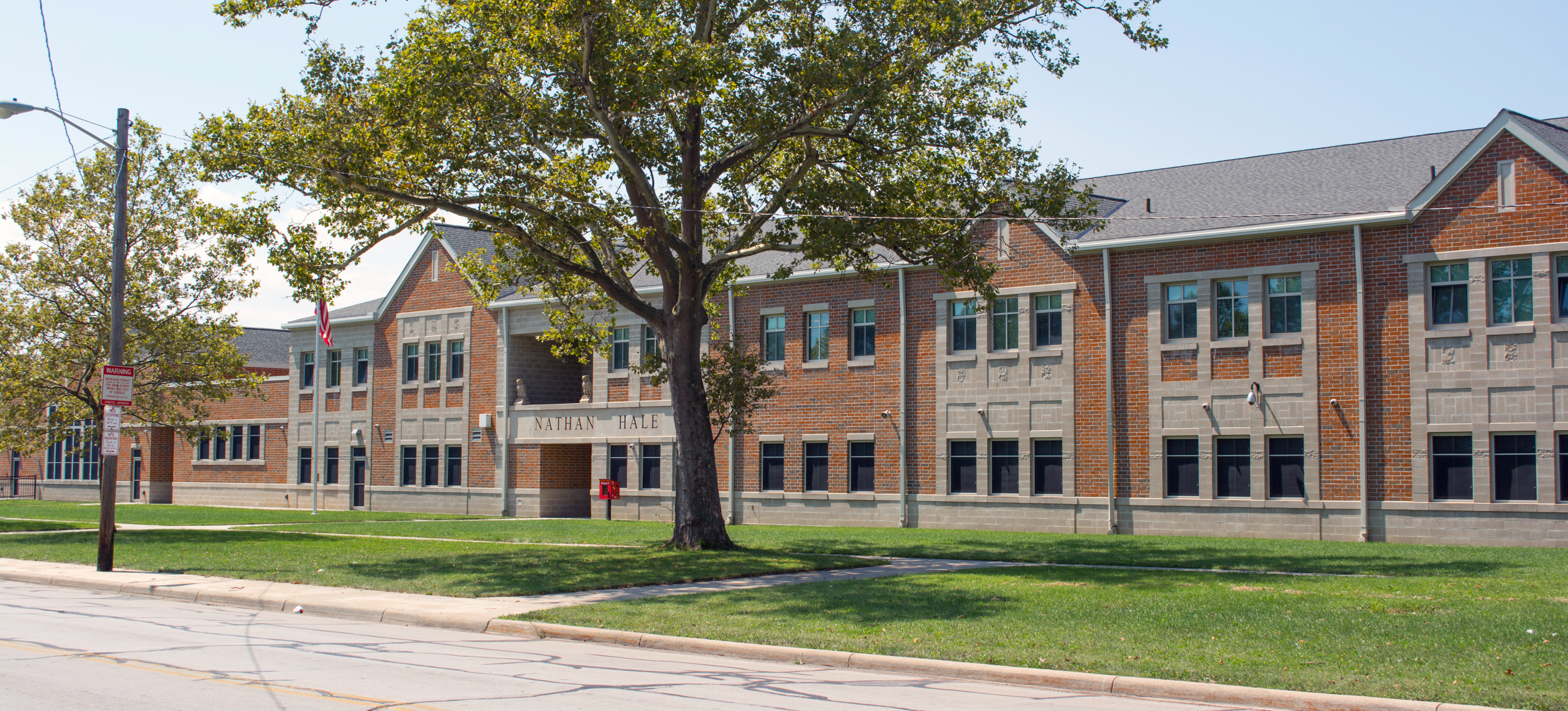
Nathan Hale School

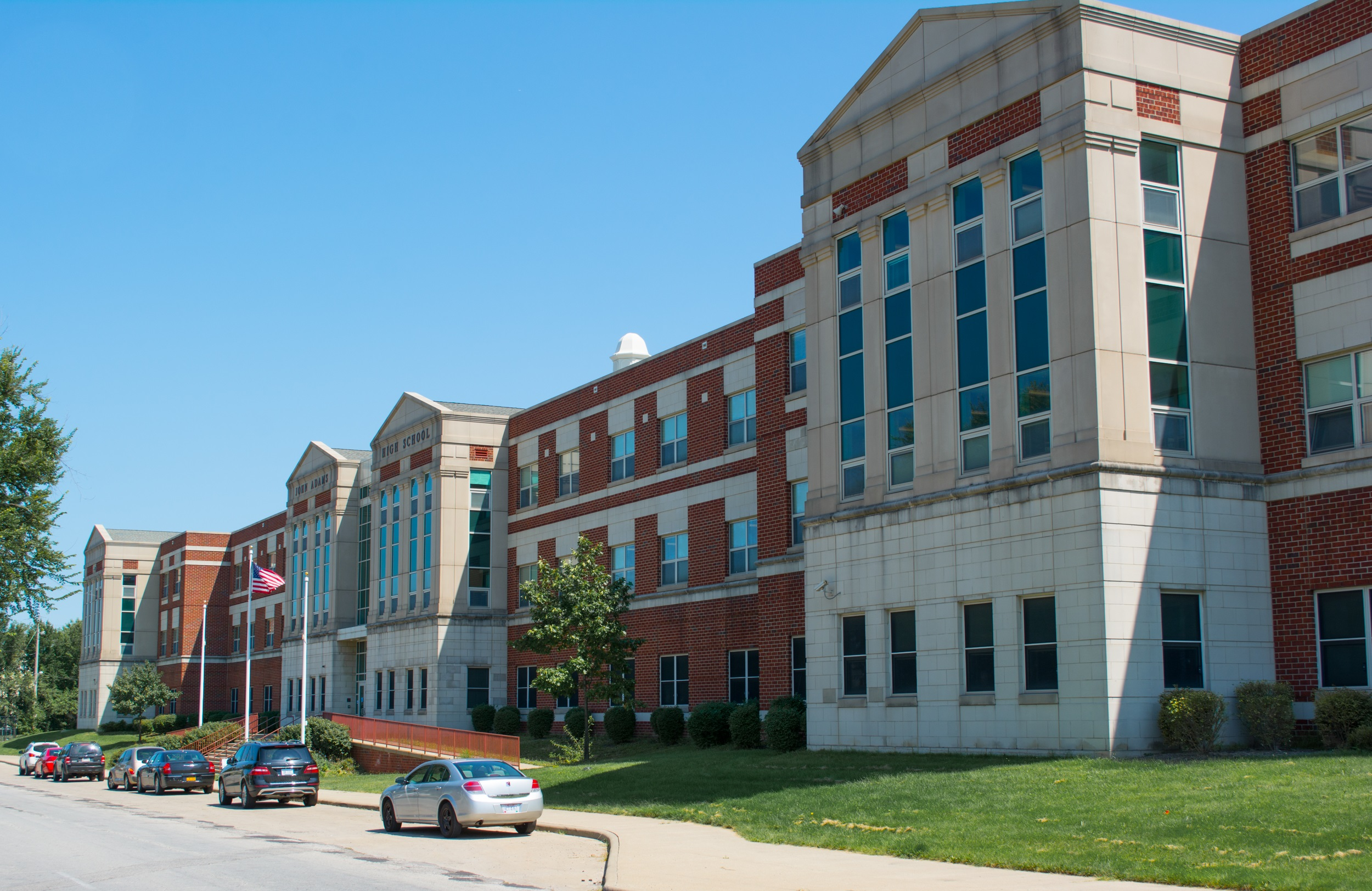
John Adams High School

The decline of the Union–Miles Park neighborhood slackened in the first decade of the 21st century as the area's population rose significantly from just 15,464 in 2000 to 19,004 in 2010 (an increase of 22.9 percent).

Older congregations continued to close or move out of the city, replaced by new ones. Miles Park Presbyterian Church closed in 2000 and sold its building to New Life Missionary Baptist Church. Greater Zion Hill Baptist Church sold the St. Joseph Byzantine building and adjacent school to the House of Glory Church in 2002. House of Glory sold the church (but not the school) to Greater Tabernacle Church in 2010. Greater Tabernacle Church abandoned the structure at some point thereafter, and it was demolished in February 2016. St. Catherine Church merged with two other parishes on January 1, 2008, to form Holy Spirit Parish. The new congregation chose St. Timothy Church at 4341 E. 131st Street for its new home. St. Lawrence Church closed in June 2010.

Other changes in the area were more positive. The closed 1906 Miles Park library was rehabilitated in 2000 and turned over to the Union-Miles Neighborhood Development Corporation for use as its headquarters. An overlook, small park, and walking trail were completed at Mill Creek Falls in 2002 as well. Cleveland Metroparks and the Slavic Village Development Corp. spent $1.2 million ($2,100,000 in 2025 dollars) building observation decks and restoring a nearby 19th-century home (which was converted into the Mill Creek Falls Historic Center). Another $200,000 ($400,000 in 2025 dollars) were spent building a parking lot and adding a traffic light to improve vehicular access. Clean Ohio, a state open space preservation fund, provided another $650,000 to acquire an additional 3.5 acres (14,000 m^{2}) of land, which added green space, picnicking areas, and toilet facilities to the park. Mill Creek Falls Park opened on October 10, 2002. (Note: Planning to restore the trash-choked falls and provide safe public access to the site began in 1991. The plans received a significant boost in 1993 when the Zaremba Co., building a planned community of 217 homes on the site of the old Newburgh psychiatric hospital adjacent to the site, began working with Cleveland Metroparks to raise funds.) In December 2004, the city purchased the YMCA building at 11300 Miles Avenue and turned it into a public recreation center. It was named the Earle B. Turner Recreation Center, in honor of the retired Cleveland City Council member and then-clerk of the Cleveland municipal courts.

Schools in the area also received a boost. The Cleveland public school system embarked on a $1.5 billion ($2,685,000,000 in 2025 dollars) program of new construction and rehabilitation of the public schools in 2002. The 1969 Miles Park School was demolished, and a new $14 million ($23,900,000 in 2025 dollars) Miles Park School opened in August 2007. The Miles School was demolished in 2010 and a new school was built on the same site in 2015. The 1928 Nathan Hale School was also demolished, and a new Nathan Hale/Mt. Pleasant School built at the same site in 2010. Woodland Hills School closed in 2011, and the building sold for $275,000 ($400,000 in 2025 dollars) to Breakthrough, a charter school company, for use by its E Prep and Village Prep schools. Paul Revere elementary school closed in 2012.

The first high school to be built under the new program was John Adams High School. The school district had sold the old high school's site to the city in 1999, but repurchased it in 2003 for a new high school. The new $36.8 million ($58,800,000 in 2025 dollars) John Adams High School opened in the fall of 2006. Initially, John Adams hosted a single, traditional high school. In December 2016, however, the school district decided to dissolve the traditional high school housed by the building. In its place, the city established a Bard High School Early College, to open in the fall of 2017. The city did not yet say what other high school programming will occupy the structure. (Note: The Bard High School Early College is a joint effort by the Cleveland Metropolitan Public Schools and Bard College. The effort is funded in part by the Bill and Melinda Gates Foundation. The competitive school accepts allows students to earn a high school diploma and an Associate of Arts (AA) degree in four years. It was first established in Cleveland on the campus of Cleveland State University in 2002.)

=== Crime in the neighborhood ===
Although it has a reputation as a high-crime area, the crime rate in Union–Miles Park in 2004 was about the same as the city as a whole. The property crime (Note: Arson, auto theft, burglary, and larceny.) rate was slightly lower than the city average, and tended to be concentrated in the industrial district on the western edge of the neighborhood. The rate of assault, domestic violence, illegal possession of a firearm, and use of a firearm in a crime were also comparable to that of the city as a whole. Again, they were much higher (double the citywide average) in the western industrial area. Drug crimes (Note: These include possession as well as and trafficking.) were 45 percent higher in Union–Miles Park than in the city as a whole. Drug activity, however, was concentrated on eastern and western edges of the area, rather than throughout the neighborhood. The violent crime (Note: Aggravated assault, homicide, rape, and robbery.) rate in Union–Miles Park was slightly higher than in the city as a whole. Within the neighborhood, violent crime rates varied considerably. In the area along E. 116th Street south of Union Avenue, it was much higher than the city as a whole. In many other areas of the neighborhood, it was substantially lower than the city as a whole.

=== Economy of the neighborhood ===
The industrial areas of the Union–Miles Park neighborhood are clustered primarily along the railroad tracks. As of 2004, roughly 30 medium to large manufacturing companies called the neighborhood home. Major industries included building materials manufacturing, chemical manufacturing, commercial laundries, coatings and varnish manufacturing, small foundries and metal-shaping operations, machine shops, roofing materials manufacturing, and warehouses. Many of these surviving industries have existed for two decades or more, and are family-owned. In 2004, there were 104 vacant or underutilized parcels in the Union–Miles Park industrial district. Although polluted properties were uncommon, most of the vacant/underutilized parcels have brownfield problems and are not ready for development.

Union–Miles Park no longer has any core retail areas. Little retail exists, and it is widely dispersed. As of 2004, there were about 1,400 vacant retail parcels in the neighborhood.

=== Economic and social geography of the neighborhood ===
The Union–Miles Park neighborhood is somewhat close to both downtown Cleveland and the University Circle arts and museum area, but the neighborhood is relatively isolated from both of them. The only major north–south road through the neighborhood is E. 93rd Street, which is in poor condition, does not extend to University Circle, and which has two active at-grade railroad crossings. Harvard, Miles, and Union Avenues, the major east–west roads, are in relatively good condition but provide no access to downtown. The many railroad lines also isolate the neighborhood from the surrounding city and suburbs. (Note: Historian Edmund H. Chapman points out that, as the railroads were being proposed in the 1850s and 1860s, no one could have anticipated the deleterious effects they would have as they criss-crossed the city, divided neighborhoods, and drove down property values. Railroad development was "chaotic", enthusiasm for the benefits very high, and the most convenient routes chosen.) Abandoning or changing the route of these rail lines, and eliminating the numerous at-grade crossings in the neighborhood, are not currently feasible.

Public transportation in Union–Miles Park consists solely of RTA bus lines which operate on Harvard Avenue, Miles Avenue, Union Avenue, Kinsman Road, E. 93rd Street, and E. 116th Street. There is no Rapid light rail station in the neighborhood. (Note: RTA once opereated the Lee-Harvard Community Circulator bus. This bus served the southeastern part of the neighborhood, giving residents access to the Lee-Harvard Shopping Center, Randall Park Mall, and other retail destinations. RTA canceled the circulator in 2009.)

== Notable residents and places ==
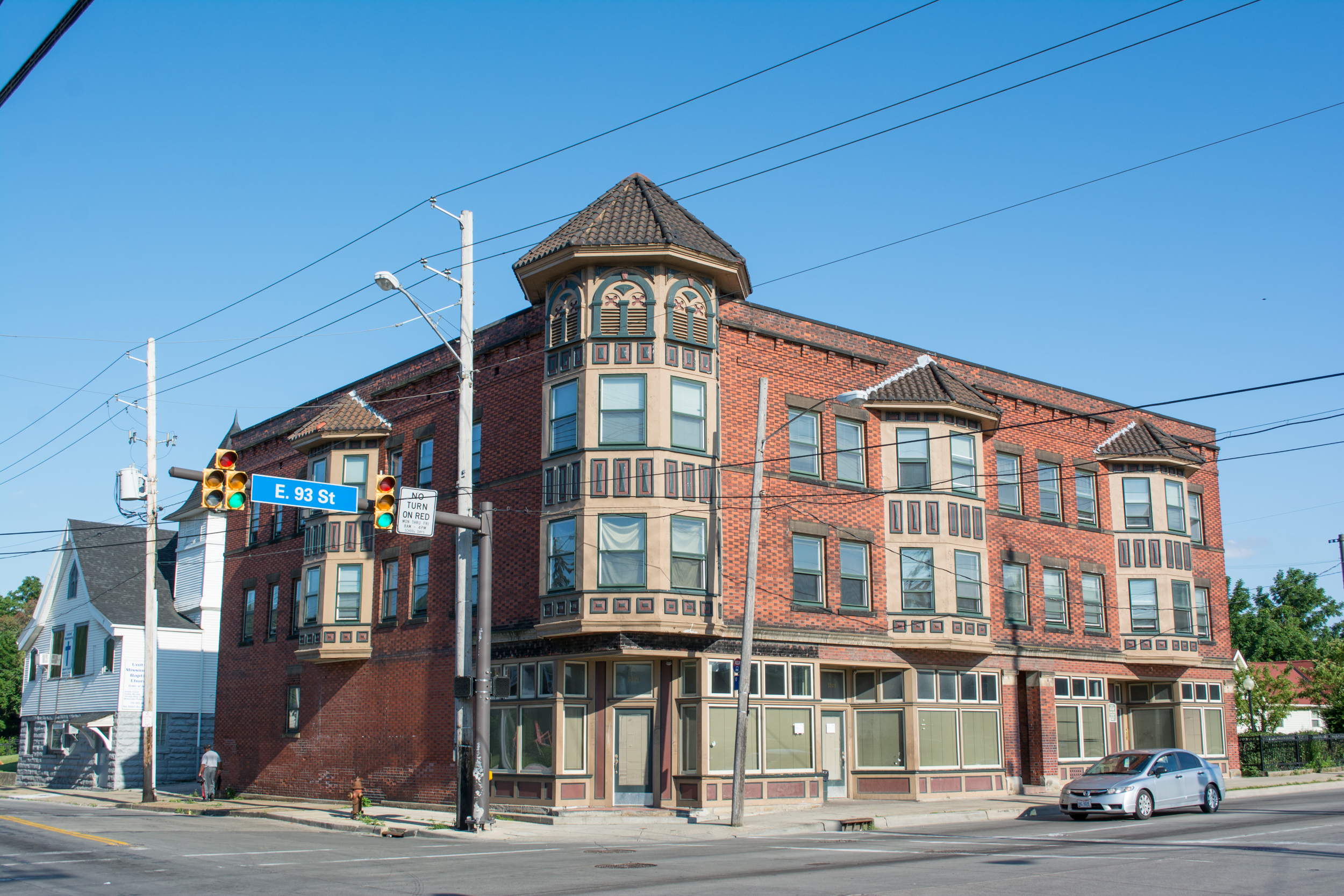
The Cermak Building, which opened in 1906, is an NRHP site within the Union–Miles Park neighborhood.

=== Notable people ===
Several notable individuals have either been born in what is now Union–Miles Park, or have lived there. These include:

- Thomas Coughlin (1876–1967), Cleveland City Council member; Ohio state legislator, and president of the Morris Plan Bank. He was born on Union Avenue between E. 98th and E. 103rd Streets.
- Harry L. Davis (1878–1950), mayor of Cleveland and governor of Ohio. He was born at 2240 Aetna Road.
- William R. Hopkins (1869–1961), city manager of Cleveland. His family lived on E. 91st Street between Loren and Saxe Avenues.
- Dr. John Toomey (1889–1950), expert on polio. He lived at Union and E. 80th Street.
- Robert Ward (1917–2013), composer. When he was born, his parents lived at 4157 E. 100th Street.

=== Notable places ===
Several notable structures and places exist in what is now Union–Miles Park. These include:

- Cermak Building, 3503 E. 93rd Street. Constructed in 1909, this mixed-use building served as the heart of the emerging Slovak neighborhood at Union Avenue and E. 93rd Street. The structure is listed on the National Register of Historic Places.
- Miles Park Historic District, centered on Miles Park Avenue between E. 91st and E. 93rd Streets. The district includes Miles Park (the former Newburgh village square), the 1907 Miles Park Library, the 1872 Miles Park Methodist Church, and the 1870 Miles Park Presbyterian Church. The district is listed on the National Register of Historic Places.

== Bibliography ==
- Ahlbrandt, Roger S.; Fruehan, Richard J.; Giarratani, Frank (1996). The Renaissance of American Steel: Lessons for Managers in Competitive Industries. New York: Oxford University Press. ISBN 9780195108286.
- Armstrong, Foster; Klein, Richard; Armstrong, Cara (1992). A Guide to Cleveland's Sacred Landmarks. Kent, Ohio: Kent State University Press. ISBN 9780873384544.
- Avery, Elroy McKendree (1918). A History of Cleveland and Its Environs: The Heart of New Connecticut. Volume 1. Chicago: Lewis Publishing Co.
- Avery, Elroy McKendree (1918). A History of Cleveland and Its Environs: The Heart of New Connecticut. Volume 3. Chicago: Lewis Publishing Co.
- Ayers, Edward L.; Gould, Lewis L.; Oshinsky, David M.; Soderland, Jean R. (2006). American Passages: A History of the United States. Boston, Mass.: Wadsworth/Cengage Learning. ISBN 9780618914067.
- Bittlingmayer, George (1994). "Did Antitrust Policy Cause the Great Merger Wave?". In McChesney, Fred S.; Shughart, William F. (eds.). The Causes and Consequences of Antitrust: The Public Choice Perspective. Chicago: University of Chicago Press. ISBN 9780226556345.
- British Iron Trade Association Commission (1902). American Industrial Conditions and Competition. London: Offices of the British Iron Trade Association.
- Camp, Mark J. (2007). Railroad Depots of Northeast Ohio. Charleston, S.C.: Arcadia Publishing. ISBN 9780738551159.
- Chapman, Edmund H. (1981). Cleveland: Village to Metropolis. Cleveland: Western Reserve Historical Society. ISBN 0911704299.
- The Cleveland Directory for the Year Ending June, 1877. Cleveland: Cleveland Directory Company. 1876.
- The Cleveland Directory for the Year Ending June, 1879. Cleveland: Cleveland Directory Company. 1877.
- The Cleveland Directory for the Year Ending July, 1887. Cleveland: Cleveland Directory Company. 1886.
- The Cleveland Directory for the Year Ending July, 1894. Cleveland: Cleveland Directory Company. 1893.
- The Cleveland Directory for the Year Ending August, 1917. Cleveland: Cleveland Directory Company. 1916.
- Cleveland Engineering Society (1893). Visitors' Directory to the Engineering Works and Industries of Cleveland, Ohio. Cleveland: Cleveland Engineering Society.
- Cleveland Foundation (1924). The Cleveland Year Book, 1924. Cleveland: The Doyle & Waltz Printing Co.
- Cleveland Hospital Council (1922). The Cleveland Hospital and Health Survey. Cleveland: Cleveland Hospital Council.
- Cleveland Public Schools (1910). Seventy-Fourth Annual Report of the Board of Education for the School Year Ending August 31, 1910 (Report). Cleveland: Cleveland Board of Education.
- Cleveland Public Schools (1926). Annual Report of the Board of Education for the School Year Ending August 31, 1926 (Report). Cleveland: Cleveland Board of Education.
- "The Cleveland Short Line Railway". The Railway Age. December 20, 1907. pp. 875, 877.
- Cristy, A. B. (1896). Cleveland Congregationalists 1895: Historical Sketches of Our Twenty-Five Churches and Missions and Their Work in Missions. Cleveland: Williams Publishing and Electric Co.
- Daniels, Douglas Henry (2009). "Urbanization". In Finkelman, Paul (ed.). Encyclopedia of African American History, 1896 to the Present: From the Age of Segregation to the Twenty-First Century. Volume 5: U to Y. Oxford: Oxford University Press. ISBN 9780195167795.
- Dawson, Virginia P. (1999). Lincoln Electric: A History. Cleveland: Lincoln Electric Co.
- Garrad, Charles (2014). Petun to Wyandot: The Ontario Petun From the Sixteenth Century. Gatineau, Quebec: Canadian Museum of History. ISBN 9780776621449.
- Gregor, Sharon E. (2010). Rockefeller's Cleveland. Charleston, S.C.: Arcadia Publishing. ISBN 9780738577111.
- Gregory, James N. (2009). "The Second Great Migration: A Historical Overview". In Kusmer, Kenneth L.; Trotter, Joe William (eds.). African American Urban History Since World War II. Chicago: University of Chicago Press. ISBN 9780226465098.
- Hadden, Jeffrey K.; Masotti, Louis H. (1973). The Urbanization of the Suburbs. Beverly Hills, Calif.: Sage Publications.
- Haydu, Jeffrey (1997). Making American Industry Safe for Democracy: Comparative Perspectives on the State and Employee Representation in the Era of World War I. Urbana, Ill.: University of Illinois Press. ISBN 9780252066283.
- Houck, George Francis (1890). The Church in Northern Ohio and in the Diocese of Cleveland: From 1749 to 1890 (4 ed.). Cleveland: Short & Forman, Printers.
- Huddleston, Eugene L. (2002). Uncle Sam's Locomotives: The USRA and the Nation's Railroads. Bloomington, Ind.: Indiana University Press. ISBN 9780253340863.
- Hurt, R. Douglas (1996). The Ohio Frontier: Crucible of the Old Northwest, 1720–1830. Bloomington, Ind.: Indiana University Press. ISBN 9780253212122.
- Hynes, Michael J. (1953). History of the Diocese of Cleveland: Origin and Growth, 1847–1952. Cleveland: Diocese of Cleveland.
- "The Iron and Steel Institute". Engineerings. November 25, 1904. pp. 709–713.
- Keating, W. Dennis; Krumholz, Norman; Metzger, John (1995). "Postpopulist Public-Private Partnerships". In Keating, W. Dennis; Krumholz, Norman; Perry, David C. (eds.). Cleveland: A Metropolitan Reader. Kent, Ohio: Kent State University Press. ISBN 9780873384926.
- Kennedy, J.H. (November 1885). "Early Railroad Interests of Cleveland". The National Magazine. pp. 26–42.
- Kerr, Daniel R. (2011). Derelict Paradise: Homelessness and Urban Development in Cleveland, Ohio. Amherst, Mass.: University of Massachusetts Press. ISBN 9781558498495.
- Kolt, Robert Paul (2009). Robert Ward's 'The Crucible': Creating an American Musical Nationalism. Lanham, Md.: Scarecrow Press. ISBN 9780810863507.
- Krejci, William G. (2015). Buried Beneath Cleveland: Lost Cemeteries of Cuyahoga County. Charleston, S.C.: The History Press. ISBN 9781467117722.
- Krumholz, Norman (2012). "The Kerner Commission Twenty Years Later". In Galster, George C.; Hill, Edward W. (eds.). The Metropolis in Black and White: Place, Power, and Polarization. New Brunswick, N.J.: Transaction Publishers. ISBN 9780882851396.
- Kusmer, Kenneth L. (1976). A Ghetto Takes Shape: Black Cleveland, 1870–1930. Urbana, Ill.: University of Illinois Press. ISBN 9780252002892.
- "The Latest Thin-Lined Blast Furnace". The Iron Age. February 1, 1912. pp. 287–292.
- Leading Manufacturers and Merchants of the City of Cleveland and Environs: A Half Century's Progress. Boston: International Publishing Co. 1886.
- Leahy, Todd; Wilson, Nathan (2016). Historical Dictionary of Native American Movements. Lanham, Md.: Rowman & Littlefield. ISBN 9781442268081.
- Ledbetter, Eleanor Edwards (1919). The Czechs of Cleveland. Cleveland: Mayor's Advisory War Committee.
- Leitch, Jane Sutphin (2015). Sirius-ly Rich: A Tribute to the City of Cleveland, Ohio, the Brightest Star in the Northern Hemisphere. Morrisville, N.C.: Lulu. ISBN 9781483439723.
- Lowe, Jeffrey S. (2006). Rebuilding Communities the Public Trust Way: Community Foundation Assistance to CDCs, 1980–2000. Lanham, Md.: Lexington Books. ISBN 9780739111567.
- Lupold, Harry Forrest; Haddad, Gladys (1988). "Conquest and Settlement: Native Americans to New Englanders". In Lupold, Harry Forrest; Haddad, Gladys (eds.). Ohio's Western Reserve: A Regional Reader. Kent, Ohio: Kent State University Press. ISBN 9780873383639.
- MacKeigan, Judith A. (May 2011). "The Good People of Newburgh": Yankee Identity and Industrialization in a Cleveland Neighborhood, 1850–1992 (MA). Cleveland State University.
- Mangus, Michael; Hannan, Caryn; Herman, Jennifer L. (2008). Ohio Encyclopedia. Volume 1. Hamburg, Mich.: State History Publications. ISBN 9780742647626.
- Mendel, Stuart C. (2005). Mediating Organizations, Private Government, and Civil Society: Disinvestment Through the Preservation of Wealth in Cleveland, Ohio (1950–1990). Lewiston, N.Y.: Edwin Mellen Press. ISBN 9780773462335.
- Mewett, Alfred (1923). A Brief History of Troop A, 107th Regiment of Cavalry, Ohio National Guard. Cleveland: Veterans' Association.
- Michney, Todd (2017). Surrogate Suburbs: Black Upward Mobility and Neighborhood Change in Cleveland, 1900–1980. Chapel Hill, N.C.: University of North Carolina Press. ISBN 9781469631936.
- Miller, Carol Poh (October 1979). Central Furnaces, US Steel Corporation. HAER OH-12 (PDF) (Report). Washington, D.C.: Historic American Engineering Record, U.S. Department of Interior.
- Miller, Carol Poh; Wheeler, Robert A. (1997). Cleveland: A Concise History, 1796–1996. Bloomington, Ind.: Indiana University Press. ISBN 9780253211477.
- Mitchell, Sandy (2009). Cleveland's Slavic Village. Charleston, S.C.: Arcadia Publishing. ISBN 9780738560694.
- Moore, Leonard N. (2002). Carl B. Stokes and the Rise of Black Political Power. Urbana, Ill.: University of Illinois Press. ISBN 9780252027604.
- Myers, John; Cetina, Judith G. (2015). Irish Cleveland. Charleston, S.C.: Arcadia Publishing. ISBN 9781467113496.
- Ohio Commissioner of Railroads and Telegraphs (1881). Annual Report of the Commissioner of Railroads and Telegraphs of Ohio for the Year Ending June 30, 1880 (Report). Columbus, Ohio: G.J. Brand & Co., State Printers. hdl:2027/uc1.b2896935.
- Ohio Commissioner of Railroads and Telegraphs (1882). Annual Report of the Commissioner of Railroads and Telegraphs of Ohio for the Year Ending June 30, 1881 (Report). Columbus, Ohio: G.J. Brand & Co., State Printers.
- Ohio Commissioner of Railroads and Telegraphs (1887). Annual Report of the Commissioner of Railroads and Telegraphs of Ohio for the Year 1886 (Report). Columbus, Ohio: The Westbote Co., State Printers.
- Ohio Commissioner of Railroads and Telegraphs (1901). The Thirty-Third Annual Report of the Commissioner of Railroads and Telegraphs, to the Governor of the State Ohio, for the Year 1900 (Report). Columbus, Ohio: Fred J. Heer, State Printer.
- Ohio Division of Geological Survey (1884). Report of the Geological Survey of Ohio. Volume 5: Economic Survey (Report). Columbus, Ohio: J.G. Brand & Co., State Printers.
- Ohio Secretary of State (1858). Annual Report of the Ohio Secretary of State to the Governor for the Year 1857 (Report). Columbus, Ohio: Richard Nevins, State Printer.
- Ohio Secretary of State (1868). Annual Report of the Ohio Secretary of State to the Governor for the Year 1867 (Report). Columbus, Ohio: L.D. Myers & Bro., State Printers.
- Ohio Secretary of State (1882). Annual Report of the Ohio Secretary of State to the Governor for the Year 1882 (Report). Columbus, Ohio: Myers Brothers, State Printers.
- Orth, Samuel P. (1910). A History of Cleveland, Ohio. Volume 1. Chicago: S.J. Clarke Publishing.
- Orth, Samuel P. (1910). A History of Cleveland, Ohio. Volume 2. Chicago: S.J. Clarke Publishing.
- Orth, Samuel P. (1910). A History of Cleveland, Ohio. Volume 3. Chicago: S.J. Clarke Publishing.
- Poor, Henry V. (1915). Poor's Manual of the Railroads of the United States, 1915. New York: Poor's Railroad Manual Co. pp. 57 v. hdl:2027/mdp.39015039344240.
- Rasey, Keith P.; Keating, W. Dennis; Krumholz, Norman; Star, Philip D. (1991). "Management of Neighborhood Development: Community Development Corporations". In Bingham, Richard D. (ed.). Managing Local Government: Public Administration in Practice. Newbury Park, Calif.: Sage Publications. ISBN 9780803939387.
- Redmond, Brian G. (March 2006). Before the Western Reserve: An Archeological History of Northeast Ohio (PDF) (Report). Cleveland: Cleveland Museum of Natural History.
- Redmond, Brian G. (2009). "The South Park Village Site, Northeast Ohio: A Late Prehistoric Village". In McManamon, Francis P.; Cordell, Linda S.; Lightfoot, Kent G.; Milner, George R. (eds.). Archaeology in America: An Encyclopedia. Volume 1. Westport, Conn.: Greenwood Press. ISBN 9780313331848.
- Ricky, Donald B., ed. (1998). Encyclopedia of Ohio Indians. St. Clair Shores, Mich.: Somerset Publishers. ISBN 9780403094806.
- Rose, William Ganson (1990). Cleveland: The Making of a City. Kent, Ohio: Kent State University Press. ISBN 9780873384285.
- Sabol, John T.; Alzo, Lisa A. (2009). Cleveland Slovaks. Charleston, S.C.: Arcadia Publishing. ISBN 9780738552422.
- Sanders, Craig (2007). Akron Railroads. Charleston, S.C.: Arcadia Publishing. ISBN 9780738541419.
- Shetty, Sujata; Reid, Neil (2017). "The New Urban World: Challenges and Policy with Respect to Shrinking Cities". In Hannigan, John A.; Richards, Greg (eds.). The Sage Handbook of New Urban Studies. Los Angeles: Sage Publications. ISBN 9781412912655.
- Smith, Karen Manners; Koster, Tim (2008). Time It Was: American Stories From the Sixties. Upper Saddle River, N.J.: Pearson Prentice Hall. ISBN 9780131840775.
- Stephenson, Burt S. (January 1907). "Iron and Steel Making in Ohio". The Ohio Magazine: 64–72.
- Stilgoe, John R. (1988). Borderland: Origins of the American Suburb, 1820–1939. New Haven, Conn.: Yale University Press. ISBN 9780300042573.
- Stradling, David; Stradling, Richard (2015). Where the River Burned: Carl Stokes and the Struggle to Save Cleveland. Ithaca, N.Y.: Cornell University Press. ISBN 9780801453618.
- Swank, James Moore (1876). The Ironworks of the United States. Philadelphia: American Iron and Steel Association.
- Telgen, Diane (2005). "Major Entrepreneurs and Companies". In Hillstrom, Kevin; Hillstrom, Laurie Collier (eds.). The Industrial Revolution in America. Volume 1: Iron and Steel. Santa Barbara, Calif.: ABC-CLIO. ISBN 9781851096206.
- Thompson, David (2009). Railway Noise and Vibration: Mechanisms, Modelling and Means. Oxford, UK: Elsevier. ISBN 9780080451473.
- Toman, Jim; Hays, Blaine S. (1996). Horse Trails to Regional Rails: The Story of Public Transit in Greater Cleveland. Kent, Ohio: Kent State University Press. ISBN 9780873385473.
- Trowbridge, Percie A. (August 1894). "The Old Newburgh Library". The Open Shelf: 235–240.
- Union Miles Development Corporation; Urban Design Center of Northeast Ohio (April 2004). Union Miles Neighborhood Master Plan (PDF) (Report). Cleveland: Union Miles Development Corporation.
- Upton, Harriet Taylor (1910). History of the Western Reserve. Volume 1. Chicago: The Lewis Publishing Co.
- Vail, H.L.; Snyder, L.M. (1890). Ordinances of the City of Cleveland. Revised and Consolidated. Cleveland: Clark-Britton Printing Co.
- Van Tassel, David D.; Grabowski, John J. (1987). The Encyclopedia of Cleveland History. Bloomington, Ind.: Indiana University Press. ISBN 9780253313034.
- Van Tassel, David D.; Vacha, John (2005). 'Behind Bayonets': The Civil War in Northern Ohio. Kent, Ohio: Kent State University Press. ISBN 9780873388504.
- Vigil, Vicki Blum (2007). Cemeteries of Northeast Ohio: Stones, Symbols and Stories. Cleveland: Gray & Company. ISBN 9781598510256.
- Vigil, José F.; Pike, Richard J.; Howell, David G. (2000). A Tapestry of Time and Terrain. Pamphlet to accompany Geologic Investigations Series I–2720 (PDF) (Report). Washington, D.C.: U.S. Geological Survey.
- Waldman, Carl (2006). Encyclopedia of Native American Tribes. New York: Checkmark Books. ISBN 9780816062744.
- Warren, Kenneth (1989). The American Steel Industry, 1850–1970: A Geographical Interpretation. Pittsburgh: University of Pittsburgh Press. ISBN 9780822986027.
- Wellman-Seaver-Morgan Company (1901). Catalog, 1901. Cleveland: Wellman-Seaver engineering Company.
- Weiner, Ronald R. (2005). Lake Effects: A History of Urban Policy Making in Cleveland, 1825–1929. Columbus, Ohio: Ohio State University Press. ISBN 9780814209899.
- Whittlesey, Charles (1867). Early History of Cleveland. Cleveland: Fairbanks, Benedict, & Co., Printers.
- Wickham, Gertrude Van Rensselaer (1914). The Pioneer Families of Cleveland 1796–1840. Volume 1. Cleveland: Evangelical Publishing House.
- Wilson, William Julius (2012). The Declining Significance of Race: Blacks and Changing American Institutions. Chicago: University of Chicago Press. ISBN 9780226901411.
- Winslow, John D.; White, George W.; Webber, Earl E. (August 1953). Water Resources of Cuyahoga County, Ohio. Bulletin 26 (PDF) (Report). Columbus, Ohio: Division of Water, Department of Natural Resources.
