= Cleveland City Council =

City council of Cleveland, Ohio

Type
- Type: Unicameral

Leadership
- President: Blaine Griffin, Democratic since January 2022
- Majority Leader: Jasmin Santana, Democratic since January 2022
- Majority Whip: Charles Slife, Democratic since January 2026

Structure
- Seats: Total seats: 15
- Political groups: Democratic (15)

Elections
- Voting system: Single-member districts
- Last election: November 2025
- Next election: November 2029

Meeting place
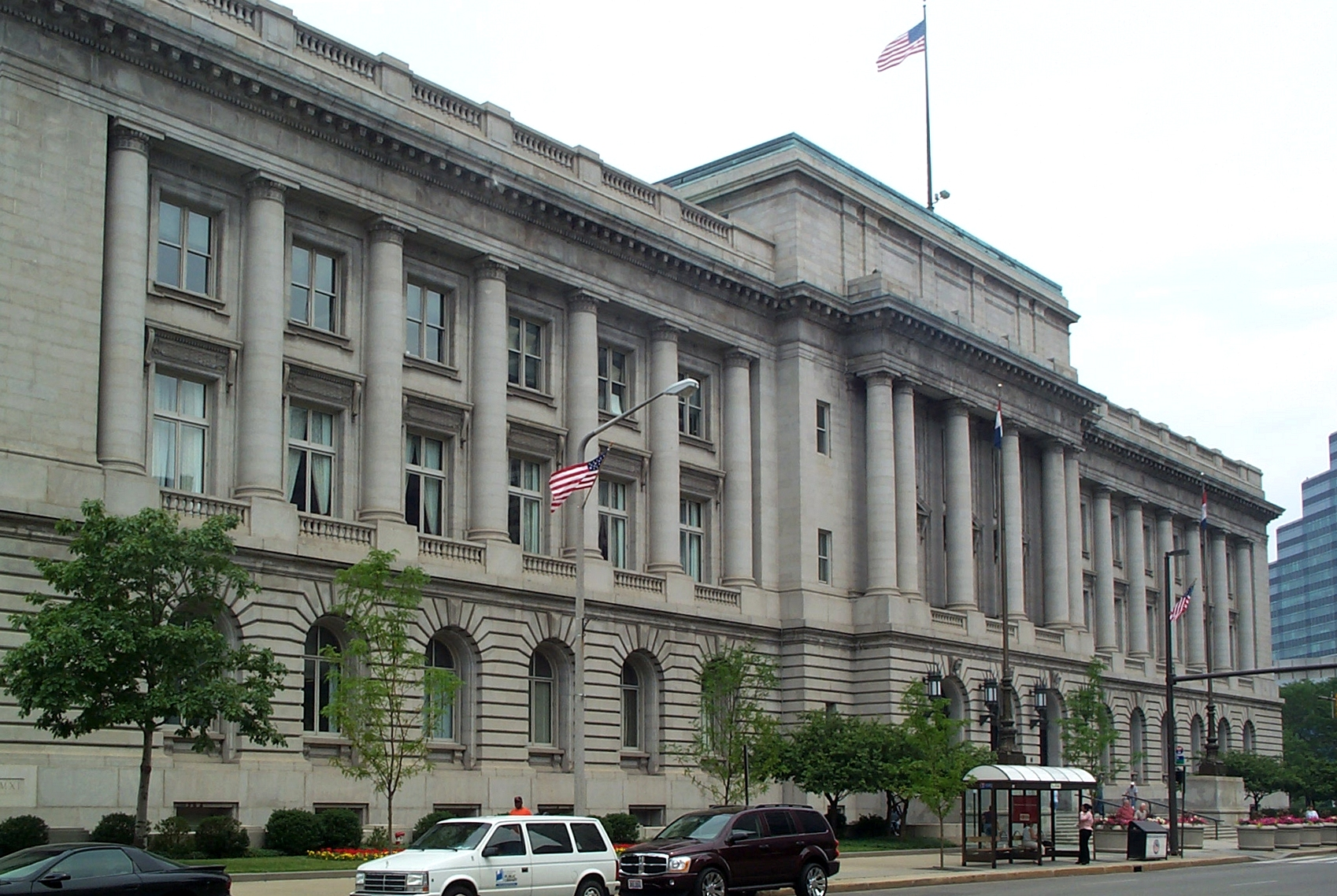
- Cleveland City Hall; 601 Lakeside Avenue, Room 220; Cleveland, OH 44114

Website
- Cleveland City Council Website

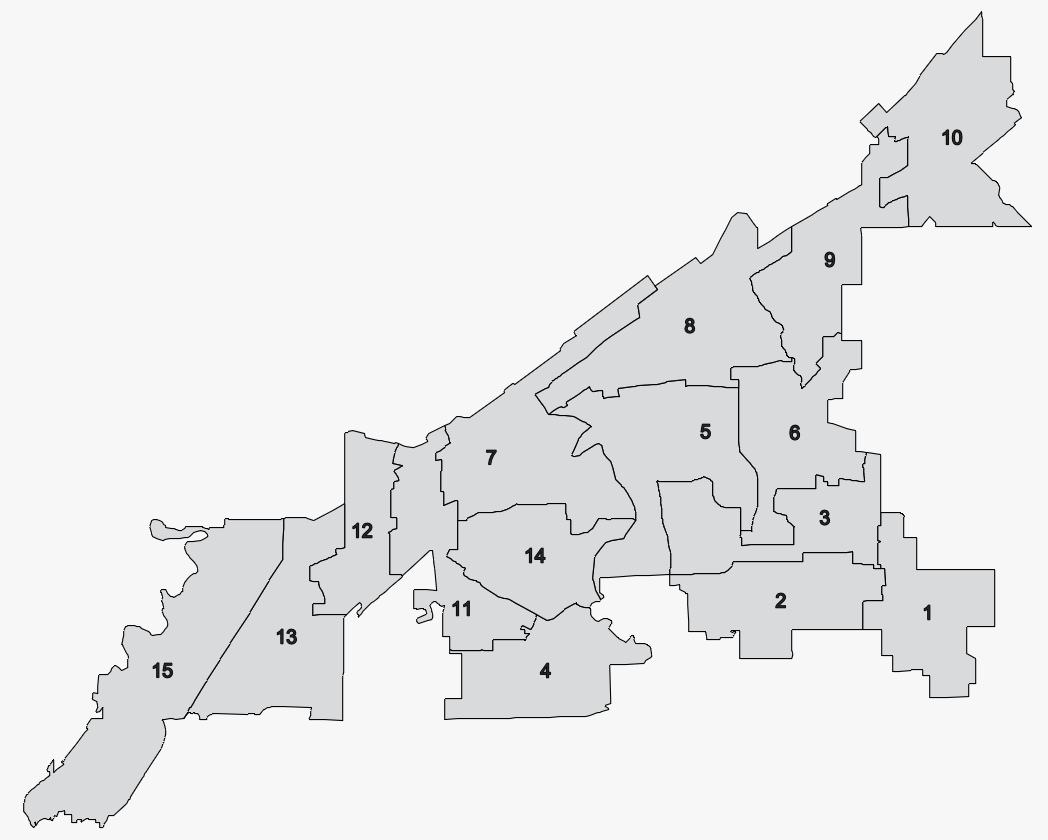
Map of the 15 wards of the City of Cleveland, in effect from 2026

Cleveland City Council is the legislative branch of government for the City of Cleveland, Ohio. Its chambers are located at Cleveland City Hall at 601 Lakeside Avenue, across the street from Public Auditorium in Downtown Cleveland. Cleveland City Council members are elected from 15 wards to four-year terms. In Cleveland's mayor–council (strong mayor) form of government, council acts as a check against the power of the city executive, the mayor. Its responsibilities include "monitoring city departments, approving budgets, and enacting legislation to improve the quality of life [for the citizens of the city]."

The current President of Council is Blaine Griffin. Following Councilman Kerry McCormack's resgination on October 3, Councilwoman Jasmin Santana became Majority Leader. Patricia Britt serves as the Clerk of Council.

== History ==
The structure and membership of city council have fluctuated throughout Cleveland's history. Established in 1802, it initially included three trustees, and when Cleveland was incorporated as a city in 1836, it had three aldermen. After the annexation of Ohio City in 1854, "the revised city council expanded to 11 wards, with 2 trustees elected from each," or 22 representatives in total. By 1885, the city's legislature had grown to 50 representatives. Cleveland's 1892 Federal Plan, which strengthened the powers of the mayor, reduced the size of council to 20 members, but after the plan was ruled unconstitutional by the Supreme Court of Ohio in 1902, council membership grew again to 32.

After gaining municipal home rule from the state in 1912, Cleveland's city government, led by Mayor Newton D. Baker, drafted a new municipal charter. In developing the charter, the size of council proved to be the most contentious issue. According to the Encyclopedia of Cleveland History, "those advocating a small council elected at large maintained that it would be more efficient, less expensive and would eliminate local machine corruption. Those who favored a large council elected by ward considered it more democratic, since it made councilmen answerable to their constituents."

The final charter adopted in 1913 introduced a system with 26 wards each represented by a single council member. Due to the city's continued expansion, council grew to 33 members by 1923, making it "second in size only to Chicago's 50-member council." In the 1920s, during the brief council–manager experiment, the number of council members was reduced to 25. When the mayor–council system was restored in 1931, the city had 33 council members again.

In November 1981, as part of Mayor George Voinovich's effort to streamline city government, Cleveland voters approved reducing council to 21 members. In November 2008, during the tenure of Mayor Frank G. Jackson, Cleveland voters passed a charter amendment linking the size of City Council to the city's population. City Council approved a redistricting plan in March 2009, reducing the number of wards to 19 at the start of the 2010–2013 term. Thereafter, the number of wards was tied to the population identified in the decennial United States Census.

Population decreases identified in the 2010 Census resulted in the elimination of two wards, reducing the number of members to 17. In March 2013, City Council approved new ward boundaries that went into effect in January 2014. Council voted to amend the boundaries on April 17, 2013. As a result of the 2020 Census, two additional wards were eliminated in November 2025, bringing the total number of wards to 15.

== Current council ==
The current members of Cleveland City Council—all from the Democratic Party—are listed below in the order of the ward they serve.

Ward	Neighborhoods	Council Member	In office since	Ward Map
1	Lee–Miles (Lee–Harvard and Lee–Seville), parts of Mount Pleasant and Union–Miles	Joe Jones	2017	Map
2	Union–Miles, parts of Broadway–Slavic Village	Kevin Bishop	2017	Map
3	Mount Pleasant, Buckeye–Shaker, Broadway–Slavic Village	Deborah Gray	2022	Map
4	Old Brooklyn	Kris Harsh	2022	Map
5	Central, Kinsman, parts of Downtown and Cuyahoga Valley	Richard Starr	2022	Map
6	Fairfax, University Circle, Buckeye–Woodhill, Little Italy	Blaine Griffin; President	2017	Map
7	Downtown, Ohio City, north Tremont, north Cuyahoga Valley (The Flats and Whiskey Island), parts of Detroit–Shoreway	Austin Davis	2026	Map
8	Goodrich–Kirtland Park, Asiatown, Hough, St. Clair–Superior, parts of Downtown, Glenville, and Midtown	Stephanie Howse-Jones	2022	Map
9	Glenville, Forest Hills, part of University Circle	Kevin Conwell	2001	Map
10	Collinwood, Euclid–Green	Michael Polensek	1977	Map
11	Detroit–Shoreway, parts of Edgewater, Cudell, West Boulevard, Brookside–Old Brooklyn	Nikki Hudson	2026	Map
12	Edgewater, Cudell, West Boulevard, parts of Jefferson	Tanmay Shah	2026	Map
13	West Park (Jefferson and Bellaire–Puritas)	Brian Kazy	2015	Map
14	Clark–Fulton, Brooklyn Centre, Stockyards, south Tremont	Jasmin Santana; Majority Whip	2017	Map
15	West Park (Kamm's Corners and Hopkins)	Charles Slife	2019	Map

== Committees ==
As of 2026, City Council has 11 standing committees.

Committee	Chair	Vice Chair
Development, Planning & Sustainability	Jasmin Santana	Kris Harsh
Finance, Diversity, Equity & Inclusion	Blaine Griffin	Jasmin Santana
Health, Human Services & the Arts	Kevin Conwell	Austin Davis
Mayor’s Appointments	Stephanie Howse-Jones	
Municipal Services & Properties	Kevin Bishop	Kris Harsh
Operations	Kris Harsh	
Rules	Blaine Griffin	
Safety	Michael Polensek	Richard Starr
Transportation & Mobility	Charles Slife	Joe Jones
Utilities	Brian Kazy	Deborah Gray
Workforce, Education, Training & Youth Development	Jasmin Santana	Stephanie Howse-Jones

== See also ==
- Mayor of Cleveland
- Cuyahoga County Council
