= 2025 Cleveland City Council election =

- November 2, 2021

15 seats on Cleveland City Council 8 seats needed for a majority
	Majority party
Party	Democratic
Last election	17
Seats won	15
Seat change	▼2

The 2025 Cleveland City Council election was held on November 4, 2025. The primary elections were held on September 9, 2025. All 15 seats on Cleveland City Council were up for election. Elections in Cleveland are officially nonpartisan, with the top two candidates from the primary election advancing to the general election, regardless of party. This was the first election held under new ward maps. City Council lost two seats due to population decline.

== Ward 1 ==
Primary election results
Party	Candidate	Votes	%
Nonpartisan	Joe Jones	1,087	60.52%
Nonpartisan	Juanita O. Brent	544	30.29%
Nonpartisan	Lesa Jones Dollar	69	3.84%
Nonpartisan	Aylwin S. Bridges	48	2.67%
Nonpartisan	Marc G. Crosby	48	2.67%
Total votes		1,796	100.00

General election results
Party	Candidate	Votes	%
Nonpartisan	Joe Jones	2,414	63.01%
Nonpartisan	Juanita O. Brent	1,417	36.99%
Total votes		3,831	100.00

== Ward 2 ==
General election results
Party	Candidate	Votes	%
Nonpartisan	Kevin L. Bishop	2,038	100%
Total votes		2,038	100.00

== Ward 3 ==
Primary election results
Party	Candidate	Votes	%
Nonpartisan	Deborah G. Gray	662	72.83%
Nonpartisan	Erich V. Stubbs	133	14.63%
Nonpartisan	Sharon M. Spruill	144	12.54%
Total votes		909	100.00

General election results
Party	Candidate	Votes	%
Nonpartisan	Deborah A. Gray	2,152	80.36%
Nonpartisan	Erich V. Stubbs	501	18.71%
Write-in		25	0.93%
Total votes		3,831	100.00

== Ward 4 ==
General election results
Party	Candidate	Votes	%
Nonpartisan	Kris Harsh	2,309	70.55%
Nonpartisan	Rehan Waheed	942	28.78%
Write-in		22	0.67%
Total votes		3,273	100.00

== Ward 5 ==
Primary election results
Party	Candidate	Votes	%
Nonpartisan	Richard A. Starr	657	70.34%
Nonpartisan	Rebecca Maurer	230	24.63%
Nonpartisan	Beverly Owens-Jackson	47	5.03%
Total votes		934	100.00

General election results
Party	Candidate	Votes	%
Nonpartisan	Richard A. Starr	1,157	64.28%
Nonpartisan	Rebecca Maurer	633	35.17%
Total votes		3,831	100.00

== Ward 6 ==
General election results
Party	Candidate	Votes	%
Nonpartisan	Blaine A. Griffin	2,254	100%
Total votes		3,831	100.00

== Ward 7 ==
Primary election results
Party	Candidate	Votes	%
Nonpartisan	Austin N. Davis	961	55.90%
Nonpartisan	Mohammed Faraj	572	33.28%
Nonpartisan	Mike Rogalski	186	10.82%
Total votes		1,719	100.00

General election results
Party	Candidate	Votes	%
Nonpartisan	Austin N. Davis	2,536	58.87%
Nonpartisan	Mohammed Faraj	1,772	41.13%
Total votes		4,308	100.00

== Ward 8 ==
Primary election results
Party	Candidate	Votes	%
Nonpartisan	Stephanie Howse-Jones	568	62.56%
Nonpartisan	Charlotte Perkins	172	18.94%
Nonpartisan	Teri Ying-Liang Wang	149	16.41%
Nonpartisan	Leon Meredith	12	1.32%
Write-in		7	0.77%
Total votes		3,221	100.00

General election results
Party	Candidate	Votes	%
Nonpartisan	Stephanie Howse-Jones	1,599	75.07%
Nonpartisan	Charlotte Perkins	531	24.93%
Total votes		2,130	100.00

== Ward 9 ==
Primary election results
Party	Candidate	Votes	%
Nonpartisan	Kevin Conwell	956	76.11%
Nonpartisan	Alana Belle	228	18.15%
Nonpartisan	Tony Evans Jr	72	5.73%
Total votes		1,256	100.00

General election results
Party	Candidate	Votes	%
Nonpartisan	Kevin Conwell	2,267	76.46%
Nonpartisan	Alana Belle	678	22.87%
Write-in		20	0.67%
Total votes		3,831	100.00

== Ward 10 ==
General election results
Party	Candidate	Votes	%
Nonpartisan	Michael D. Polensek	2,787	67.79%
Nonpartisan	Anthony T. Hairston	1,318	32.06%
Write-in		6	0.15%
Total votes		4,111	100.00

== Ward 11 ==
General election results
Party	Candidate	Votes	%
Nonpartisan	Nikki Hudson	1,650	86.48%
Nonpartisan	Andrew Fontanarosa	258	13.52%
Total votes		3,831	100.00

== Ward 12 ==
Primary election results
Party	Candidate	Votes	%
Nonpartisan	Danny Kelly	680	49.38%
Nonpartisan	Tanmay Shah	427	31.01%
Nonpartisan	Andrew DeFratis	270	19.61%
Total votes		1,377	100.00

General election results
Party	Candidate	Votes	%
Nonpartisan	Tanmay Shah	1,463	50.12%
Nonpartisan	Danny Kelly	1,456	49.88%
Total votes		2,919	100.00

== Ward 13 ==
General election results
Party	Candidate	Votes	%
Nonpartisan	Brian Kazy	2,057	93.63%
Write-in		140	6.37%
Total votes		2,197	100.00

== Ward 14 ==
General election results
Party	Candidate	Votes	%
Nonpartisan	Jasmin Santana	1,073	100%
Total votes		1,073	100.00

== Ward 15 ==
General election results
Party	Candidate	Votes	%
Nonpartisan	Charles J. Slife	3,866	96.94%
Write-in		122	3.06%
Total votes		3,988	100.00
