= Mount Pleasant, Cleveland =

Neighborhood of Cleveland, Ohio, United States

Mount Pleasant
- Neighborhood of Cleveland
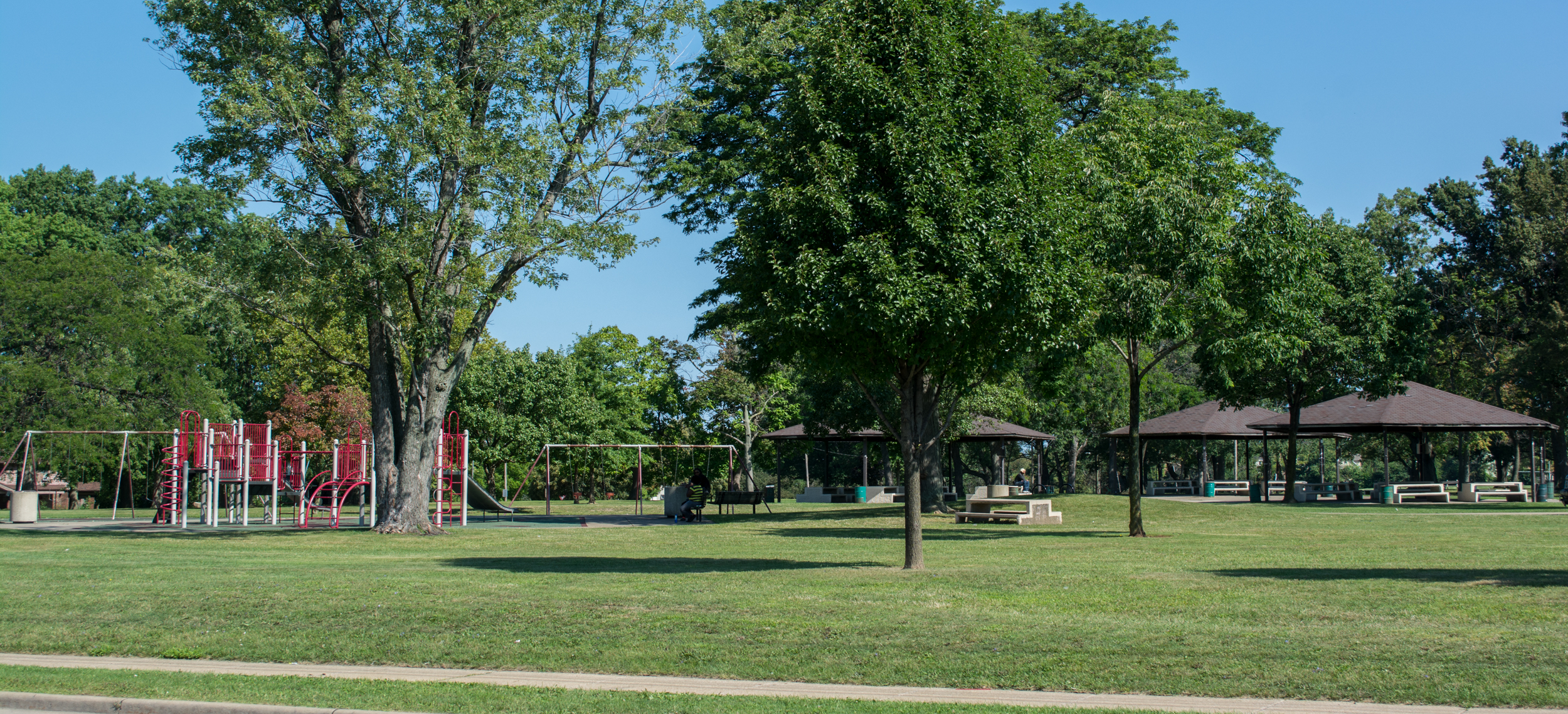
- Luke Easter Park in Mount Pleasant

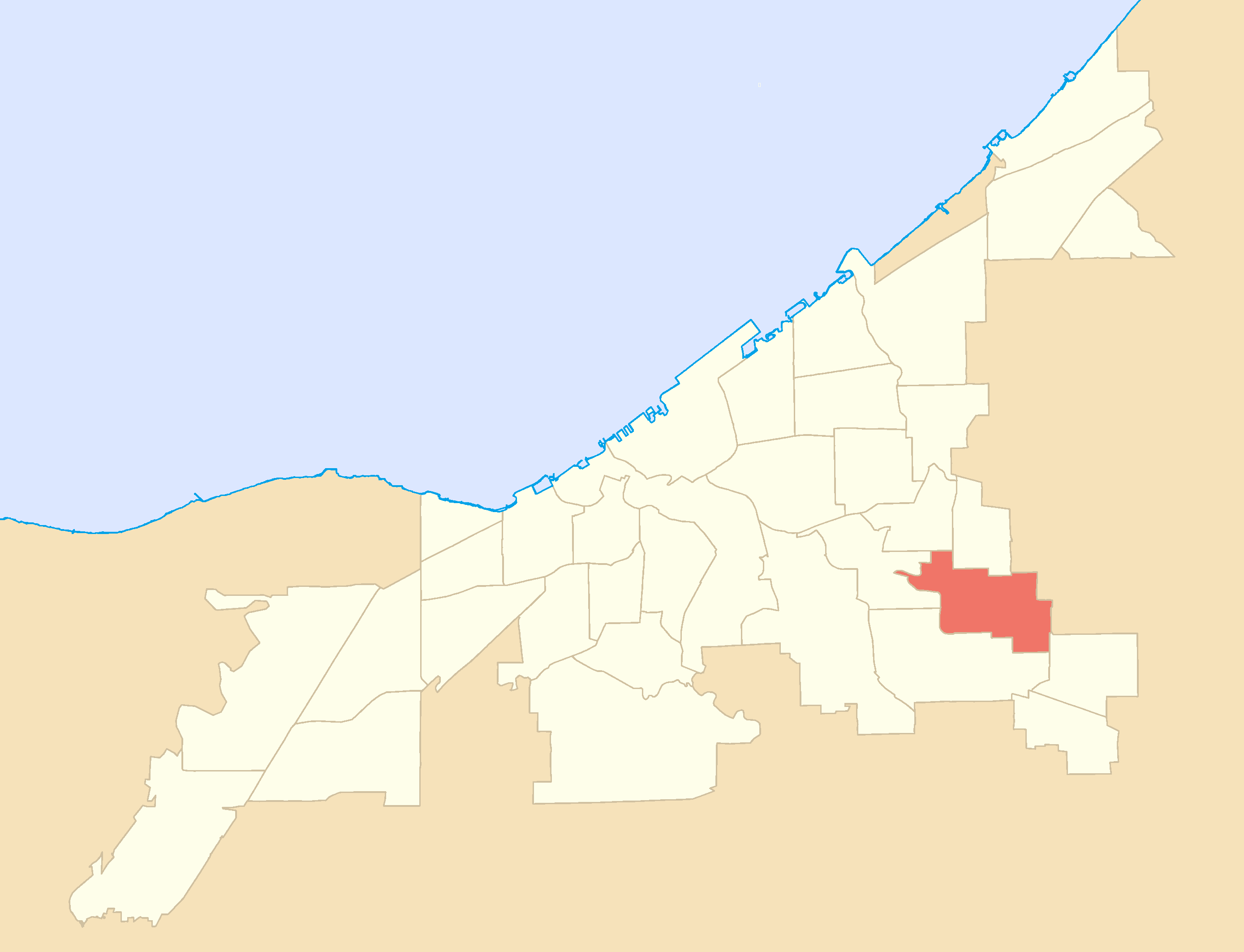
- Coordinates: 41°27′47″N 81°36′28″W
- Country: United States
- State: Ohio
- County: Cuyahoga County
- City: Cleveland

Population (2020)
  - Total: 15,059

Demographics
  - White: 2%
  - Black: 95.3%
  - Hispanic (of any race): 1.4%
  - Asian and Pacific Islander: 0.2%
  - Mixed and Other: 2.5%
- Time zone: UTC-5 (EST)
  - Summer (DST): UTC-4 (EDT)
- ZIP Codes: 44104, 44105, 44120, 44128
- Area code: 216
- Median income: $28,087
- Source: 2020 U.S. Census

Mount Pleasant is a neighborhood on the East Side of Cleveland, Ohio, United States. It borders the neighborhoods of Buckeye–Shaker and Buckeye–Woodhill to the north, Kinsman to the west, Union–Miles Park to the south, and the suburb of Shaker Heights and the Lee–Harvard neighborhood of Cleveland's Lee–Miles area to the east. The neighborhood has been home to numerous ethnic groups, first Manx immigrants, then Germans, Czechs, Russians, Jews, and Italians. Today, it is a predominantly African American neighborhood. Together with Buckeye–Shaker, it is politically part of Cleveland's Ward 4.
