= Euclid–Green =

Neighborhood of Cleveland, Ohio, United States

- Neighborhood of Cleveland
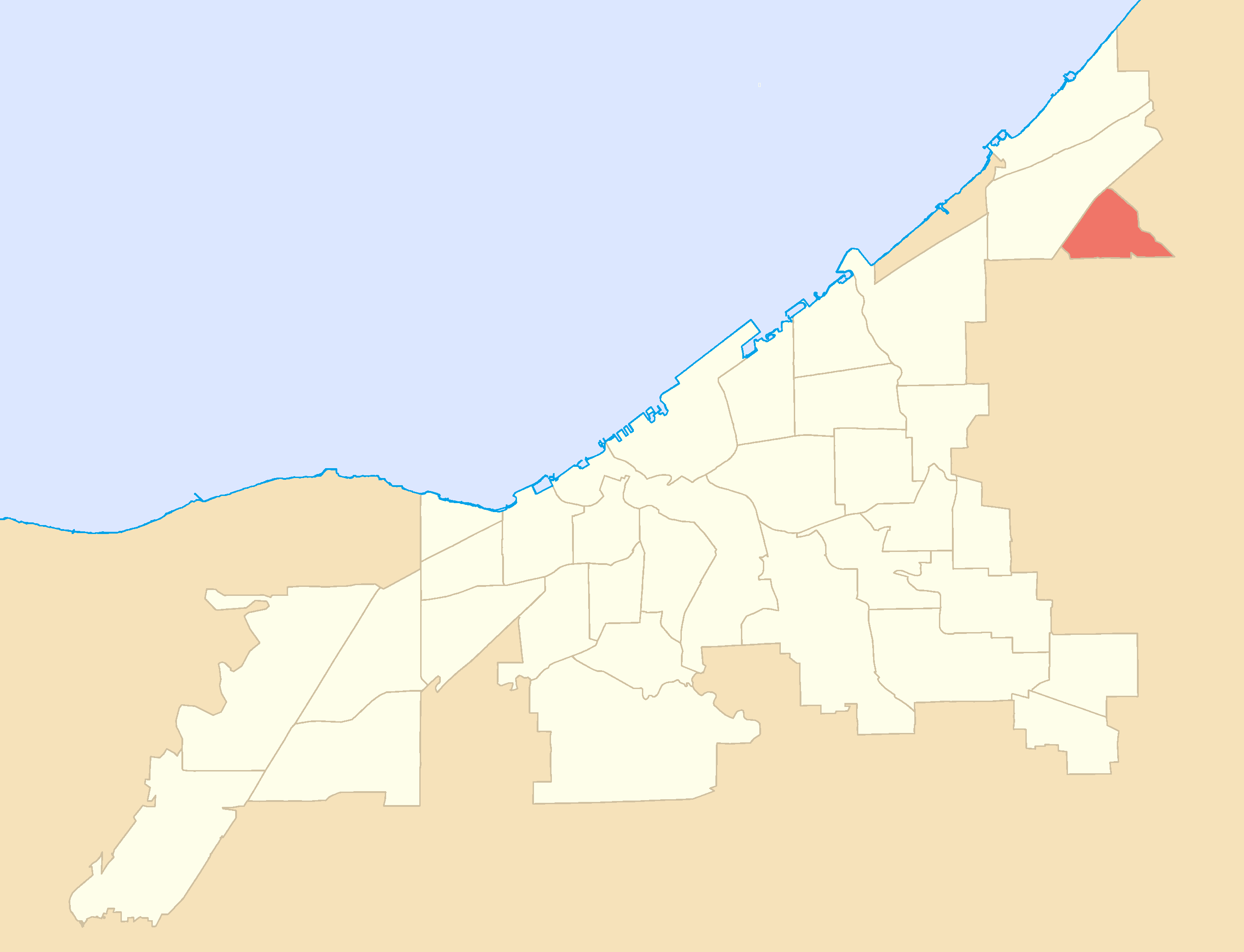
- Coordinates: 41°33′06″N 81°33′11″W
- Country: United States
- State: Ohio
- County: Cuyahoga County
- City: Cleveland
- Neighborhoods: list

Population (2020)
  - Total: 5,210

Demographics
  - White: 6.8%
  - Black: 86.5%
  - Hispanic (of any race): 1.2%
  - Asian and Pacific Islander: 1.6%
  - Mixed and Other: 5.1%
- Time zone: UTC-5 (EST)
  - Summer (DST): UTC-4 (EDT)
- ZIP Codes: 44112, 44121
- Area code: 216
- Median income: $25,955
- Source: 2020 U.S. Census

Euclid–Green is a neighborhood on the Northeast side of Cleveland, Ohio. It is "shaped somewhat like an isosceles triangle" and is bounded by the neighborhood of Collinwood–Nottingham to the northwest, the suburb of Euclid to the northeast, and the suburbs of South Euclid, Cleveland Heights, and East Cleveland to the south.

Together with Collinwood–Nottingham, Euclid–Green is politically part of Cleveland's Ward 10. Originally part of the Euclid Township and later the Village of Euclid, it was incorporated into Cleveland in 1926. Demographically, the mostly residential neighborhood is predominantly African American. Local parks include Belvoir Park, Duggan Park, Endora Park, and Groton Playground, and the Euclid Creek Reservation of the Cleveland Metroparks is located nearby.
