= Jay Westbrook =

American politician

Jay Westbrook (born 1947) is an American politician of the Democratic Party in Cleveland, Ohio. For 34 years, he was a member of Cleveland City Council representing wards on the west side of Cleveland. He was first elected to council in 1979 and served as its president from 1990 to 1999. Some of his political positions included being pro-gun control and pro-LGBT rights. He was also considered to be a consumer advocate, particularly with regard to health care. Westbrook retired from Council on December 31, 2013. Following retirement, he worked for the Thriving Communities program of the Western Reserve Land Conservancy starting in 2014.

Preceded by George L. Forbes	President of Cleveland City Council; 1990–1999	Succeeded by Michael D. Polensek
