= Brooklyn Centre =

Neighborhood of Cleveland, Ohio, United States

- Neighborhood of Cleveland
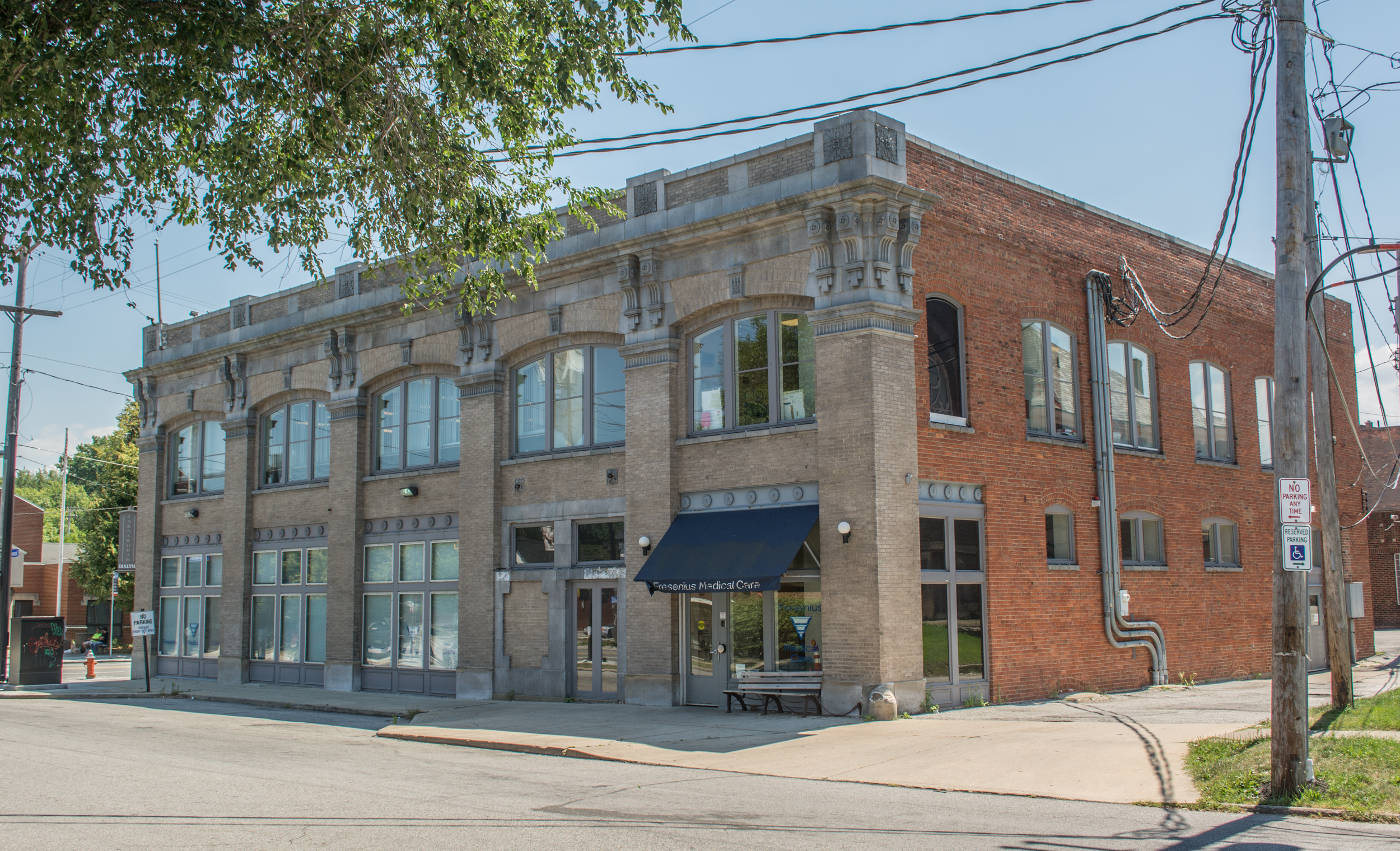
- Brooklyn Bank Building

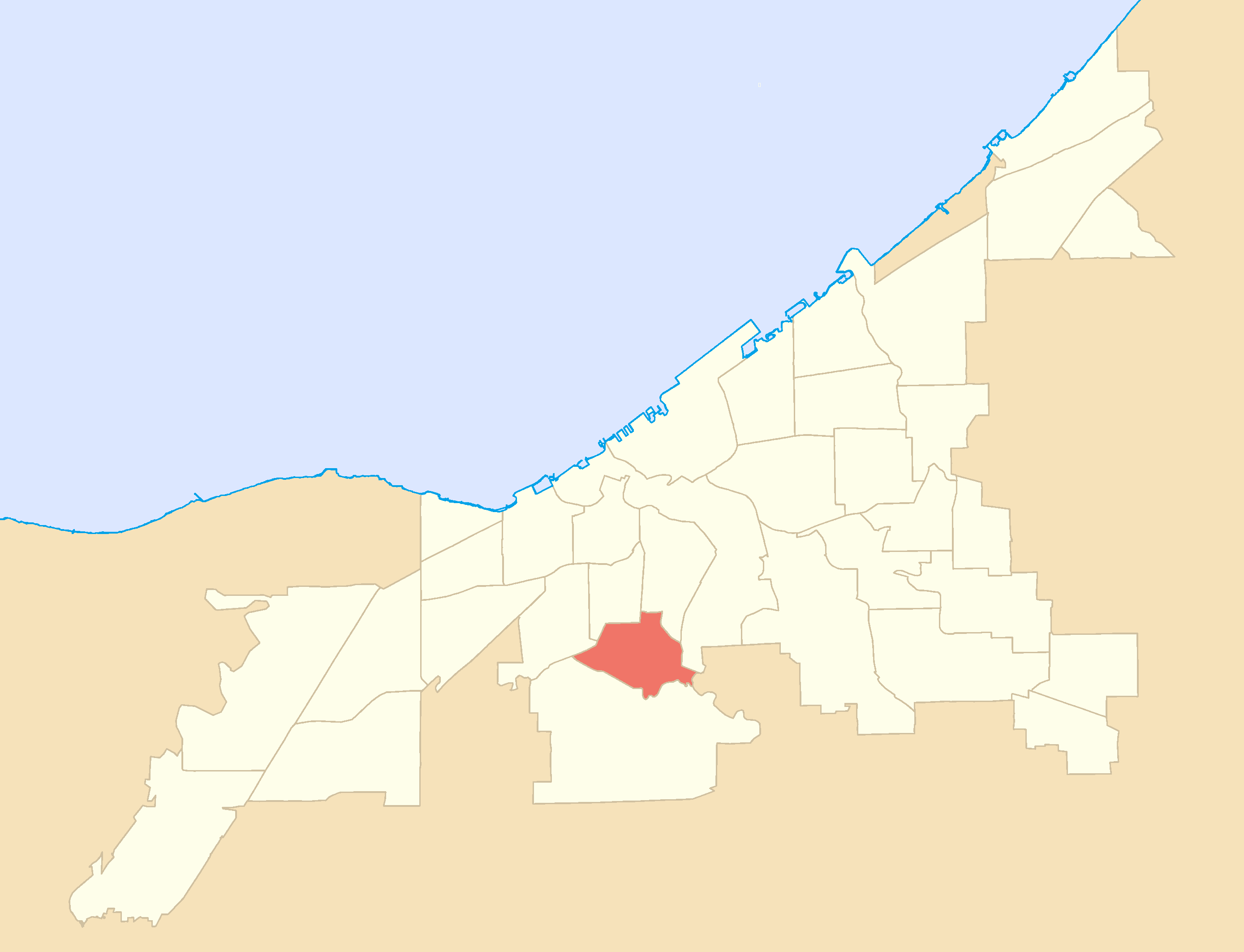
- Coordinates: 41°27′12″N 81°41′58″W
- Country: United States
- State: Ohio
- County: Cuyahoga County
- City: Cleveland

Population (2020)
  - Total: 9,392

Demographics
  - White: 61.1%
  - Black: 21.1%
  - Hispanic (of any race): 37.8%
  - Asian and Pacific Islander: 1.6%
  - Mixed and Other: 16.1%
- Time zone: UTC-5 (EST)
  - Summer (DST): UTC-4 (EDT)
- ZIP Codes: 44109
- Area code: 216
- Median income: $31,613
- Source: 2020 U.S. Census, City Planning Commission of Cleveland

Brooklyn Centre is a neighborhood on the West Side of Cleveland, Ohio. It borders Old Brooklyn to the south, Stockyards, Clark–Fulton, and Tremont to the north, and the Cuyahoga Valley and the suburb of Cuyahoga Heights to the east.

== History ==
Brooklyn Centre was founded in 1812 by James Fish and became the first settlement west of the Cuyahoga River. Two years later, around 200 people lived at Brooklyn Centre. By 1812, Brooklyn Centre became a township. In the early 1960s, the neighborhood was changed dramatically with the construction of I-71. Entire streets were lost and new cul-de-sacs and dead ends were created, changing the fabric of the neighborhood. In 1984, the City of Cleveland created the Brooklyn Centre Historic District, recognizing the location's historic and architectural importance.

In November 2004, The Brooklyn Centre Historical Society published Reflections from Brooklyn Centre: Presentations and Oral Histories from The Brooklyn Centre Historical Society. In November 2008, Brooklyn Centre became a National Wildlife Federation registered Community Wildlife Habitat Site, and was among the first city neighborhoods to obtain the designation.

The eastern portion of Brooklyn Centre is known as Barbarowa. Brooklyn Centre is bordered on the east by the Cuyahoga River I-176/The Jennings Freeway. The west border is I-71. The border to the south is Big Creek which runs through the Cleveland Metroparks Zoo and is the largest tributary that flows into the Cuyahoga. The northern border is a city street named Trowbridge.

== Demographics ==
Brooklyn Centre was originally settled by residents from Connecticut who had purchased land from investors of the Connecticut Western Reserve. German immigrants arrived starting in the late 19th century, followed by Polish and Irish arrivals in the early 20th century. These new settlers relocated to the east end of the neighborhood so that they would be close to the factories in and around the Cuyahoga Valley such as the tanneries and steel mills.

Today, Brooklyn Centre is a diverse neighborhood, with a mixed population of ethnic Europeans, African Americans, and, most prominently, a growing Hispanic community, Puerto Rican and otherwise. In 2020, the composition of the neighborhood was 61.1% white, 21.1% African American, 1.6% Asian and Pacific Islander, and 16.1% mixed and other groups. Hispanics or Latinos of any race were 37.8% of the population. As of 2019, Brooklyn Centre had an estimated foreign-born population of 17.3%, with most being immigrants from Latin America (especially Guatemala, El Salvador, the Dominican Republic, and Mexico).
