= Collinwood =

Historical area of Cleveland, Ohio, United States

Coordinates: 41.558°N 81.569°W

- Neighborhood of Cleveland
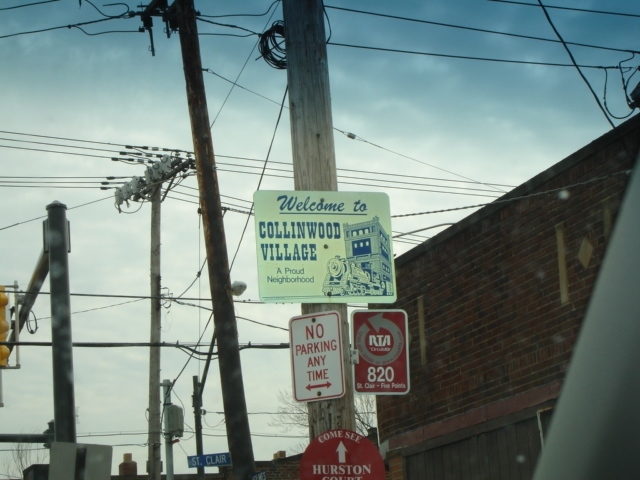

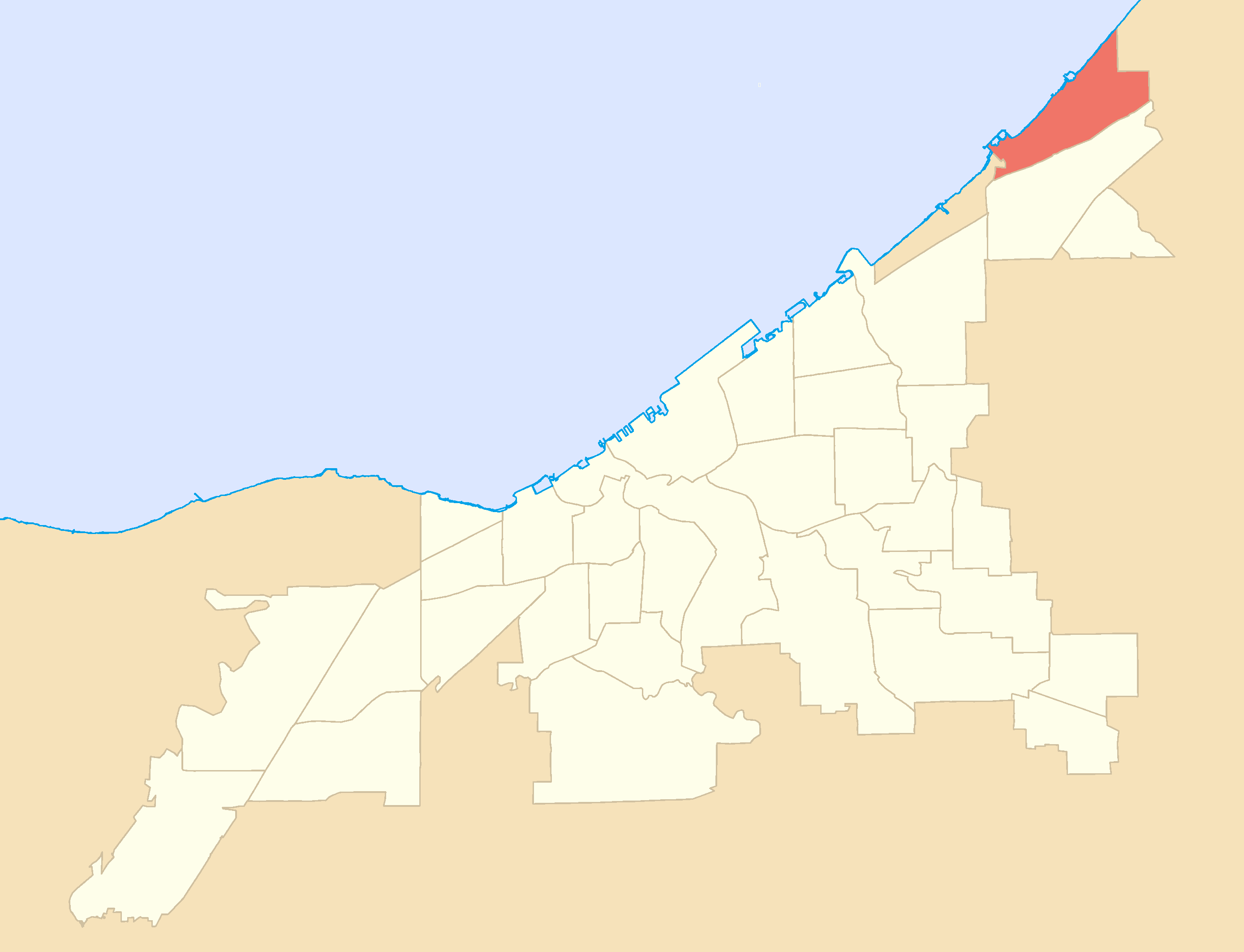

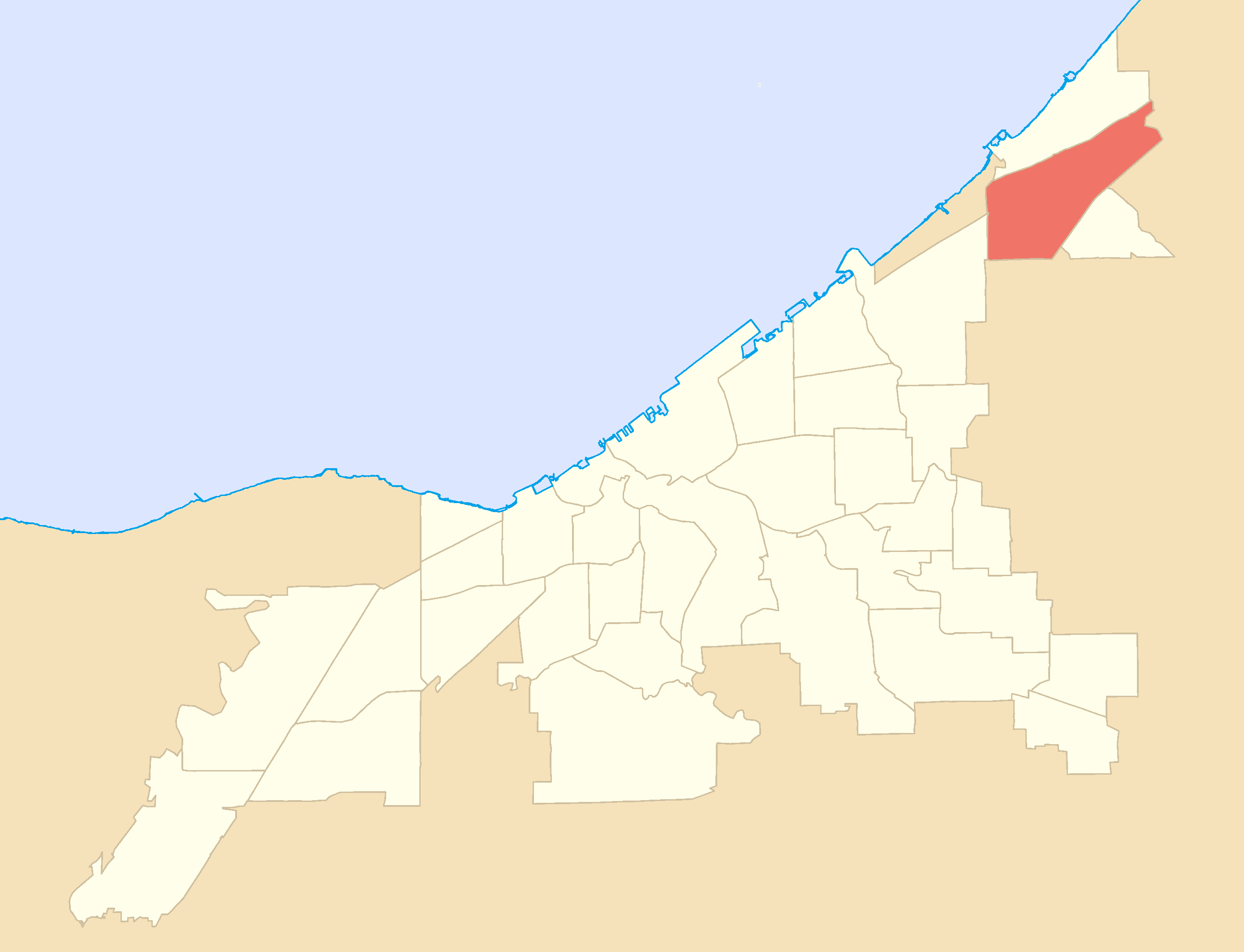
- Country: United States
- State: Ohio
- County: Cuyahoga
- City: Cleveland

Population (2020)
  - Total: 15,780 (North Shore Collinwood); 10,785 (Collinwood–Nottingham)

Demographics (North Shore Collinwood)
  - White: 29.9%
  - Black: 63%
  - Hispanic (of any race): 1.1%
  - Asian and Pacific Islander: 0.1%
  - Mixed and Other: 6.9%

Demographics (Collinwood–Nottingham)
  - White: 10.9%
  - Black: 84.2%
  - Hispanic (of any race): 1.4%
  - Asian and Pacific Islander: 0.4%
  - Mixed and Other: 4.6%
- Time zone: UTC-5 (EST)
  - Summer (DST): UTC-4 (EDT)
- ZIP Codes: 44110, 44119
- Area code: 216
- Median income: $27,935 (North Shore Collinwood) $26,404 (Collinwood–Nottingham)
- Source: 2020 U.S. Census, City Planning Commission of Cleveland.

Collinwood is a historical area in the northeast part of Cleveland, Ohio. Originally a village in Euclid Township, it was annexed by the city in 1910. Collinwood grew around the rail yards of the Lake Shore and Michigan Southern Railway (now CSX) and is divided by these same tracks into the neighborhoods of North Shore Collinwood and Collinwood–Nottingham. Collinwood was identified as one of America's Best Secret Neighborhoods by Travel + Leisure in 2008.

== History ==
The neighborhood's most infamous incident antedates its annexation by Cleveland. On Ash Wednesday, March 4, 1908, Collinwood was the site of an event known as the Collinwood School Fire, at Lakeview Elementary School. One of the deadliest school fires in American history, 172 children, two young teachers, and one rescuer died in the fire after being trapped in stairwell vestibules. Originally, the students were thought to be trapped because doors to the school opened inward, but the coroner's report indicated that the doors did indeed open outward. While some of the children died from burns and smoke inhalation, most were either crushed or suffocated in the frantic attempt to escape the building. Those killed in the fire who could not be identified were buried in a mass grave in Cleveland's Lakeview Cemetery. National building standards requiring that doors in public buildings open outward were already in effect, and the fire did result in a trend towards municipalities nationwide adopting policies of school inspections and enforcing stricter building codes.

Annexed by Cleveland in 1912, portions of the Village of Nottingham were rolled into Collinwood.

For much of the 20th century, Collinwood thrived due in large part to heavy industry. Besides the railroad yards, major corporations such as General Motors, which operated its Fisher Body plant on Coit Road and General Electric with its Pitney Glass Works on E. 152nd., employed thousands of workers. By the eve of World War II, Collinwood's economic vitality had drawn large numbers of both ethnic white Europeans and Southern Appalachians. The 1960s had an influx of African Americans, who are today the majority population both in North and South Collinwood.

Collinwood took national center stage in the 1970s during a gang war when the Cleveland Mafia, centered in the Collinwood and Murray Hill neighborhoods, fought a territorial war with the Celtic Club led by Irish gangster Danny Greene. The eventual bombing death of Greene brought the federal organized-crime task force to Cleveland, which after many trials, is said to have crippled the Mafia in Cleveland.

In the 21st century, Collinwood has become a place of interest for artists seeking low-cost urban places to live and work. The housing and foreclosure crisis, though somewhat detrimental to the urban fabric of the neighborhood, has provided opportunities for artists to acquire properties very inexpensively. A collective known as Arts Collinwood has been instrumental in helping to revitalize the Waterloo Road business district on the north side of the neighborhood.

== North Shore Collinwood ==
Begun mainly as the residential section, North Shore Collinwood, commonly known as North Collinwood, is bounded roughly between E. 133rd Street to the west and E. 185th Street to the northeast (E.200th street due east), and between Lake Erie to the north and the Collinwood Railroad Yards and tracks (currently operated by CSX to the south, Woodworth Avenue to the southwest, and roughly Roseland Avenue to the southeast. North Collinwood is the location of several parks, including Wildwood Park and Marina, East Shore Park, and Beachland Park, and was the site of historic Euclid Beach Park. The Roman Catholic Villa Angela-St. Joseph High School is located at E. 185th and Lakeshore Boulevard.

== Collinwood–Nottingham ==
What was once the industry-heavy of the two sections, Collinwood–Nottingham, commonly known as South Collinwood, is roughly bounded between E. 134th Street on the west and Euclid Creek on the east, the Collinwood Railroad Yards and tracks to the north, Woodworth Avenue to the southwest, and roughly Roseland Avenue to the southeast. The location of the Five Points, where Ivanhoe Road, St. Clair Avenue, and E. 152nd Street intersect, is the central business district of the neighborhood, and is also the location of Collinwood High School, whose sports teams are aptly named the Railroaders. Although today it is largely African American, South Collinwood has historically been an enclave of European immigrants, as well as migrants from the Southern United States.

South Collinwood at one time was home to large concentrations of Eastern Europeans, and in particular, a large Slovenian community. The boyhood home to eventual Cleveland mayor and Ohio governor and senator, George Voinovich, the Slovenian neighborhood was centered on St. Mary of the Assumption Church, and the Slovenian Home, both located on Holmes Avenue. America's Polka King Frankie Yankovic, a South Collinwood native, played live polka music in many of the taverns and dance halls in the area and owned a music bar.

Italians, many of whom had settled the neighborhood after relocating from the Central neighborhood's Big Italy district, also settled heavily in the area, mainly along its southern border. The Italian Village, with a population of Italian descendants greater than that of Cleveland's Little Italy neighborhood, became well known for its Feast of St. Anthony, held every June and the Feast of the Assumption, held every August at Holy Redeemer Catholic Church on Kipling Avenue.

Its American immigrants, many relocated Southerners – mostly from Tennessee, West Virginia, and Kentucky – began arriving in the 1940s to work in the factories. Mainly they settled along the western edge of the neighborhood, especially along the E. 140th section; many bars in that area featured live country music and Southern food.

South Collinwood was once the headquarters for the Jordan Motor Car Company when it produced cars from 1916–1931. The plant was located at 1070 E. 152 St. Cleveland, where the Collinwood athletic complex stands today.

== Notable residents ==
- Tony Adamle (1924–2000) – professional football player with the Cleveland Browns in the All-America Football Conference and the National Football League (NFL)
- Eppie Barney (1944– 2004) – professional football player with the Cleveland Browns
- James Cotton (1976– ) - professional football player
- Wes Craven (1939-2015) – film director, screenwriter, producer, actor, and editor
- Jerry Dybzinski (1955– ) – Major League Baseball player
- George Fett (1920–1989) – cartoonist
- Alexis Floyd (1993– ) – stage and television actress
- Danny Greene (1933–1977) – gangster, mob boss, founded the Celtic Club, an Irish-American organized-crime syndicate, subject of the 2011 biopic Kill the Irishman
- John Claude Gummoe (1938– ) – singer-songwriter, lead singer of The Cascades, wrote and recorded "Rhythm of the Rain"
- Jeff Johnson – Cleveland City Council member and former Ohio state senator
- Dick Latessa (1929–2016) – stage, film, and television actor
- Joey Maxim (1922–2001) – professional boxer and World Light Heavyweight Champion
- Andre Norton (1912–2005) – author
- Sam Palumbo (1932– ) – professional football player
- Michael D. Polensek (1949– ) – Cleveland City Council member
- Monica Potter (1971– ) – film and television actress
- Cecil Shorts III (1987– ) – NFL player
- Stephanie Tubbs Jones (1949–2008) – US Congresswoman from 1999-2008
- The Vadnals (1937–1995) – Cleveland-style polka band and recording artists
- George Voinovich (1936–2016) – 54th Mayor of Cleveland, 65th governor of Ohio, and two-term U.S. Senator.
- Ray Zeh (1914–2003) – football player for Western Reserve, as a fullback led college football in scoring during the 1935 season

== See also ==
- Welcome to Collinwood
- Ginn Academy
