= Clark–Fulton =

Neighborhood of Cleveland, Ohio, United States

Coordinates: 41°28′N 81°43′W

- Neighborhood of Cleveland
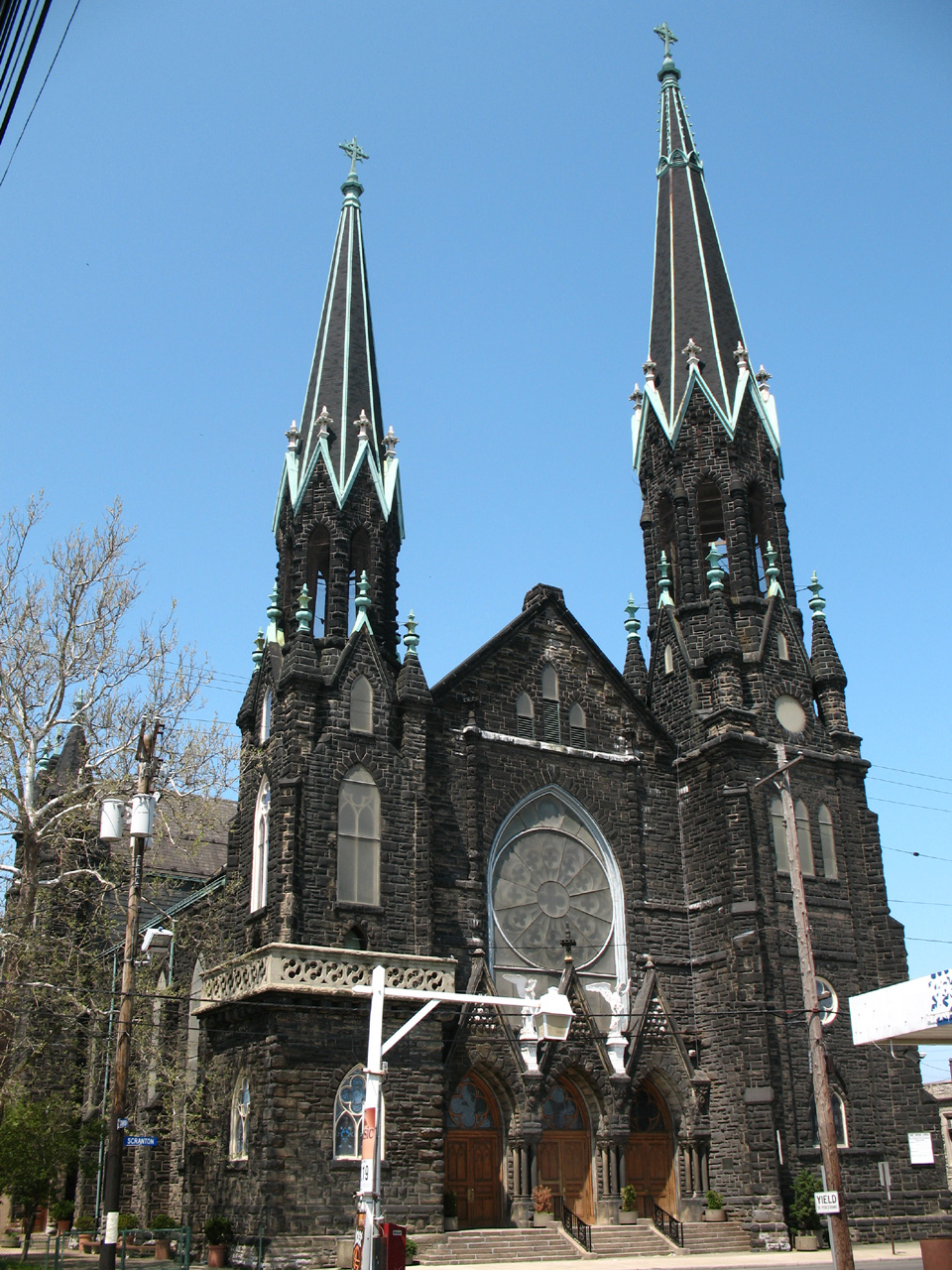

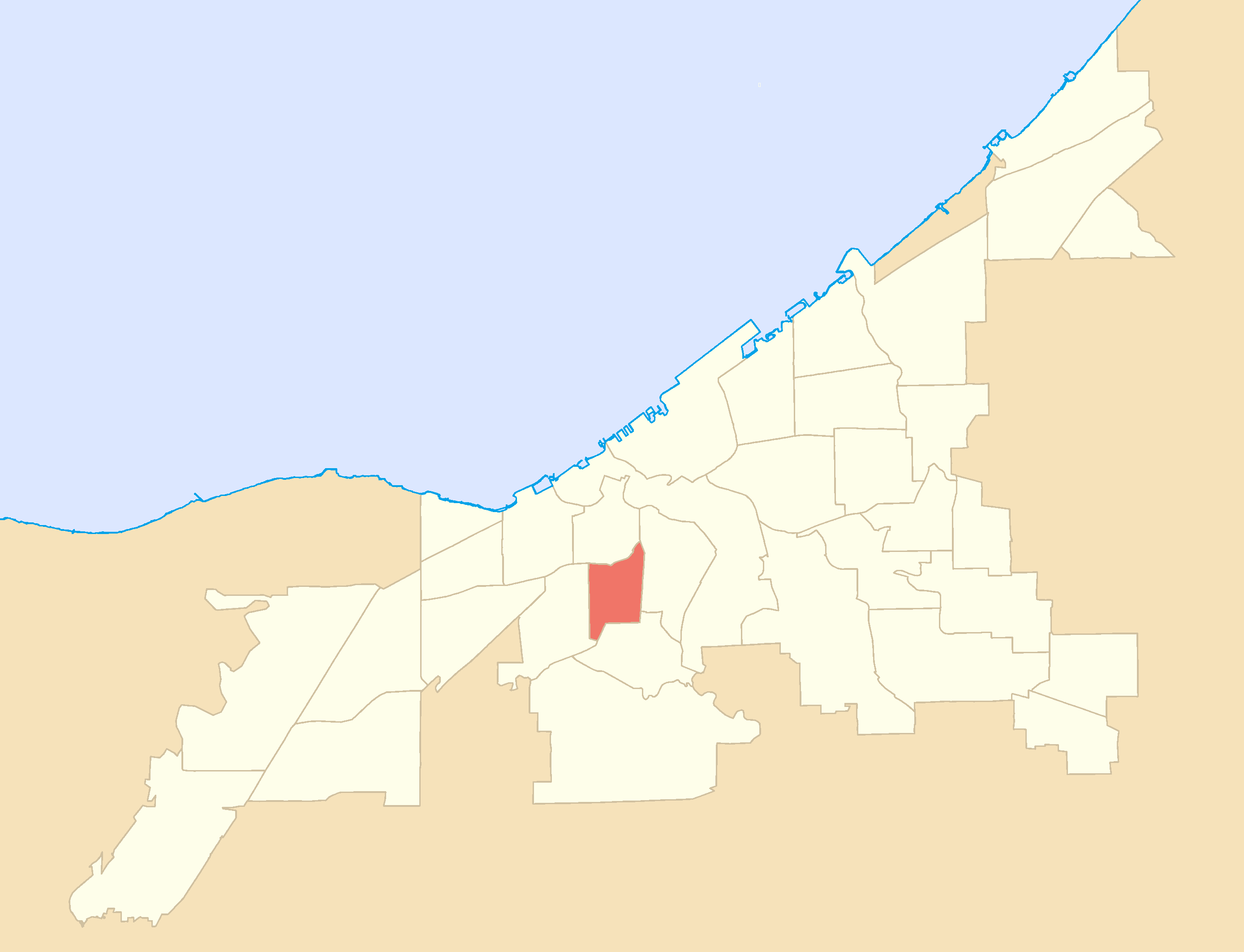
- Country: United States
- State: Ohio
- County: Cuyahoga County
- City: Cleveland

Population (2020)
  - Total: 7,918

Demographics
  - White: 61.9%
  - Black: 15.8%
  - Hispanic (of any race): 51.1%
  - Asian and Pacific Islander: 0.3%
  - Mixed and Other: 21.9%
- Time zone: UTC-5 (EST)
  - Summer (DST): UTC-4 (EDT)
- ZIP Codes: parts of 44109, 44102 and 44113
- Area code: 216
- Median income: $26,140
- Source: 2020 U.S. Census

Clark–Fulton is a neighborhood on the West Side of Cleveland, Ohio. It is bounded by Ohio City to the north, Tremont to the east, Brooklyn Centre to the south, and Stockyards on the west. The neighborhood, which covers about one square mile, is Cleveland's most densely populated community. In recent years, the neighborhood has begun calling itself La Villa Hispaña due to its large Hispanic population, Puerto Rican and otherwise. The community is focused on advancing and promoting Hispanic-owned businesses and cultural activities.

== History ==
Clark–Fulton is part of an old ethnic neighborhood that include the Old Brooklyn and Archwood-Denison areas. Early settlers were German and Eastern European families particularly those with Polish and Slovenian ancestry. According to the 2018 U.S. census estimate, the neighborhood has the highest concentration of Puerto Ricans, and Hispanics overall, in Cleveland and Cuyahoga County. This development was driven by competition for housing with other ethnic minorities. Puerto Rican migrants initially settled around the area of the Lady of Fatima Catholic Church.
