= Cuyahoga Valley =

Cuyahoga Valley may refer to:

- Cuyahoga Valley, a neighborhood in the city of Cleveland, Ohio
- Cuyahoga Valley National Park, an American national park in Northeast Ohio
