= Rebecca Maurer =

American politician

Rebecca Maurer (born 1989) is a Cleveland City Council member representing Ward 12 since 2022.

== Early life and education ==
Maurer was born in 1989 in Cleveland. She graduated from University of Chicago and Stanford Law School. Civil attorney Maurer started a blog Serial Land, providing history and context to Serial (podcast).

In 2019, she and other community activists formed Cleveland Lead Advocates for Safe Housing (CLASH).

== Political career ==
On Nov. 2, 2021, she was elected in Ward 12 and became the first out LGBTQ woman elected to Council.

Maurer, the only Jewish councilperson, was the only councilperson to call for a ceasefire in Gaza, which was supported by groups including the Cleveland Palestine Advocacy Community.
