= Lee–Miles =

Historical area of Cleveland, Ohio, United States

- Neighborhood of Cleveland
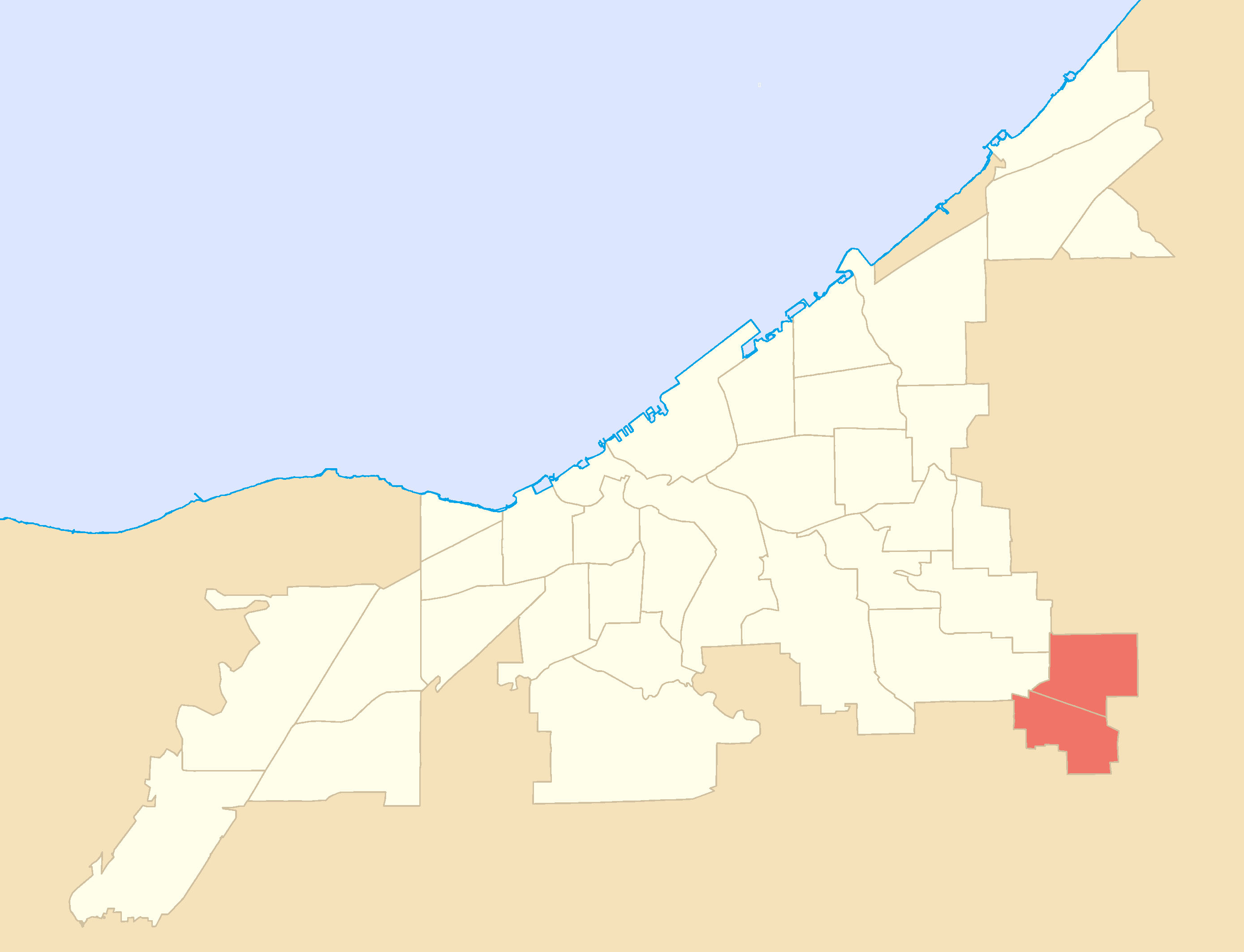
- Map of the Lee–Miles historical area, comprising the neighborhoods of Lee–Harvard and Lee–Seville
- Coordinates: 41°26′25″N 81°33′53″W
- Country: United States
- State: Ohio
- County: Cuyahoga County
- City: Cleveland

Population (2020)
  - Total: 10,901 (Lee–Harvard); 4,369 (Lee–Seville)

Demographics (Lee–Harvard)
  - White: 3.1%
  - Black: 92.5%
  - Hispanic (of any race): 2.1%
  - Asian and Pacific Islander: 2.0%
  - Mixed and Other: 2.4%

Demographics (Lee–Seville)
  - White: 2.5%
  - Black: 94.2%
  - Hispanic (of any race): 1%
  - Asian and Pacific Islander: 0.2%
  - Mixed and Other: 3.2%
- Time zone: UTC-5 (EST)
  - Summer (DST): UTC-4 (EDT)
- ZIP Codes: 44128, 44122
- Area code: 216
- Median income: $40,298 (Lee–Harvard) $33,644 (Lee–Seville)
- Source: 2020 U.S. Census, City Planning Commission of Cleveland

Lee–Miles is a historical area on the Southeast side of Cleveland, Ohio, comprising the two neighborhoods of Lee–Harvard and Lee–Seville. Once an independent municipality known as Miles Heights, it was annexed by Cleveland after a referendum in 1932. Today, it most corresponds to Cleveland's Ward 1.

A mostly middle-class African American neighborhood, Lee–Miles is bordered by the suburban cities of Shaker Heights to the north, Warrensville Heights to the east, Maple Heights to the south, Garfield Heights to the southwest and Cleveland's Union–Miles Park neighborhood to the northwest.

== Parks and recreations ==
- Kerruish Park (located along the Mill Creek)
- Frederick Douglass Park
- Lee–Harvard Community Service Center
- John F. Kennedy Recreational Center

== Education ==
- John F. Kennedy high school
- Whitney M. Young
- Charles W. Eliot School
- Citizens Academy Southwest
- Invictus High school
- Archbishop Lyke Campus
- Harvard Avenue Community School
- Ceogc Preschool
- Adlai Stevenson
- Charles W. Eliot School

== Others ==
- Lee–Harvard Shopping Plaza
- Cleveland Industrial Park – this community's largest development site. At 114 acres, this industrial park is located near I-480 with interchanges at Lee Road and Broadway Avenue, and was created by city government in 1981. Since 1998, the city has marketed opportunities for new business and successfully secured several industries who made commitments to create 600 new jobs in the $40 million industrial development.
- Cleveland Fire Station #17
- MetroHealth Medical Center Lee–Harvard Hospital
- Cleveland Public Library – Lee–Harvard Branch
