= Cuyahoga Valley, Cleveland =

Neighborhood of Cleveland, Ohio, United States

Coordinates: 41°29′N 81°40′W

Cuyahoga Valley
- Neighborhood of Cleveland
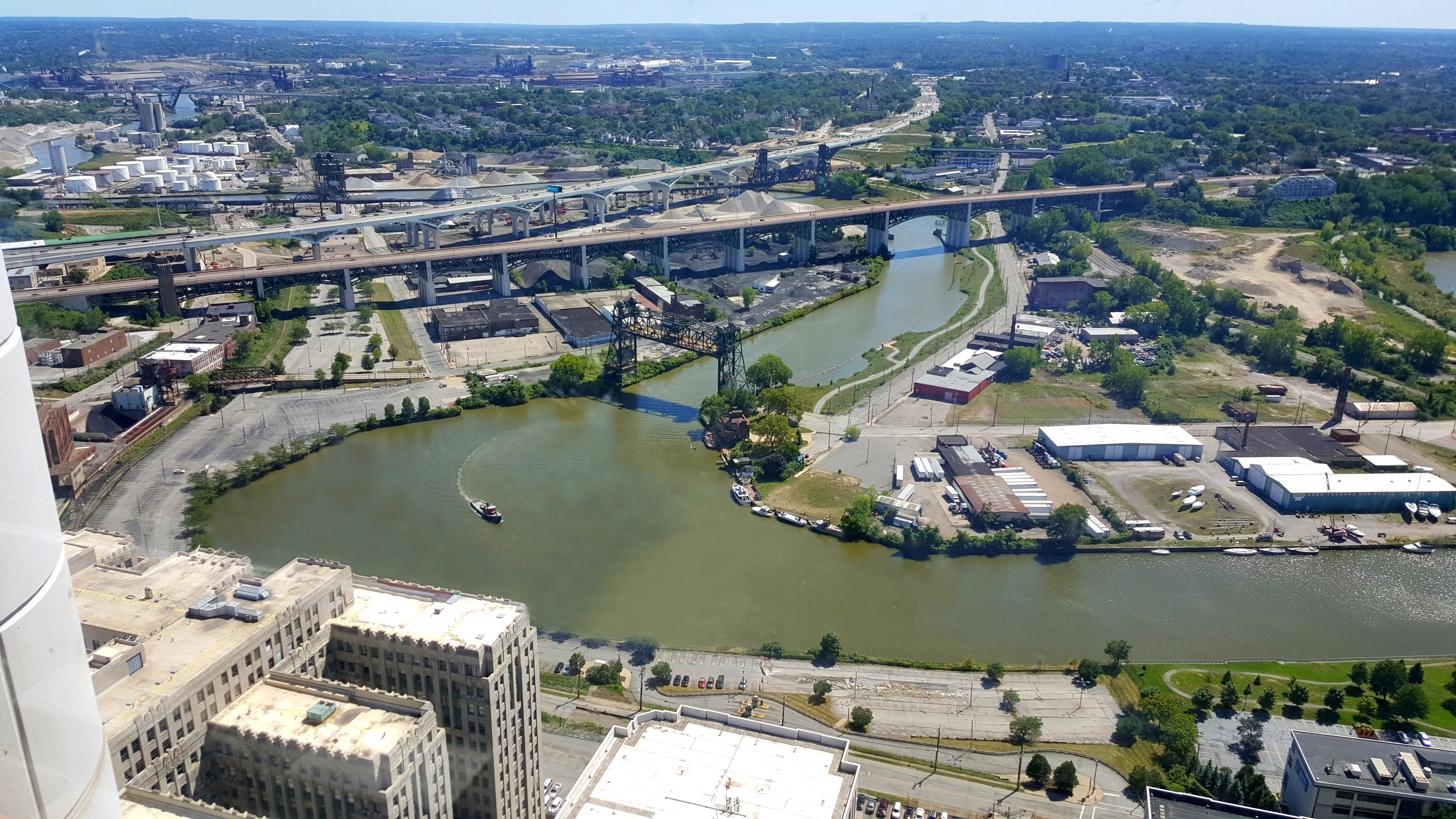

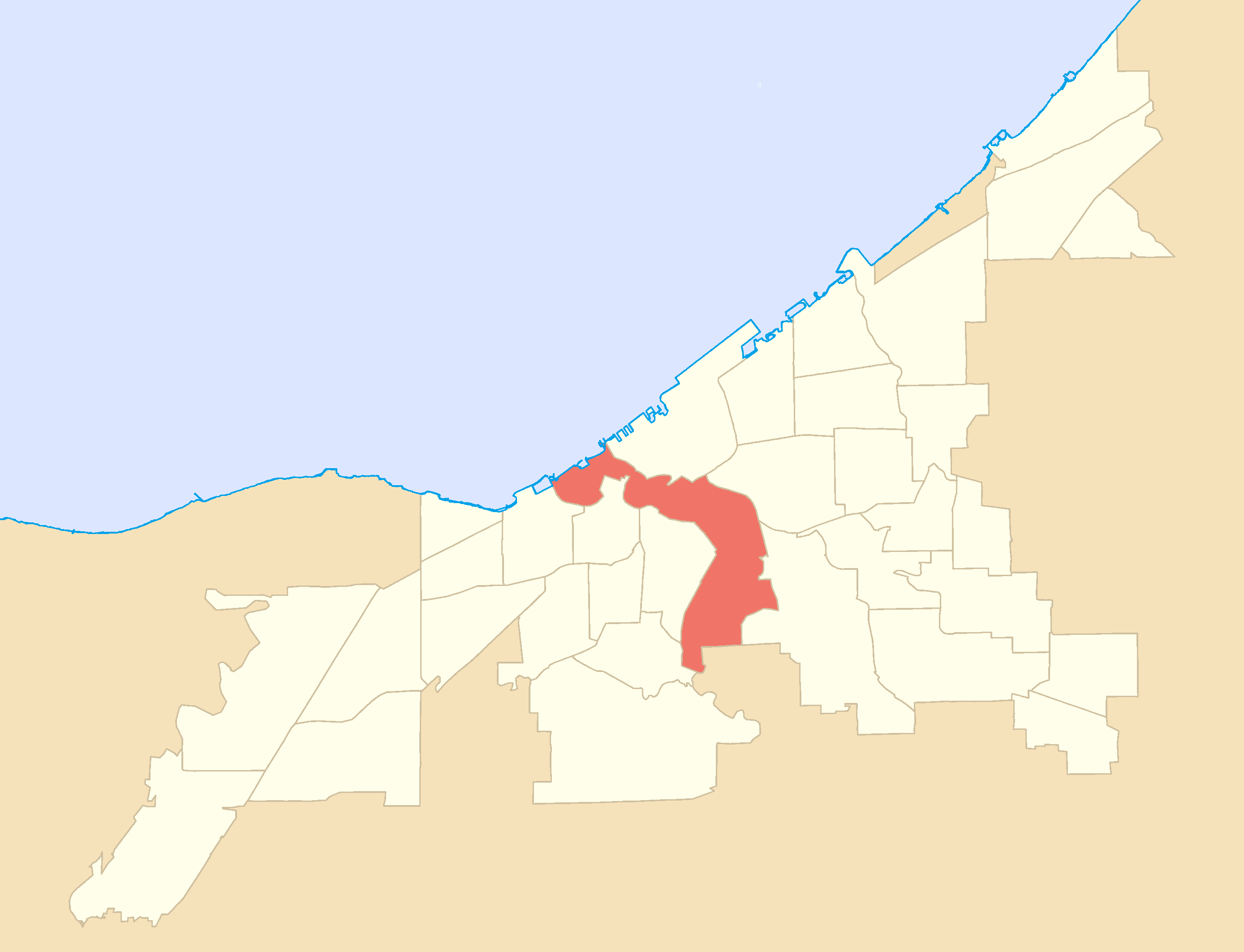
- Country: United States
- State: Ohio
- County: Cuyahoga County
- City: Cleveland

Population (2020)
  - Total: 1,057

Demographics
  - White: 26.9%
  - Black: 65.7%
  - Hispanic (of any race): 14.6%
  - Asian and Pacific Islander: 1.2%
  - Mixed and Other: 6.2%
- Time zone: UTC-5 (EST)
  - Summer (DST): UTC-4 (EDT)
- ZIP Codes: parts of 44113, 44115
- Area code: 216
- Median income: $23,061
- Source: 2020 U.S. Census, Cleveland City Planning Commission

Cuyahoga Valley is a neighborhood on the Central and South Side of Cleveland, Ohio, located along the Cuyahoga River. Formerly known as Industrial Valley, the neighborhood was originally limited to only one section of the geographic Cuyahoga River Valley, but the city expanded it in 2012 to include the entire valley area. The present neighborhood includes the Flats and extends from the peninsula of Whiskey Island in the north to the suburbs of Newburgh Heights and Cuyahoga Heights in the south. To the east, it borders Downtown Cleveland and the neighborhoods of Broadway–Slavic Village and Central. To the west, it borders the neighborhoods of Detroit–Shoreway, Ohio City, Tremont, and Brooklyn Centre.

== History ==
Cuyahoga Valley emerged on what was once part of Cleveland Township, which the city annexed in 1850 and quickly developed into the heart of one of the nation's leading industrial centers. Several factors, including close proximity to Lake Erie and the eastern bank of the Cuyahoga River being the terminus of the Ohio & Erie Canal, led to the rapid rise of Cuyahoga Valley's manufacturing output.

The iron industry (which would eventually grow into the steelmaking industry in the 20th century) rapidly grew during the Civil War era, as coal from Pennsylvania and iron ore from the Lake Superior region arrived at the centralized location along the river. By the 1870s, local industrial baron John D. Rockefeller of the Standard Oil Company had built his oil refineries in Cuyahoga Valley. The Grasselli Chemical Company (now part of DuPont) soon followed Rockefeller, whose refineries used much of the sulfuric acid produced by Grasselli's plant. By 1901, local foundries of the Otis Iron & Steel Company and the Cleveland Rolling Mill Company merged with the newly established US Steel. One of US Steel's subsidiaries, American Steel & Wire, made Cleveland the "wire capital" of the United States. The neighborhood also saw the arrivals of companies such as LTV Steel and Republic Steel.

Production peaked in the 1950s when Cleveland ranked third nationwide in steelmaking and fourth in processed metal products. Until sea changes in nationwide manufacturing trends of the 1970s and 80s, Cuyahoga Valley remained at the heart of an industrial powerhouse. The early 1980s recession witnessed LTV, Republic and US Steel all closing, relocating or merging operations, which led to massive unemployment numbers in the Cleveland area. Although still a prominent industry in the 21st century, steel plays a much smaller role in the neighborhood than it once did.

== The Flats ==
The Cuyahoga Valley neighborhood also encompasses Cleveland's Flats. Historically home to much of the city's steel industry, today it is a mixed-use portion area. During the mid-1980s, the Flats grew to be an entertainment district. Music venues and clubs appeared on both the East Bank and West Bank, though, as evidenced by the decline of the East Bank in the late 90s, the other side of the river proved to be the more commercially viable development. A combination of factors, including compliance issues with city health and fire code and an elevated crime rate, coupled with the rise of the Warehouse District, proved to be the demise of much of the entertainment district. Private developers such as Scott Wolstein and the now-defunct Flats Oxbow Association have helped plan and redevelop the Flats through housing developments, which include new construction as well as renovated warehouse spaces, on both sides of the river.
