= Jasmin Santana =

American politician (born 1979)

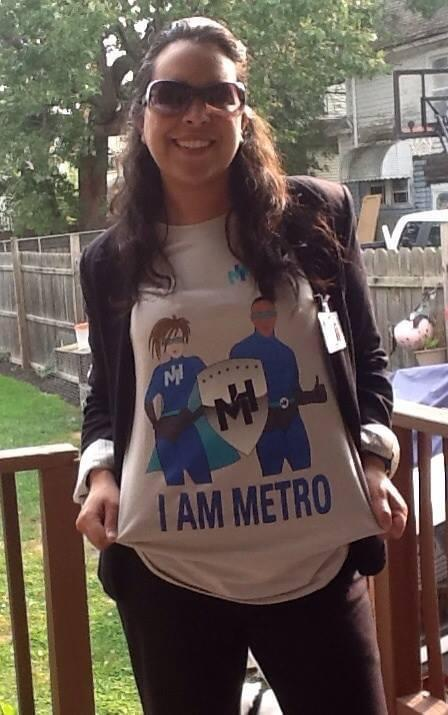
Jasmin Santana

Jasmin Santana is a Cleveland City Council member representing Ward 14. The first Latina member, she serves as majority leader.

== Early life and education ==
Santana was born in Cleveland at MetroHealth around 1979. She graduated from Cleveland Metropolitan School District schools and Lincoln West High School. Her mother is a native of Puerto Rico. Santana has two teenage children.

Santana developed a breast cancer outreach program at MetroHealth.

== Political career ==
In 2017, Santana was elected to Cleveland City Council in Ward 14. She was named majority whip in 2021, and was named majority leader in 2025. She advocates for Spanish language access and a more coordinated welcome for immigrants. She advocated for CentroVilla25, a multi-stalled market that ends the food desert in the Clark-Fulton neighborhood.
