= Nottingham, Ohio =

The village of Nottingham was a municipality located in Euclid Township, Cuyahoga County, Ohio. It was one of a string of villages along the railroad running east from Cleveland. Nottingham was first organizd in 1873 and then re-incorporated in 1899 before being annexed into Cleveland in 1912.

== Location ==
The Village of Nottingham was a portion of the former Euclid Township, located between East 185th and East 200th Streets. Lake Erie bordered it on the north with the New York Central and New York, Chicago and St. Louis Railroad to the southeast and East 170th Street to the south.

== History ==
The village was first organized in 1873. In 1911-1912 the city of Cleveland annexed Nottingham Village along with parts of Euclid.

Like many communities of the day, Nottingham had its conflicts concerning alcohol. In January 1903 the village passed a law disallowing the sale of beverages which contained alcohol content greater than two percent. However, later on the same year city authorities arrested three restaurant owners on the suspicion they had sold beverages with alcohol content in excess of the allowable amount.

In 1905 the “wets,” those in support of the sale of alcohol, and the “drys,” those opposed to it, submitted separate petitions to the Nottingham town council. The council deemed the “dry” petition bogus (the list was padded with fictitious names) and unnecessary, given that the law prohibiting the sale of alcohol was still in effect. The “wets” filed a petition of their own calling for the aptly named R.U. Wright to vacate the position of marshal. Wright had been responsible for closing a number of speakeasies. The town council was not receptive to this request.

== The Dille Family ==
The Dilles were a prominent family in Euclid and Cleveland during the nineteenth century, and, were important figures in Nottingham history as well. In fact, a road in the area of Cleveland formerly known as Nottingham Village is called Dille Road after the family. In 1907 Mr. Carrie E. Dille made a successful bid for a seat on the village's school board.

== Sources ==
- The Farm Journal Complete World Atlas, 1912 Edition, p. 72.
- (1903, November 25). Selling liquor in a dry town. Plain Dealer, 5.
- (1905, March 8). To look into petition. Plain Dealer, 12.
