= Michael Polensek =

American politician

Michael D. Polensek
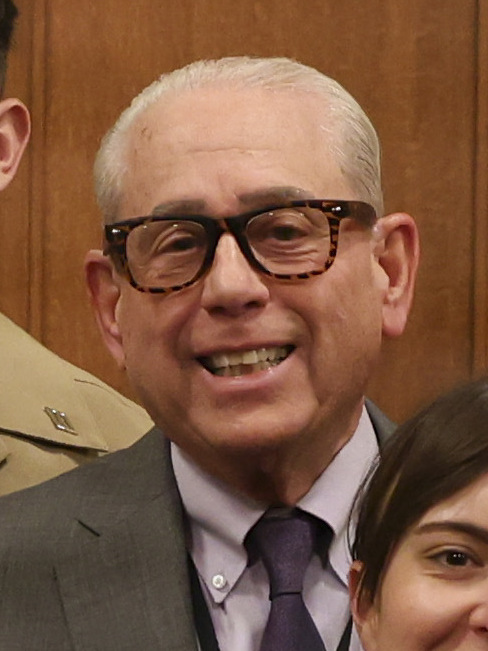
- Polensek in 2026

President of the Cleveland City Council
- In office 2000–2001
- Preceded by: Jay Westbrook
- Succeeded by: Frank G. Jackson

Member of the Cleveland City Council
- Incumbent
- Assumed office 1978
- Preceded by: Albert Ballew
- Constituency: 26th Ward (1978–1982); 8th Ward (1982–2026); 10th Ward (2026–present)

Personal details
- Born: November 16, 1949 (age 76)
- Party: Democratic
- Spouse: Kathy
- Children: 5
- Education: Cuyahoga Community College
- Website: Office website

Michael D. Polensek (born November 16, 1949) is a City Council member in Cleveland, Ohio, representing the 10th ward since 2026. A member of the Democratic Party, he has served in the Cleveland City Council since 1978.

== Political career ==
Polensek was first elected to council in 1977 representing what was Ward 26 until 1982, then representing Ward 11 for ten terms, and is now in his second term representing Ward 8. All totaled he is serving in his 13th term in Council. He served as Council President from 1999 to 2002. He is also an Executive Board member of the Cuyahoga County Democratic Party, and the founder of the Collinwood Nottingham Villages and the Northeast Shores Development Corporations in Ward 11. On November 5, 2013, Polensek won the election for the newly reconfigured Ward 8, uncontested. He was endorsed by the Cleveland Plain Dealer.

== City Council positions ==
Polensek is Vice-Chair of the Public Safety Committee and a member of the Health and Human Services, Public Parks, Property and Recreation, Public Service, Public Utilities, and Rules committees.

== Personal ==
Polensek, a Slovene American, grew up in the Slovenian section of Collinwood, attending the Nottingham and Hannah Gibbons Elementary Schools and eventually graduated from Collinwood High School in January 1969, where he is a member of the Collinwood High School Hall of Fame. His mother and two sisters also graduated from Collinwood. He played freshman, junior and varsity football at Collinwood and played on the 1967 unbeaten East Senate Championship Football Team in the Thanksgiving Day Charity Game at Cleveland Lakefront Stadium. Polensek attended Tri-C Community College at their Metro campus through the Cleveland Scholarship Program, where he studied Industrial Management. He remains an active member of the congregation member at St. Mary of the Assumption Slovenian Catholic Church.

== Notes ==
Political offices
Preceded by Jay Westbrook	President of Cleveland City Council; 2000–2001	Succeeded by Frank G. Jackson
