= Neighborhoods in Cleveland =

Designated neighborhoods within the city

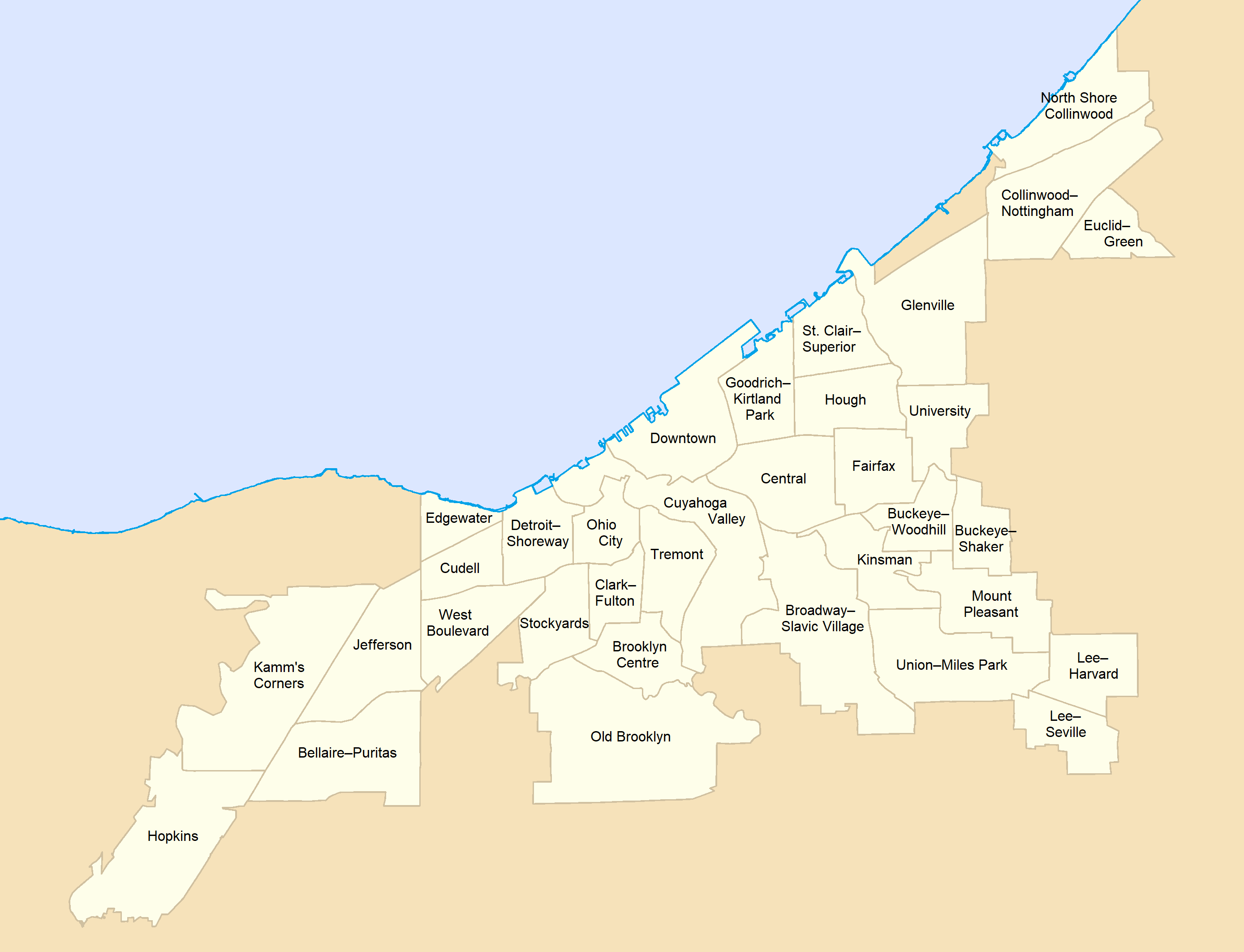
Neighborhoods of Cleveland as defined by the Cleveland City Planning Commission in 2012

Neighborhoods in Cleveland refer to the 34 neighborhood communities of the city of Cleveland, Ohio, as defined by the Cleveland City Planning Commission. Based on historical definitions and census data, the neighborhoods serve as the basis for various urban planning initiatives on both the municipal and metropolitan levels. Technically known as Statistical Planning Areas (SPAs), they also provide a "framework for summarizing socio-economic and other statistics within the city." City neighborhood boundaries were last revised by the City Planning Commission in 2012.

Cleveland's neighborhoods are generally defined by their position on either the East Side or West Side of the Cuyahoga River. Downtown and Cuyahoga Valley are situated between the East and West Sides, while the Broadway–Slavic Village neighborhood is sometimes referred to as the South Side.

== Neighborhoods ==
No.	Neighborhood	Location	Map
01	Bellaire–Puritas	West Side (West Park)	
02	Broadway–Slavic Village	South and East Side	
03	Brooklyn Centre	West Side	
04	Buckeye–Shaker	East Side	
05	Buckeye–Woodhill	East Side	
06	Central	East Side	
07	Clark–Fulton	West Side	
08	Collinwood–Nottingham	East Side (Collinwood)	
09	Cudell	West Side	
10	Cuyahoga Valley (Note: Includes Whiskey Island and The Flats.)	Central and South Side	
11	Detroit–Shoreway	West Side	
12	Downtown (Note: Downtown districts include the Campus District, Civic Center, East 4th Street, Gateway District, Nine-Twelve District, North Coast Harbor, Playhouse Square, Superior Arts District, Warehouse District, and historically Short Vincent.)	City Center	
13	Edgewater	West Side	
14	Euclid–Green	East Side	
15	Fairfax	East Side	
16	Glenville	East Side	
17	Goodrich–Kirtland Park (Note: Includes Asiatown.)	East Side	
18	Hopkins	West Side (West Park)	
19	Hough	East Side	
20	Jefferson	West Side (West Park)	
21	Kamm's Corners	West Side (West Park)	
22	Kinsman	East Side	
23	Lee–Harvard	East Side (Lee–Miles)	
24	Lee–Seville	East Side (Lee–Miles)	
25	Mount Pleasant	East Side	
26	North Shore Collinwood	East Side (Collinwood)	
27	Ohio City	West Side	
28	Old Brooklyn	West Side	
29	St. Clair–Superior	East Side	
30	Stockyards	West Side	
31	Tremont (Note: Includes Duck Island.)	West Side	
32	Union–Miles Park	East Side	
33	University (Note: Includes Little Italy.)	East Side	
34	West Boulevard	West Side	
