= Tremont, Cleveland =

Neighborhood of Cleveland, Ohio, United States

Tremont
- Neighborhood of Cleveland
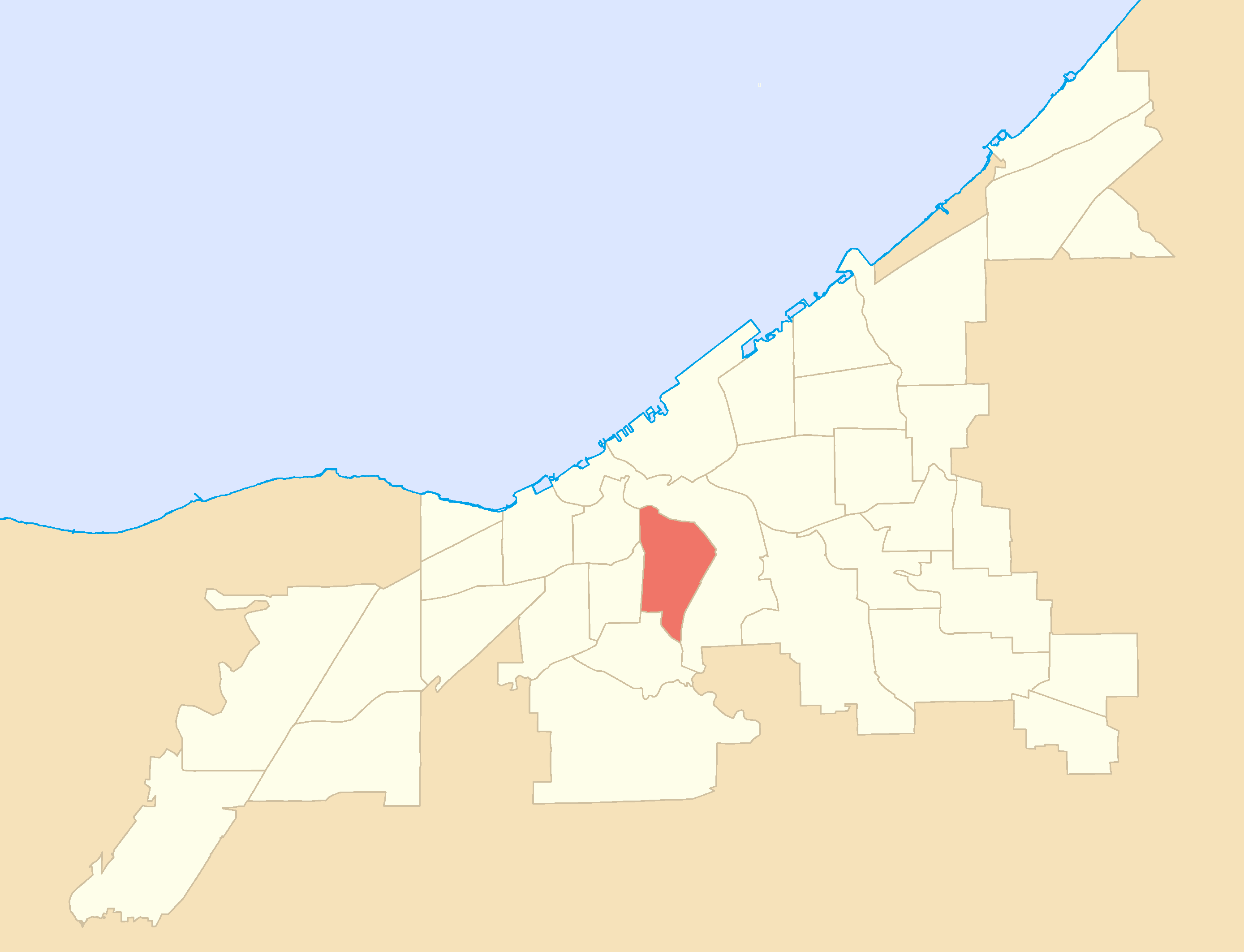
- Coordinates: 41°28′25″N 81°41′19″W
- Country: United States
- State: Ohio
- County: Cuyahoga County
- City: Cleveland

Population (2020)
  - Total: 7,731

Demographics
  - White: 71.2%
  - Black: 16.9%
  - Hispanic (of any race): 15.6%
  - Asian: 2.5%
  - Mixed and Other: 9.4%
- Time zone: UTC-5 (EST)
  - Summer (DST): UTC-4 (EDT)
- ZIP Codes: 44109, 44113
- Area code: 216
- Median income: $46,987
- Source: 2013–2017 American Community Survey 5-Year Estimates

- Tremont Historic District
- U.S. National Register of Historic Places
- U.S. Historic district
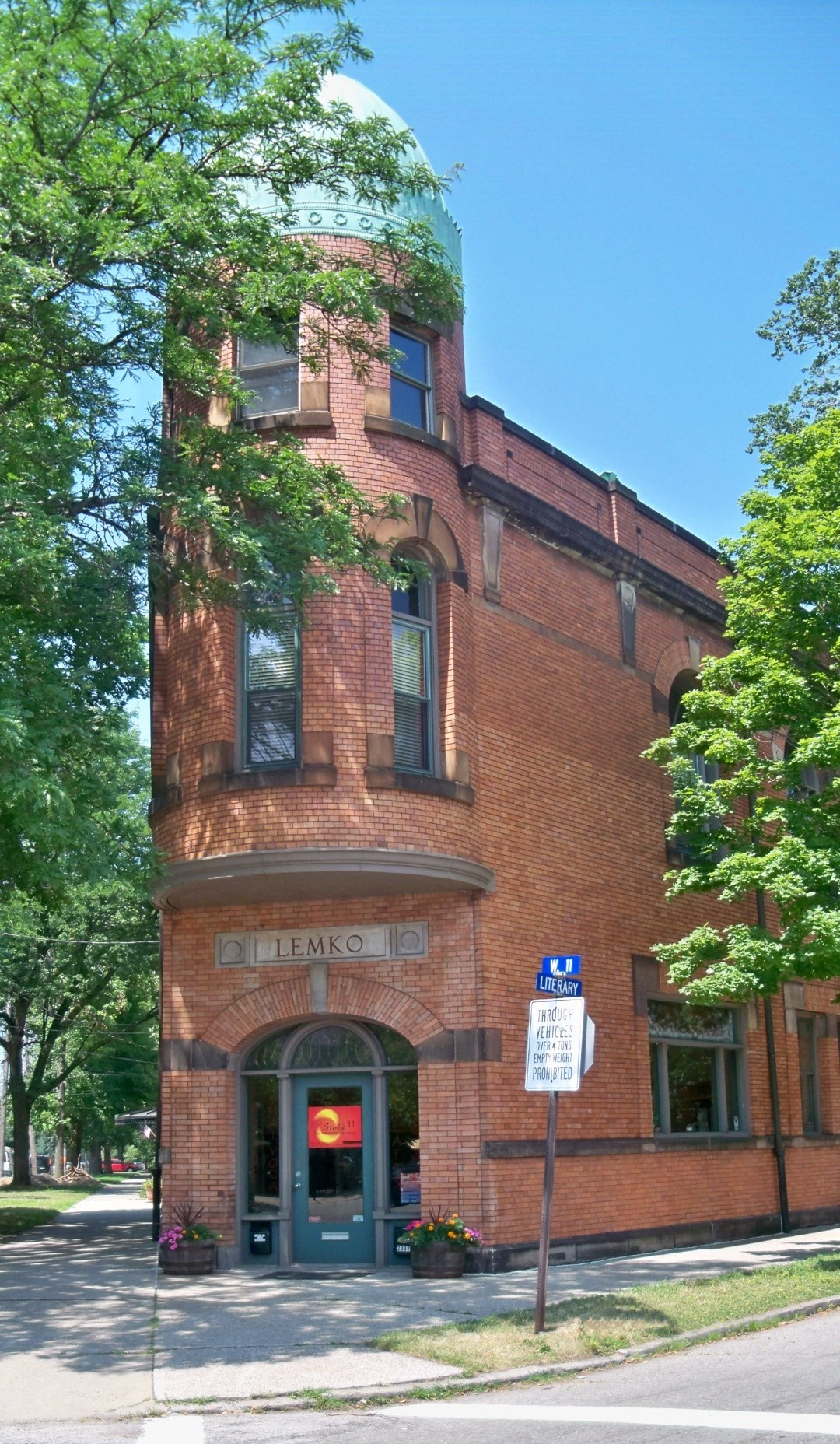
- Lemko Hall, at the intersection of W.11th Street and Literary Road

- Location within Cleveland Location within Ohio Location within the United States
- Location: Roughly bounded by I-490, I-71, University Ct., W. 7th St., Starkweather Ave., Brayton, Fruit Ave. and Auburn Ave., Cleveland, Ohio
- Area: 184.7 acres (74.7 ha)
- Built: 1851
- Architectural style: Late Victorian, Cleveland Double, American Foursquare, Carpenter Gothic, Stick style
- NRHP reference No.: 94000719
- Added to NRHP: July 15, 1994

Tremont is a neighborhood on the West Side of Cleveland, Ohio. Listed on the National Register of Historic Places, the district sits just south of the Ohio City neighborhood. It is bounded by the Cuyahoga Valley to the north and east, MetroHealth medical center to the south, and West 25th Street and Columbus Road to the west.

Tremont is one of Cleveland's oldest neighborhoods, and has been historically home to many different ethnic immigrant groups, including Germans, Greeks, and East Slavs. It has numerous historic churches with architecture and artwork including St. Michael the Archangel (1892), Pilgrim Congregational UCC (founded in 1859), St. Augustine (1893), St. John Cantius (1898), and St. Theodosius Russian Orthodox Cathedral (1912). The neighborhood has seen significant growth in recent decades and is today home to many restaurants and art galleries, and has emerged as a local cultural center, attracting technology companies with plans to further develop and preserve its historic landscape.

== History ==
Tremont, was originally part of Brooklyn Township and from 1836 until 1854 was a section of what is now its sister neighborhood, Ohio City, when the latter was an independent town. Both were later annexed by the city of Cleveland, but Tremont remained independent until 1867. During the early 1850s, the now-defunct Cleveland University briefly occupied a section of Tremont, and in fact, before being named Tremont, the neighborhood was briefly known as University Heights (not to be confused with the eastern Cleveland suburb of the same name). Vestiges of the neighborhood's days as a college town remain, however, in streets with scholarly names, such as Professor, Literary, College and University. The early 20th century saw an influx of East Slavic immigrants (Ukrainians, Rusyns, Russians, and Belarusians) who sought work in the steel mills in the area. By 1920, Tremont was home to over 36,000 residents. However, the population had begun to steadily decline in the 1960s. With the loss of manufacturing jobs particularly in Cleveland's steel industry, culminating in the recession of the early 1980s, Tremont's population dwindled. By the 2000 census there were fewer than 9,000 residents.

Since the early 2000s and especially since the 2010s, Tremont has reinvented itself and is experiencing a revival. With its close proximity to downtown and affordable dwellings, the neighborhood began a revival in the 1990s due in large part to an influx of new residents, including young professionals, empty nesters, hipsters and immigrants attracted to the neighborhood's amenities, historic housing stock and new infill housing. Tremont has become a destination spot with numerous shops and art galleries, as well as restaurants, bars, and bistros, such as Iron Chef Michael Symon's Lolita, which closed in 2016 due to fire damage. Walkabout Tremont occurs on the 2nd Friday of each month.

== Points of interest ==
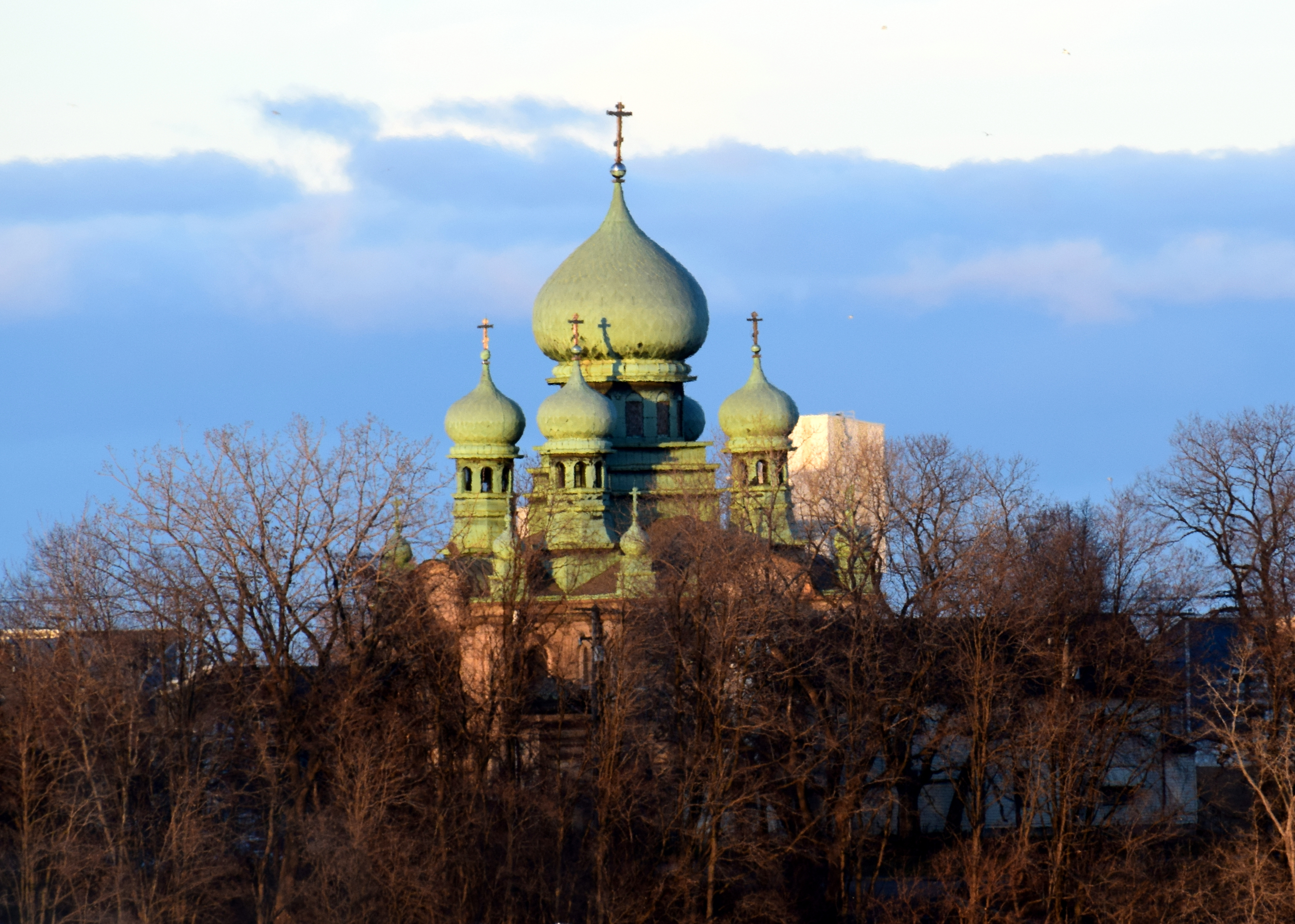
St. Theodosius Russian Orthodox Cathedral

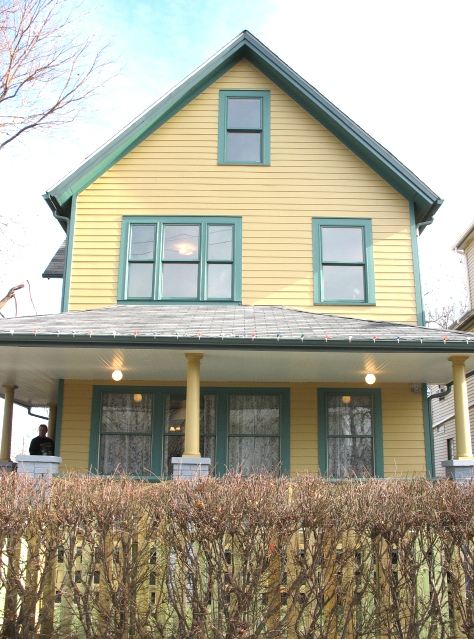
A Christmas Story House

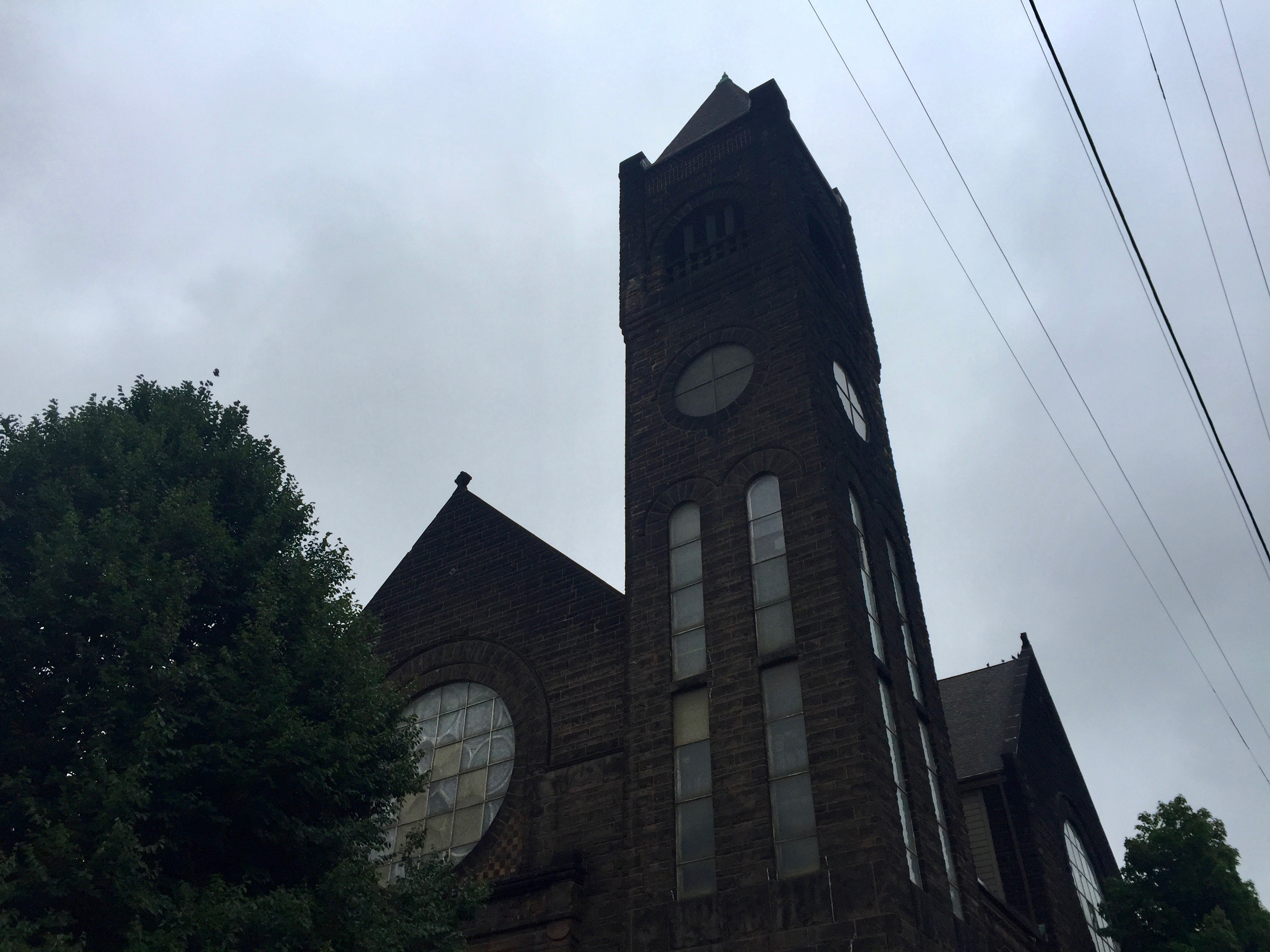
Pilgrim Congregational Church

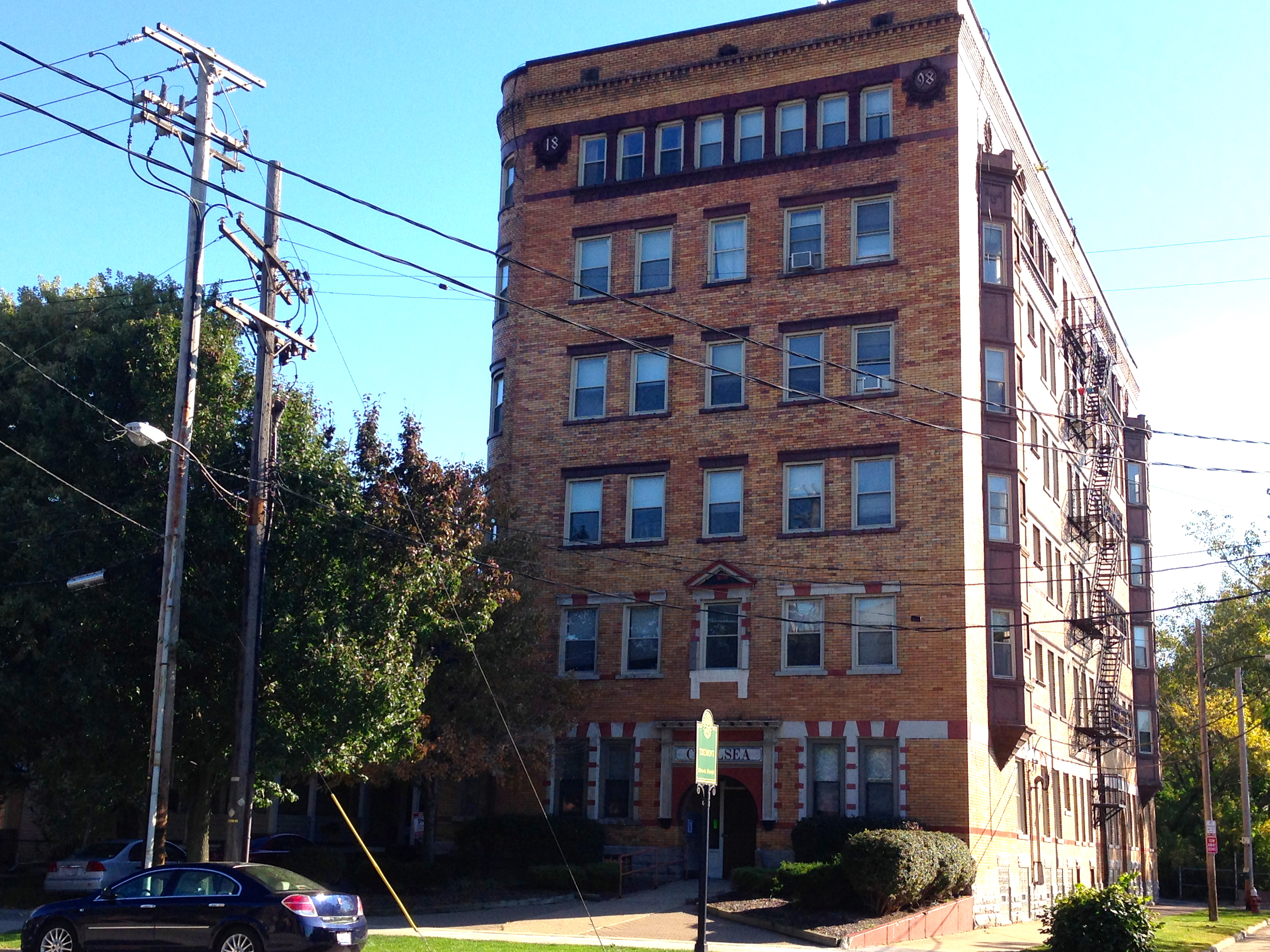
The Chelsea Building

=== Neighborhood landmarks ===
- Lemko Hall (2337 W. 11th St.) - The historic hall served as a social gathering place for the one-time sizable concentration of East Slavic Lemko immigrants from the region of Lemkovina who lived in Tremont. Today it is a mixed use (retail and condominiums) structure and a city landmark. It is most famous for being the site of the wedding reception in the 1978 film, The Deer Hunter.
- St. Theodosius Russian Orthodox Cathedral (733 Starkweather Ave.) - Also featured in The Deer Hunter, the cathedral was built in 1912, and is listed on the National Register of Historic Places.
- Pilgrim Congregational Church (2592 West 14th Street) - built in 1894, on the National Register of Historic Places.
- A Christmas Story House (3159 West 11th Street) - Site of several exterior scenes in the 1983 holiday film, A Christmas Story, the house was home to protagonist Ralphie Parker and his family. It was purchased on eBay in 2004 by San Diego entrepreneur Brian Jones and subsequently renovated to replicate the interior and exterior as seen in the film, and is now a museum.
- The Chelsea Building is one of the oldest high rise buildings constructed in Cleveland, being erected in 1898. The building also has the first residential elevator installed in the city.

=== Duck Island ===
Bisected by Abbey Avenue, Duck Island is a popular sub-neighborhood within Tremont. It is bounded by Lorain Avenue to the north, the RTA Red Line to the west, Scranton Road to the east, and Train Avenue to the south. It is not a physical island and it has "nothing whatsoever to do with ducks." The name is said to have entered common usage in Cleveland during Prohibition when Duck Island became "a place where bootleggers would 'duck' the law."

== Education ==
- Northeast Ohio College Preparatory School
