= Stockyards, Cleveland =

Neighborhood of Cleveland, Ohio, United States

Stockyards
- Neighborhood of Cleveland
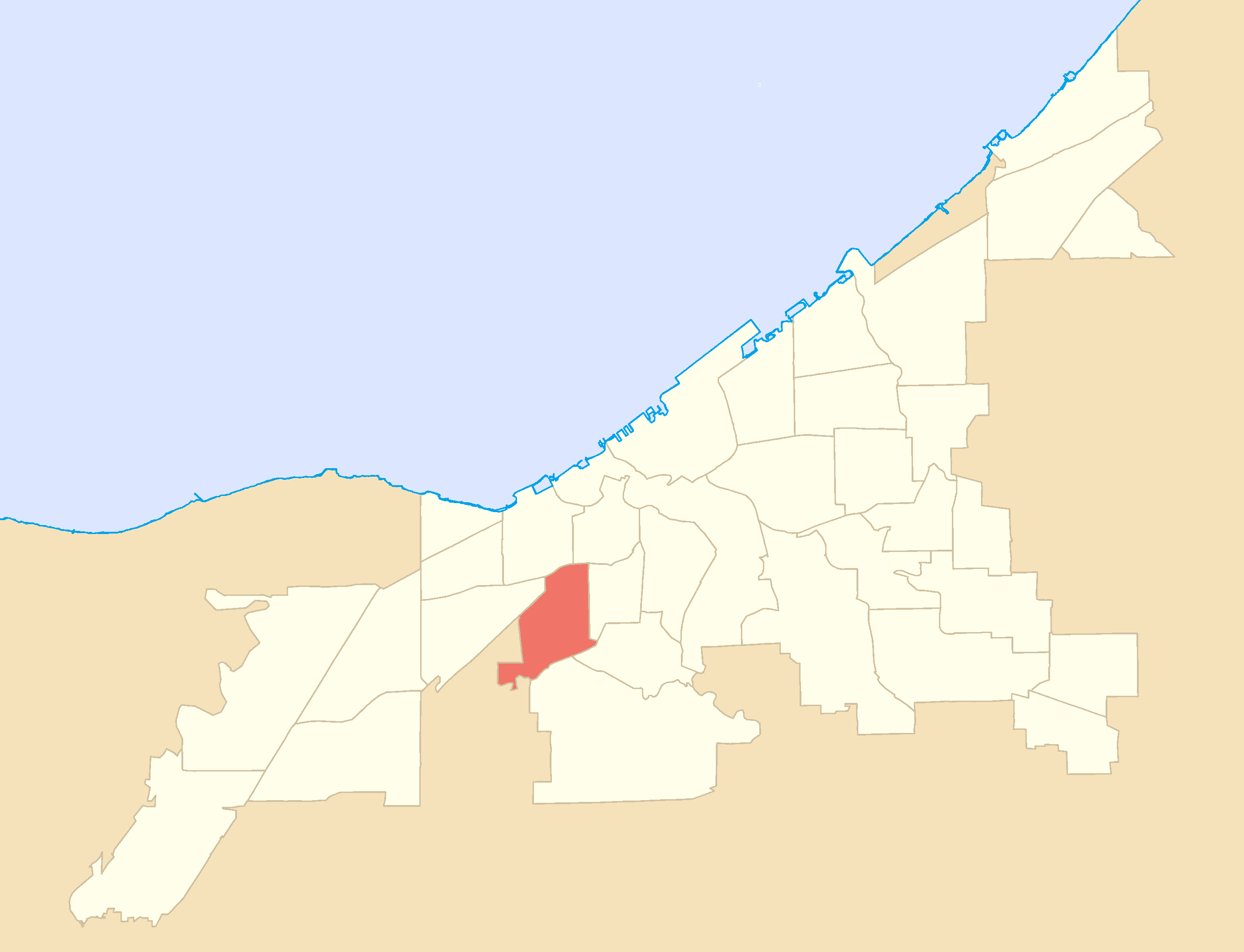
- Coordinates: 41°29′2″N 81°35′26″W
- Country: United States
- State: Ohio
- County: Cuyahoga County
- City: Cleveland

Population (2020)
  - Total: 10,488

Demographics
  - White: 65.5%
  - Black: 12.9%
  - Hispanic (of any race): 41%
  - Asian and Pacific Islander: 0.8%
  - Mixed and Other: 20.7%
- Time zone: UTC-5 (EST)
  - Summer (DST): UTC-4 (EDT)
- ZIP Codes: 44102, 44144, 44109
- Area code: 216
- Median income: $28,011
- Source: 2020 U.S. Census, City Planning Commission of Cleveland

Stockyards, colloquially the Stockyards or simply the Yards, is a neighborhood on the West Side of Cleveland, Ohio. It is located between I-71 to the south, roughly Ridge Road to the west, West 44th Street to the east, and just south of I-90 to the north. The neighborhood has been historically home to significant communities of Hungarians and Czechs, and since the 1980s, it has also been home to a growing Hispanic community.

Historical population
Census	Pop.	Note	%±
1980	9,071		—
1990	8,482		−6.5%
2000	8,616		1.6%
2020	10,488		—
