= Demographics of Cleveland =

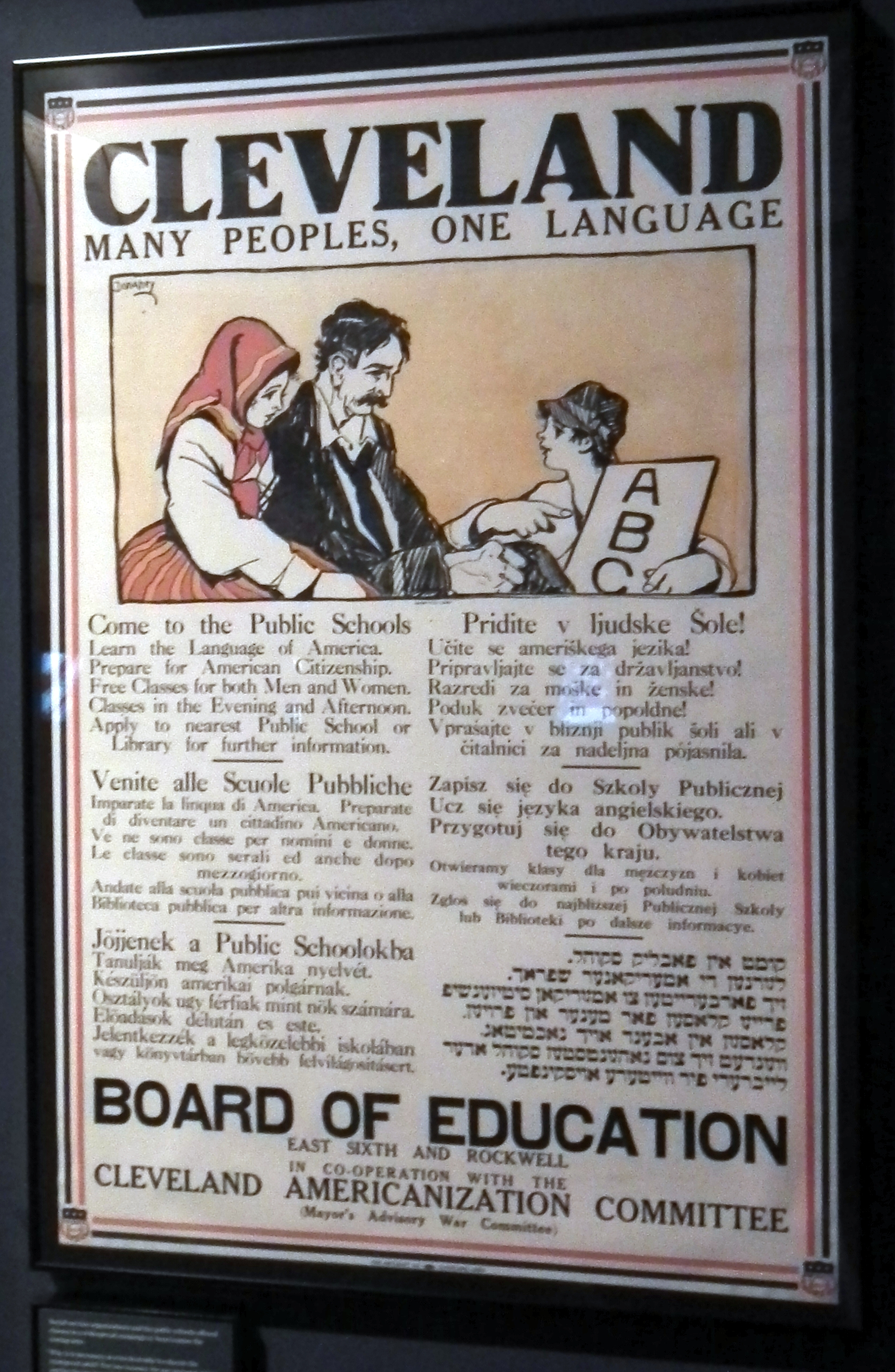
1917 multilingual poster in English, Italian, Hungarian, Slovene, Polish, and Yiddish, advertising English classes for new immigrants in Cleveland.

The demographics of Cleveland have fluctuated throughout the city's history. From its founding in 1796, Cleveland's population grew to 261,353 by 1890, and to 796,841 by 1920, making it the fifth largest city in the United States at the time. By 1930, the population rose to 900,429 and, after World War II, it reached 914,808. Due to various historical factors including deindustrialization, suburbanization, and urban sprawl, Cleveland's population began decreasing in the 1960s. By 1970, the city's population was 750,903. By 1980, it was 573,822 and it had lost its position as one of the top 10 largest cities in the U.S. By 2020, the population had further fallen to 372,624. Beginning in 2018, the city's population began to flatten, after decades of decline. Additionally, between 2010 and 2020, several neighborhoods within Cleveland saw a significant population increase, most notably Downtown, but also University Circle and several West Side neighborhoods.

== Population data ==
Historical population
Year	Pop.	±%
1820	606	—
1830	1,075	+77.4%
1840	6,071	+464.7%
1850	17,034	+180.6%
1860	43,417	+154.9%
1870	92,829	+113.8%
1880	160,146	+72.5%
1890	261,353	+63.2%
1900	381,768	+46.1%
1910	560,663	+46.9%
1920	796,841	+42.1%
1930	900,429	+13.0%
1940	878,336	−2.5%
1950	914,808	+4.2%
1960	876,050	−4.2%
1970	750,903	−14.3%
1980	573,822	−23.6%
1990	505,616	−11.9%
2000	478,403	−5.4%
2010	396,815	−17.1%
2020	372,624	−6.1%
* = Population estimate. Source: United States Census records and Population Estimates Program data.

As of the 2020 Census, there were 372,624 people and 170,549 households residing in the city of Cleveland (a population roughly comparable to that of Zurich). The population density was 4,901.51/sq mi (1,892.5/km2). During the day, incoming commuters from other parts of Cuyahoga County and Metropolitan Cleveland increase the city's population by 30%.

The median income for a household in the city was $30,907. The per capita income for the city was $21,223. 32.7% of the population living below the poverty line. Of the city's population over the age of 25, 17.5% held a bachelor's degree or higher, and 80.8% had a high school diploma or equivalent.

According to the 2010 census, 29.7% of Cleveland households had children under the age of 18 living with them, 22.4% were married couples living together, 25.3% had a female householder with no husband present, 6.0% had a male householder with no wife present, and 46.4% were non-families. 39.5% of all households were made up of individuals, and 10.7% had someone living alone who was 65 years of age or older. The average household size was 2.29 and the average family size was 3.11.

In 2010, the median age in the city was 35.7 years. 24.6% of residents were under the age of 18; 11% were between the ages of 18 and 24; 26.1% were from 25 to 44; 26.3% were from 45 to 64; and 12% were 65 years of age or older. The gender makeup of the city was 48.0% male and 52.0% female.

== Ethnic and racial composition ==
Cleveland, Ohio – Racial and ethnic composition Note: the US Census treats Hispanic/Latino as an ethnic category. This table excludes Latinos from the racial categories and assigns them to a separate category. Hispanics/Latinos may be of any race.
Race / Ethnicity (NH = Non-Hispanic)	Pop 1970	Pop 1980	Pop 1990	Pop 2000	Pop 2010	Pop 2020	% 1970	% 1980	% 1990	% 2000	% 2010	% 2020
White alone (NH)	458,084	301,748	241,552	185,641	132,710	119,547	61.00%	52.59%	47.77%	38.80%	33.44%	32.08%
Black or African American alone (NH)	287,841	249,209	234,050	241,512	208,208	176,813	38.33%	43.43%	46.29%	50.48%	52.47%	47.45%
Native American or Alaska Native alone (NH)	1,183	1,158	1,396	1,195	997	844	0.16%	0.20%	0.28%	0.25%	0.25%	0.23%
Asian alone (NH)	1,852	3,119	4,948	6,284	7,213	10,390	0.16%	0.54%	0.98%	1.31%	1.82%	2.79%
Native Hawaiian or Pacific Islander alone (NH)	x	x	x	123	70	100	x	x	x	0.03%	0.02%	0.03%
Other race alone (NH)	1,943	692	473	827	599	1,970	0.26%	0.12%	0.09%	0.17%	0.15%	0.53%
Mixed race or Multiracial (NH)	x	x	x	8,093	7,484	14,261	x	x	x	1.69%	1.89%	3.83%
Hispanic or Latino (any race)	x	17,896	23,197	34,728	39,534	48,699	x	3.12%	4.59%	7.26%	9.96%	13.07%
Total	750,903	573,822	505,616	478,403	396,815	372,624	100.00%	100.00%	100.00%	100.00%	100.00%	100.00%

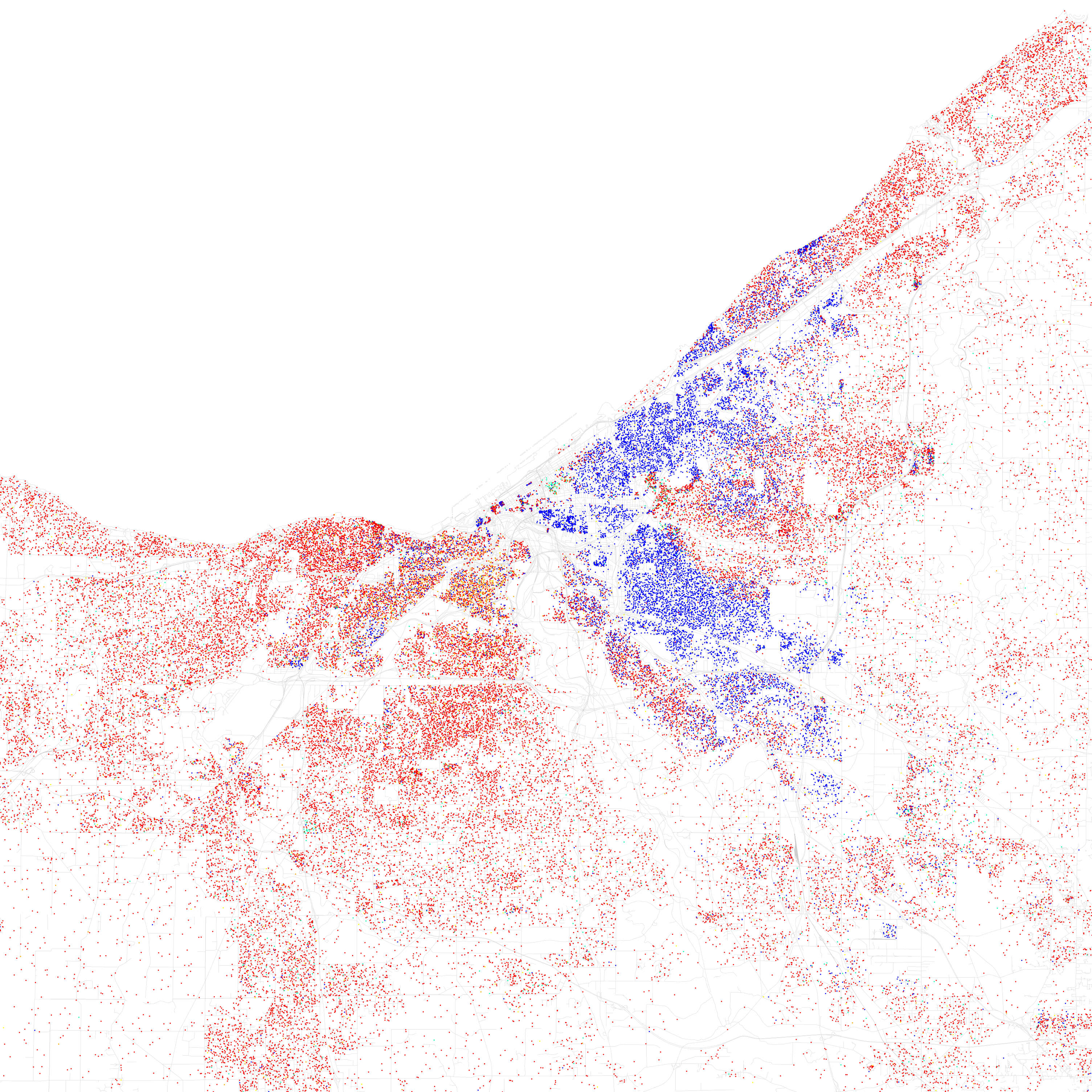
Map of racial distribution in Greater Cleveland, 2010 U.S. Census. Each dot is 25 people: ⬤ White ⬤ Black ⬤ Asian ⬤ Hispanic ⬤ Other

According to the 2020 census, the racial composition of the city was 32.1% non-Hispanic white, 47.5% African American (non-Hispanic), 2.8% Asian and Pacific Islander, 0.2% Native American, and 3.8% from two or more races. Hispanics or Latinos were 13.1% of the population. 14.7% spoke a language other than English at home, including Spanish, Arabic, Chinese, Albanian, and various Slavic languages (Russian, Polish, Serbo-Croatian, and Slovene). There is no ethnic or racial majority in Cleveland. A 2020 analysis found the city to be the most ethnically and racially diverse in Ohio.

Within Cleveland, the non-Hispanic white and Hispanic (of any race) populations are largely concentrated on the city's West Side, while the Black American population is largely concentrated on the East Side and the Asian population is mostly concentrated in the historical Asiatown neighborhood. The East–West racial divide is a legacy of redlining and blockbusting on Cleveland's East Side, and before the 1950s, such a division did not exist, as the poet Langston Hughes observed. However, the division is not absolute; there is a significant African American minority on the West Side, and the East Side neighborhood of University Circle is majority non-Hispanic white, with significant African American and Asian minorities. The city's Downtown is majority non-Hispanic white, with African American, Asian, and Hispanic minorities.

The demographic distribution has largely remained stable since the 1970s, although there have been significant shifts in the composition of certain neighborhoods, notably Collinwood and Broadway–Slavic Village. Cleveland's African American population increased from 235,405 (46.6%) in 1990 to 246,242 (51.0%) in 2000. However, due to increased African American migration to nearby East Side suburbs, the percentage of non-Hispanic African Americans in the city fell to 47.5% by 2020. Between 2010 and 2020, the decrease of the non-Hispanic white population slowed, while the Asian and especially Hispanic populations saw considerable growth.

In the 19th and early 20th centuries, Cleveland saw a massive influx of immigrants from Ireland, Italy, and the Austro-Hungarian, German, Russian, and Ottoman empires, most of whom were attracted by manufacturing jobs. In 1920, the city proper boasted a foreign-born population of 30% and, in 1870, that percentage was 42%. As a result of the U.S. immigration restrictions of 1921 and 1924 and the decline of industry, Cleveland's foreign-born population decreased over time and was 4.1% by 1990. In the late 2010s, the immigrant population of Cleveland and Cuyahoga County began to see significant growth. By 2020, the foreign-born population of Cleveland had increased to 6%, while the foreign-born population of Cuyahoga County was 7.6%. A 2019 study found Cleveland to be the city with the shortest average processing time in the nation for immigrants to become U.S. citizens.

In Cleveland and Cuyahoga County, most of the foreign-born are from Europe, the Middle East, East Asia, Latin America, and South Asia, with smaller numbers from Africa. Within Cleveland, the neighborhoods with the highest foreign-born populations are Asiatown/Goodrich–Kirtland Park (32.7%), Clark–Fulton (26.7%), West Boulevard (18.5%), Brooklyn Centre (17.3%), Downtown (17.2%), University Circle (15.9%, with 20% in Little Italy), and Jefferson (14.3%). Within Cuyahoga County, many Cleveland suburbs also boast high foreign-born populations, especially East Side suburbs such as Beachwood (17.11%), Mayfield Heights (16.36%), and Solon (15.56%) with their large communities of Russian-speaking immigrants from the post-Soviet states. On the West Side, the streetcar suburb of Lakewood also has a significant foreign-born population and has been recognized locally as a hotspot for immigrants.

=== European and Middle Eastern communities ===
The non-Hispanic white population is mostly concentrated on Cleveland's West Side, Downtown, and University Circle, and comprises 32.1% according to the 2020 census. This category, as defined by the U.S. Census Bureau, encompasses Cleveland's many ethnic European and Middle Eastern communities. Among them are Irish (especially in Kamm's Corners and other areas of West Park), Italians (especially in Little Italy and around Mayfield Road), Germans, and several Central-Eastern European ethnicities, including Czechs, Hungarians, Lithuanians, Poles, Romanians, Russians, Rusyns, Slovaks, Ukrainians, and ex-Yugoslav groups, such as Slovenes, Croats, and Serbs. The presence of Hungarians within Cleveland proper was, at one time, so great that the city boasted the highest concentration of Hungarians in the world outside of Budapest. Cleveland also has a long-established Jewish community, as well as significant communities of Albanians, Arabs (especially Lebanese, Syrians, and Palestinians), Armenians, French, Greeks, Iranians, Scots, and Turks. There was also a strong and large Spanish community between the two World Wars, until they integrated (like Irish, Germans or French did).

=== African American communities ===
According to the 2020 census, non-Hispanic African Americans comprise 47.5% of Cleveland's population. Black American communities have a long history in the city and grew significantly from 1910 to 1970 as a result of the First and Second Great Migrations. Most of the African American neighborhoods are on the East Side of Cleveland, but there are also significant communities on the West Side, particularly in the Bellaire–Puritas and Cudell neighborhoods. Cleveland also has small African (especially Ethiopian and Congolese) and West Indian immigrant populations.

=== Hispanic and Latino communities ===
According to the 2020 census, the city's Hispanic and Latino communities form 13.1% of the population and have seen dramatic growth in recent decades. According to the Cleveland City Planning Commission, "more than 1 out of 8 Clevelanders [were] Hispanic or Latino in 2020." The vast majority of Hispanics in Cleveland are of Puerto Rican descent, but there are also smaller numbers of immigrants from Mexico, Cuba, the Dominican Republic, South and Central America, and Spain. The Clark–Fulton neighborhood on the West Side has the highest concentration of Hispanics in Cleveland and Cuyahoga County. The adjacent West Side neighborhoods of Brooklyn Centre, Stockyards, West Boulevard, and Detroit–Shoreway also have significant Hispanic populations.

=== Asian and Pacific Islander communities ===
Cleveland's Asian and Pacific Islander communities comprise 2.8% of the city's population and have also been growing, according to the 2020 census. Most are centered on historical Asiatown and include Chinese, Koreans, Vietnamese, and other groups.

=== Romani ===
The Roma began settling on Cleveland's near west side in the 1880s, and within 40 years there were at least 1,000 Roma living in the Ohio City neighborhood. Cleveland's Romani population dwindled down to a few hundred by the 1970s. Some Roma moved to nearby West Side suburbs, while hundreds more chose to move to larger cities, such as New York City or Chicago.

=== Native Americans ===
The United States census figures put the Native American population of Greater Cleveland at 1,603 in the year 1980. In the 1990 U.S. census, the Native American population had increased to 2,706.

== See also ==
- Northeast Ohio
- Cleveland Cultural Gardens
