= Broadway Avenue Historic District (Cleveland) =

Historic district in Ohio, United States

- U.S. National Register of Historic Places
- U.S. Historic district
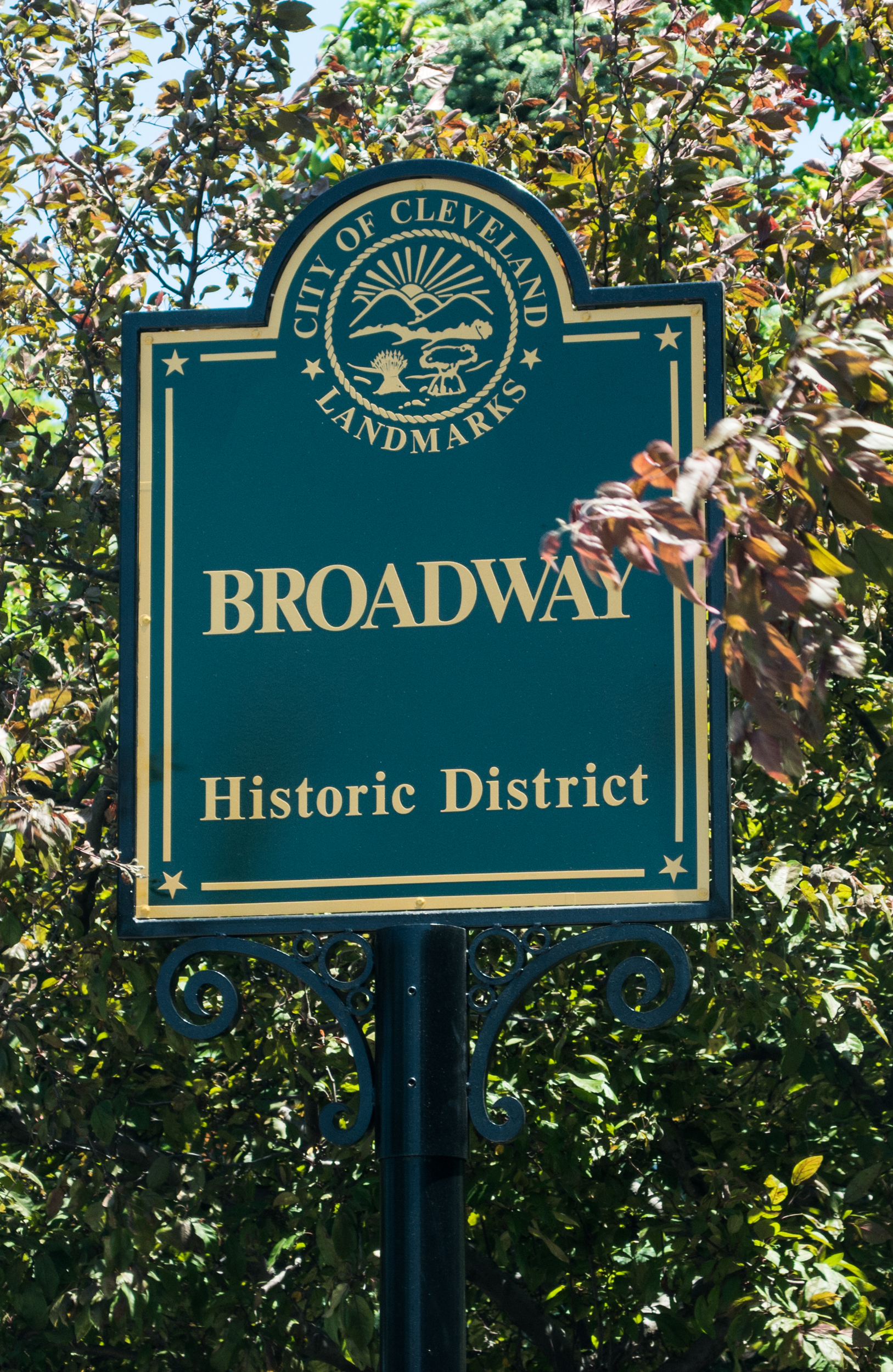
- Sign marking an entrance to the historic district

- Location within Cleveland Location within Ohio Location within the United States
- Location: Broadway Avenue between Barkwill Avenue and Cable Avenue; E. 55th Street from Lufkin Avenue to Broadway Avenue; Cleveland, Ohio
- Coordinates: 41°28′02″N 81°39′05″W
- Area: 8 acres (3.2 ha)
- Architectural style: Early Commercial, Italianate, Jacobean Revival, Neoclassical, Queen Anne, Renaissance Revival
- NRHP reference No.: 88001860
- Added to NRHP: October 19, 1988

The Broadway Avenue Historic District is a historic commercial district in the Broadway–Slavic Village neighborhood of Cleveland, Ohio, in the United States. The commercial district is the historic center of Cleveland's Czech community, and is an excellent example of a district that grew along a streetcar line. The historic district includes 43 buildings constructed between 1888 and 1930, including the Hruby Conservatory of Music and Our Lady of Lourdes Church and School. The commercial district was added to the National Register of Historic Places on October 19, 1988.

== Emergence of the historic district ==
In 1662, Charles II of England, ignoring existing Native American claims to the area, granted to the Connecticut Colony all lands to the west between the 41st and 42nd parallels of north latitude. These rights began at the western border of the Colony of Rhode Island and Providence Plantations and extended to the Pacific Ocean, although they did not include lands already ceded to the Province of New York or the Province of Pennsylvania. Unfortunately, Charles and other English monarchs had also pledged these same lands to the Massachusetts Bay Colony, Province of New York, Plymouth Colony, and the Colony of Virginia. In 1786, Connecticut ceded all its land claims to the federal government in exchange for cancellation of its American Revolutionary War debts. Connecticut retained only those lands known as the Connecticut Western Reserve, an area bounded by Lake Erie on the north, Pennsylvania on the east, and the 41st parallel of north latitude on the south. The Western Reserve extended for exactly 120 miles (190 km) to the west, and came to an abrupt halt. (Note: Connecticut later abandoned its claim to 500,000 acres (2,000 km^{2}) of land on the western end of the Western Reserve, turning these areas over to certain coastal towns in the state as reparations for damages suffered during the Revolutionary War.)

On August 3, 1795, the state of Connecticut sold the Western Reserve to the Connecticut Land Company for $1.2 million ($22,800,000 in 2025 dollars). In 1811, Youngs L. Morgan, Sr., an emigrant from Connecticut, purchased from the Connecticut Land Company 100 acres (400,000 m^{2}) of land around what is now the intersection of E. 55th Street and Broadway Avenues. He and his heirs continued to farm this land until 1872. Others who owned land nearby were Charles Barkwill (a brickmaker), Eliezar Cable (who founded an orchard and nursery), Samuel Dille, Sr., (whose 90-acre (360,000 m^{2}) farm straddled the intersection of Broadway and Dille Avenue), (Note: Dille, Douse, and Martin streets in the North Broadway neighborhood are named for members of the Dille family and its descendants.) Jabesh Gallup (who founded a nursery), Moses Jewett, and Simeon Streetor (who farmed 220 acres (890,000 m^{2}) along Broadway).

In 1808, James Kingsbury, a local judge and former military officer, gave 50 acres (200,000 m^{2}) of land at the intersection of Broadway and E. 55th to his son-in-law, Dyer Sherman (who had wed Kingsbury's daughter, Abigail). Sherman erected a tavern there, which became well known among residents of the area. In 1827, John L. Wightman purchased 10 acres (40,000 m^{2}) of land on the southwest side of Broadway Avenue between what is now McBride and Fowler Avenues. He erected Wightman's Tavern there, a waystation for travelers which became one of the most famous in the northeast Ohio.

In February 1849, construction began in Cleveland on the northern end of the Cleveland and Pittsburgh Railroad. (Construction on the southern leg began in Wellsville, Ohio, in July 1847.) The line reached Hudson, Ohio, in February 1851, and Freedom (now Alliance, Ohio) on July 4, 1851. The northern leg was connected to the southern leg in 1852. Development of the railroad spurred extensive industrial activity along Broadway Avenue, which it largely paralleled until reaching Bedford, Ohio. One of the most important of these was Grasselli Chemical, founded in 1856 by Eugene Grasselli. (Note: Grasselli Chemical grew to 14 separate plants by 1928, when it was sold to DuPont.)

For a short time in the late 1850s, the Cuyahoga County Fair was held at Broadway and E. 55th before moving to a more permanent home.

=== Early Czech settlements in Cleveland ===
Czech people were among the earliest groups to emigrate to the United States in large numbers, with the first wave of Czech immigration occurring in the 1850s. Large numbers of Czech people settled in Chicago, Illinois, and in St. Louis, Missouri. Many Czech immigrants headed for the Midwestern United States used Cleveland as a midway stopping point, intending to move on. But large numbers of Czechs actually settled in the city, and soon Cleveland had one of the largest Czech populations in the nation.

The first Czech neighborhoods in Cleveland were on the east bank of the Cuyahoga River in an area bounded by Hill, Cross, and Commercial streets. (Note: This is now the site of the Tower City Center complex.) By 1853, two more small Czech communities had been built on west bank of the Cuyahoga River south of Ohio City, in what are now the Clark-Fulton and Brooklyn Centre neighborhoods. Many Czech immigrants to Cleveland at this time had been farmers. Cleveland farmer Harvey Rice employed many Czech agricultural laborers, and allowed them to purchase farmland from him at reasonable prices. Over the years, a large Czech community grew up around the intersection of E. 37th Street and Croton Avenue north of Kingsbury Run. The first Catholic church to serve Cleveland's burgeoning Czech community was St. Wenceslas Church, constructed in 1867 at the intersection of E. 35th Street and Burwell Avenue (a block north-northwest of E. 37th and Croton). (Note: The second Catholic church to minister to Czechs, St. Procop Roman Catholic Church, was constructed on Cleveland's west side at 3181 W. 41st Street in 1872. It closed in 2009. The first non-Catholic Christian church to serve Czech Americans in Cleveland was Cyril Chapel, a Congregational church which was constructed at 3123 W. 43rd Street and which was completed in July 1887. Although the congregation ceased to exist about 1940, the building still stands.)

The Croton Czech settlement remained the center of Czech life in Cleveland until the late 1870s. On January 10, 1870, John D. Rockefeller and his partners established the Standard Oil company. By March 1872, Standard Oil had absorbed nearly every other petroleum refining company in Cleveland and had a national monopoly on oil refining. At this time, refined petroleum products were still primarily delivered in wooden barrels, and Standard Oil began employing large numbers of Czech Americans as coopers (barrel makers). More and more Czech Americans and Czech immigrants settled in the Croton area due to Standard Oil's need for workers. The Warren School, an elementary school that was the first public school in the North Broadway area, was established in 1871 just north of the intersection of Warren Avenue and Dille Street. (The site is now beneath the Interstate 77-Interstate 490 interchange.)

=== Creation of the Broadway district ===
Four factors encouraged the growth of the Czech community south of the Croton neighborhood, and the creation of the Broadway commercial district. First, several farms south of Kingsbury Run were subdivided into smaller parcels and into housing plots beginning in 1878. This put this land into the price range of the average worker. (Note: The land encompassing the Broadway Avenue Historic District was owned and subdivided by Herman L. Morgan, grandson of Youngs L. Morgan, Sr.) Second, a number of new bridges were built over Kingsbury Run in the area, permitting north–south traffic. This allowed workers to move out of the over-crowded Croton area while retaining easy access to their jobs at the Standard Oil plant north of the stream. Third, the rapidly growing Standard Oil refineries, with their concomitant noise and pollution, encouraged residents to leave the Croton area for neighborhoods further away. Fourth, a new wave of Czech immigration to Cleveland began in 1870, and these new immigrants needed homes and land to live on.

The first new substantial Czech American settlement south of Kingsbury Run was at the intersection of Trumbull Avenue and E. 37th Street. This neighborhood became known in Czech as Na Vrsku (On the Hill). In 1892, St. Wenceslas Church began construction of a new church at the intersection of E. 37th Street and Broadway, a block south of Trumbull Avenue. (This structure was not completed until 1899, although services began to be held there much earlier than that). The country road that became Broadway Avenue had existed since the early part of the 1800s, and as more and more Czech Americans moved into the area, development began moving south down Broadway. Czech immigrants brought with them a cultural legacy of gardening, and most new homes in the area consisted of small cottages with front and back yard flower and kitchen gardens. New streets were constructed, many with Czech names like Praha and Svoboda. Bohemian National Hall, believed by historians to be the first structure in Cleveland erected by an immigrant group, was constructed at the intersection of Broadway and Mead Avenues in 1897. Banks, churches, and retail stores were built along Broadway Avenue, and by 1900 the intersection of E. 55th and Broadway had emerged as the center of the new Czech community—supplanting the earlier concentration of homes and businesses at Broadway and Trumbull.

== History of the Broadway Historic District ==
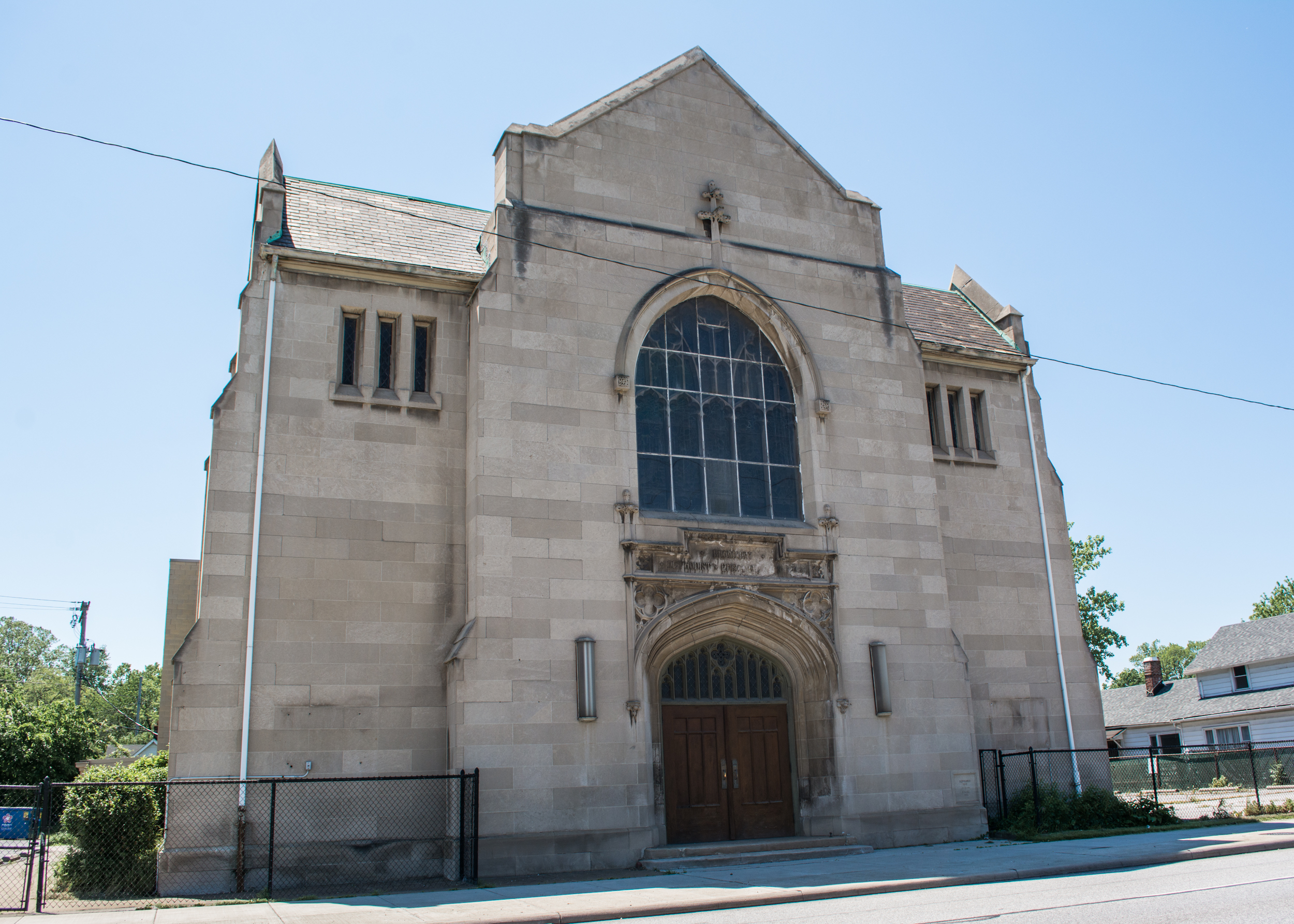
Broadway Methodist Church

Known as Žižkov, (Note: Žižkov was, until 1922, a city on the outskirts of Prague. It was historically working-class and left-wing, and had a reputation as a rough area. It had undergone a tremendous explosion in population between 1865 and 1880. There were clear parallels in the development between Czech Žižkov and Cleveland's Žižkov neighborhood.) the commercial district on Broadway Avenue began at E. 37th Street and ended at Union Avenue.

=== Growth: 1870 to 1900 ===
In the 1870s, there were three major developments in the area. The first was the construction in 1872 of Broadway Methodist Church at 5246 Broadway. By 1920, it was the largest non-Catholic Czech church in Cleveland, and one of the richest. A wealthy member paid several artists to travel to Italy in 1957 to measure and study the Leonardo da Vinci's The Last Supper and paint a life-size copy over the altar at Broadway Methodist. (The replica remains the largest and most accurate Last Supper in the United States.) The burgeoning community received its first public school in 1875 when the city erected South School (later renamed Barkwill School) on the northwest corner of Dolloff Road and Barkwill Avenue, a block southwest of Broadway. The southern edge of the district became defined in March 1880 when Joseph Turner & Sons Manufacturing Company opened its first woolen mill on the southwest corner of Blanche Avenue and Broadway. (Note: The company was reorganized in 1895 and renamed The Turner Worsted Co. Turner went bankrupt in 1893, was purchased by new investors, and became the Cleveland Worsted Mill Co.)

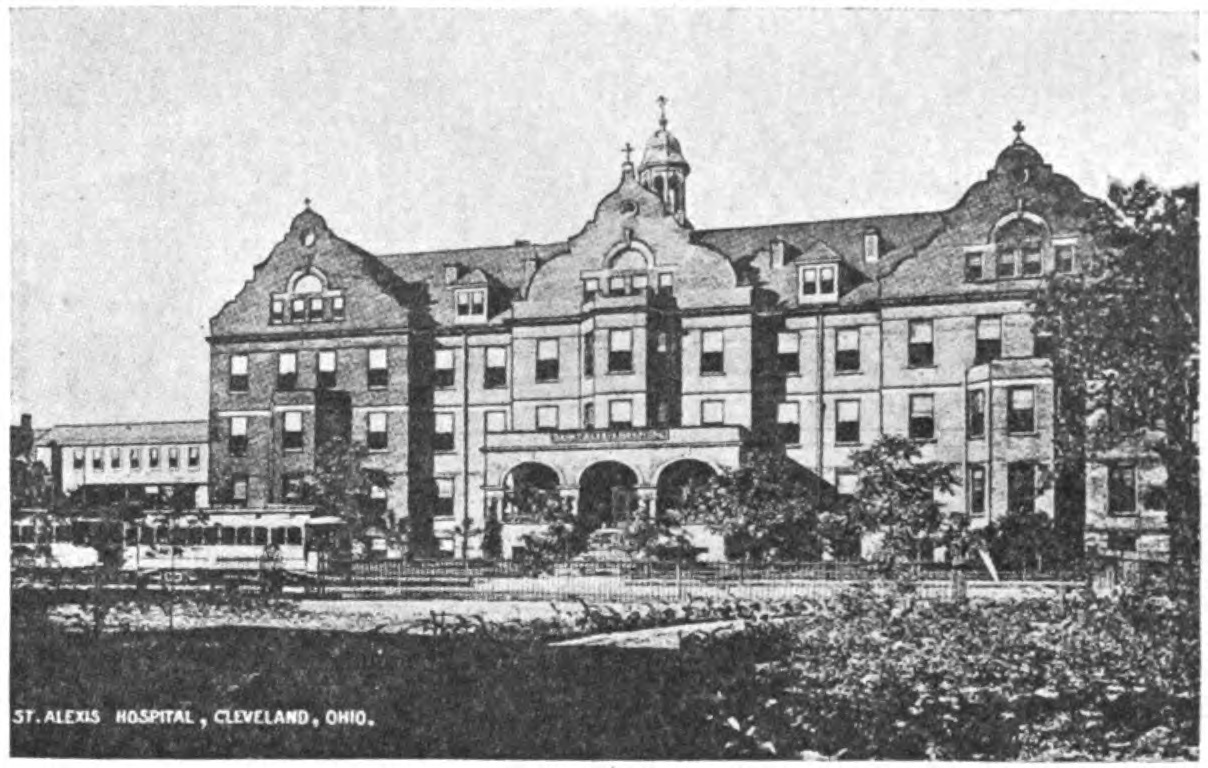
St. Alexis Hospital in 1918

The 1880s saw the area receive its first law enforcement presence, when Police Station No. 4 was built in 1883 at 3355 E. 55th Street. Other retail businesses on E. 55th just north of the police station were Janouseck's millinery shop, Eyerdam's barber shop, Kumler's carriage shop, Yost's livery stable, and several funeral homes catering specifically to the Czech community. Five major new developments also occurred in the 1880s. The first of these was the erection in 1883 of the area's second public school, the Fowler School, on the southeast corner of Fowler Avenue and Hector Street (a block northeast of Broadway). The second development was the establishment of Broadway Bank in 1883. Founded by Oliver Meade Stafford and Charles Grasselli (owner of nearby Grasselli Chemicals), it was one of first suburban banks in the United States and the first suburban bank in Cleveland. Its headquarters were at 5455 Broadway Avenue, facing the intersection of Broadway and E. 55th. Later known as the Broadway Savings and Trust Company, the bank became one of the strongest in city, largely due to Czech American business. The third major development was the erection in 1884 of St. Alexis Hospital at 5163 Broadway Avenue. Only the second Catholic hospital in Cleveland, it initially occupied an eight-room brick house. Construction began on a 32-bed acute-care hospital in 1885. The world's first human-to-human blood transfusion occurred at St. Alexis in 1906. The fourth development was the incorporation in December 1886 of the Canfield Oil Company. This new refinery was erected in 1887 on the northeast corner of the intersection of Lufkin Avenue and E. 55th Street. The last development of the decade occurred in 1889, when St. Johannes Evangelical Lutheran Church was built on Cable Avenue a half block northeast of Broadway.

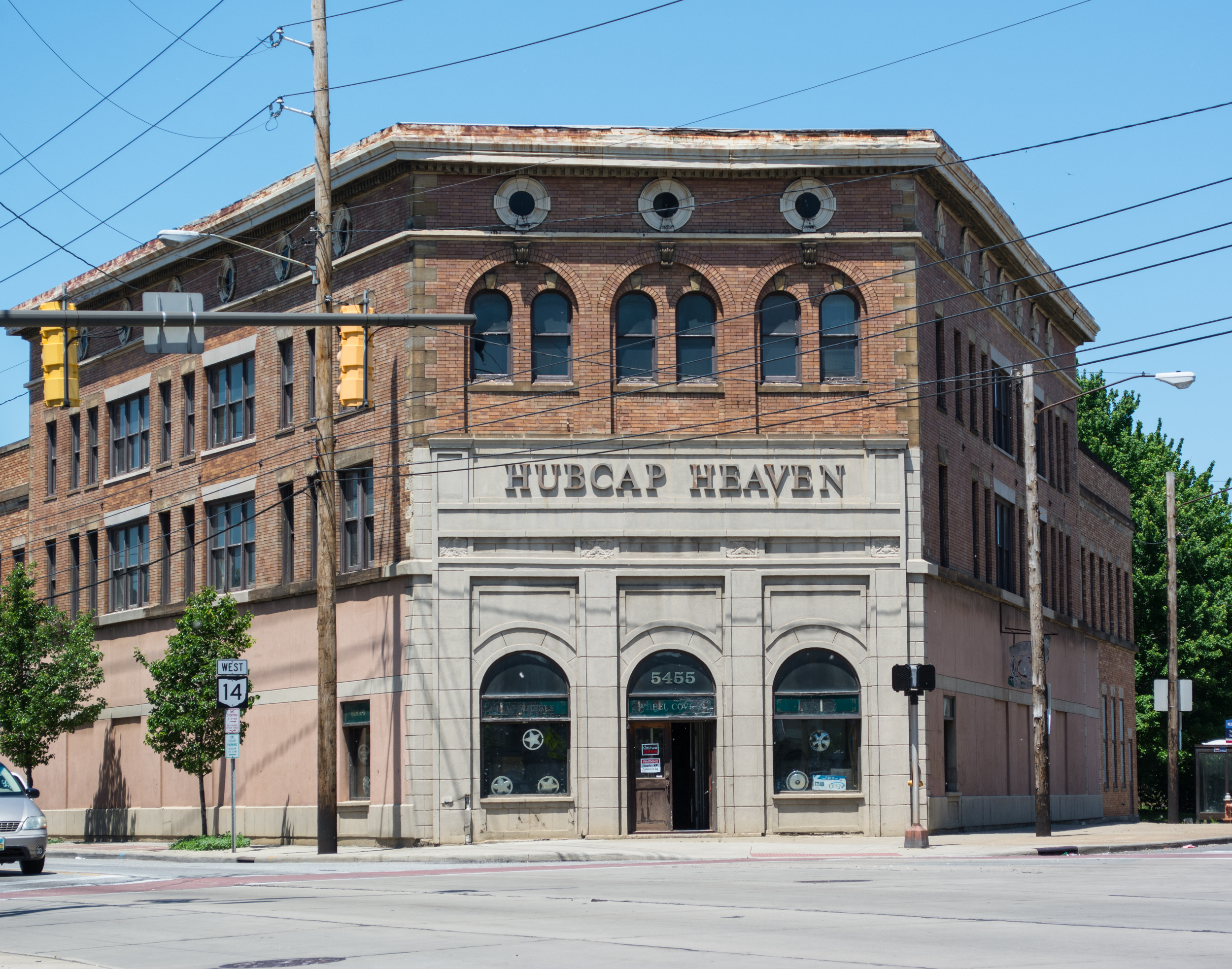
The Broadway Bank building, which as of 2017 houses Hubcap Heaven

The 1890s saw the erection of Our Lady of Lourdes Church, one of the most prominent structures in the neighborhood. The swiftly-growing Czech American community south of St. Wenceslas moved the Roman Catholic Diocese of Cleveland to establish a new parish to serve the middle-Broadway area. In 1882, the diocese authorized Rev. Anton Hynek to purchase property at E. 55th and Hamm Avenue for the new parish. Bishop Richard Gilmour recruited Czech seminarian Stephen Furdek to minister to the new parish. While on his way to the United States, Furdek visited the Our Lady of Lourdes Shrine near the town of Lourdes in France. Furdek promised the Virgin Mary to name the new parish after Our Lady of Lourdes. Although the parish was formally established in 1883, construction of the Gothic Revival church, designed by architects Emile Ulrich and Bernard Van De Velde, did not begin until 1891. Our Lady of Lourdes Church became a central institution in the community. Under Furdek's pastoral care, it grew to more than 6,000 parishioners by 1920. It sponsored more than 45 different chapters, groups, societies and other associated membership organizations, including book groups, a musical drama society, a hunters' and fishers' group, a forestry association, a gymnastics club, and an organization designed to encourage youth to join the military. Our Lady of Lourdes School (which taught first through sixth grades) was founded adjacent to the church in 1905, and staffed by the Sisters of Notre Dame de Namur. Between 1915 and 1955, a convent, gymnasium, and rectory were all added to the Lourdes campus. Instruction in grades seven through nine was added in 1939, and a high school in 1944.

Other major developments in the 1890s included the establishment of Columbia Savings and Loan (located at E. 55th and Broadway) in 1891, the initiation of streetcar service along Broadway to Union Avenue in 1893, the founding of Vcela Savings and Loan in March 1896 at 5733 Broadway, and the first publication of the American, a daily Czech-language newspaper, in 1899 at its headquarters at 5377 Broadway. In time, the American became one of the three largest non-English-language newspapers in the city.

=== Acme of the district: 1900 to 1930 ===
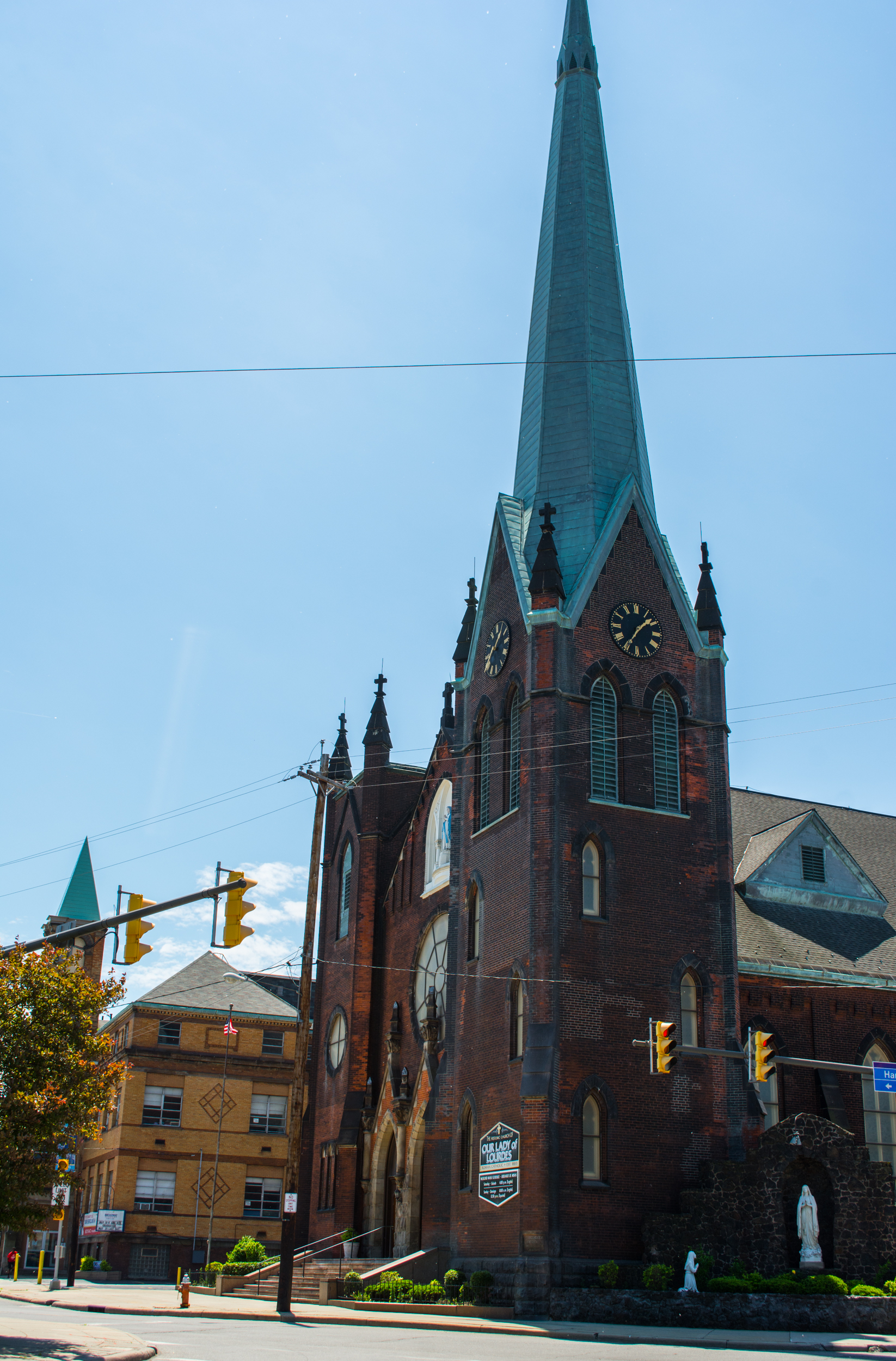
Our Lady of Lourdes Church in 2017.

The first two decades of the 20th century mark the high point of the Broadway Historic District's existence. A third wave of Czech immigration to Cleveland began in 1900, drawn by the growing steel industry in the city. These immigrants were remarkably well-educated, with a literacy rate of 98.5 percent (greater than that of most other Americans). The accommodate strong community demand, the Cleveland Public Library established the Broadway Branch Library in 1902 at 5437 Broadway Avenue. The building was a unique structure with 10 sides, and as of 2009 was one of the few 10-sided buildings still standing in the United States.

By 1910, Cleveland had the largest Czech community in the United States. The Žižkov community was so large and economically and politically powerful that a city newspaper quipped, "There is no truth in the rumor that the capital of the Czechoslovak Republic will be removed from Prague to the neighborhood of Broadway and E. 55th streets, Cleveland."

On April 14, 1912, the Olympia Theatre opened at 3335 E. 55th Street. Designed by architect George Allen Grieble, the 2,000-seat theater occupied 200 feet (61 m) of E. 55th Street and 250 feet (76 m) of Hamlet Avenue. It featured a $10,000 ($300,000 in 2025 dollars) Moller pipe organ, interior design by Sterling & Welch, and a luxurious theater curtain and drapes by The May Co. A mixed-use development, the building featured room on the first floor for eight retail stores, and 30 apartments on the second and third floors.

The second wave of Czech immigration ended in 1914 with the outbreak of World War I. The Broadway area continued to grow for a time, however, and by 1920 the two blocks north and south of Broadway and E. 55th boasted six banks. Among the new banks founded during the 1910s was the Atlas Savings and Loan, founded in 1915. Located at 5454 Broadway Avenue, this bank proved to be the fastest-growing of the new financial institutions. The bank later funded construction of the Atlas Building at 5644 Broadway, which served as its home until 1921. The Atlas Building served as the headquarters of the Progress Savings and Loan from 1921 to 1939, and from 1939 to 1960 as the headquarters of the Czech Catholic Union. Another bank founded at this time was the Oul Building and Loan company at 5638 Broadway (Note: "Oul" is a Czech word meaning "owl".) which was incorporated in December 1915.

Probulov Hall, a Czech community meeting place at 5284 Broadway, was constructed in 1915. On October 22, 1915, Czechs and Slovaks signed the Cleveland Agreement at Bohemian National Hall. The agreement called for a federal Czech and Slovak state, and this led to the Pittsburgh Agreement of 1918. The Pittsburgh Agreement led directly to the formation of an independent Czechoslovakia after World War I.

Some of the last major institutions in the Broadway Historic District were founded in the early 1920s. These included Bethlehem Chapel, a Congregational church which opened in 1921 at the intersection of Broadway and Fowler Avenues, and Tate Field. Tate Field was an athletic field created in February 1921 to serve as the home field of the Cleveland Tate Stars, a Negro National League professional baseball league. The team folded in 1924, and the field was renamed Hooper Field (also referred to as Slavia Hooper Field). On September 26, 1926, more than 6,000 people watched Sparta, a professional soccer team from Prague, defeat the Ohio All-Stars 6-to-2 at Hooper Field.

At the close of the 1920s, the Broadway commercial district was home to numerous bakeries, banks, businesses, and music stores. It was the largest shopping district out of Cleveland's downtown, and with 90,000 residents in the area North Broadway was the second-largest Czech community in the United States (only Chicago was larger). The Czech and other Slavic communities in the area had had a "profound effect on the development of Cleveland".

=== Decline: 1930s to 2000s ===
The Great Depression bankrupted many of the banks and merchants in the Broadway retail corridor, but the street managed to remain an important shopping area into the 1940s. Hooper Field closed in 1936. One bright spot was the founding of Third Federal Savings and Loan in 1938. Its conservative lending policies allowed it to survive the Great Depression, and by the 21st century it had grown into an $11 billion corporation.

The area went into a long decline after World War II. In 1940, the area had 21,003 residents. But from 1945 to 1970, the Cleveland area shed most of is heavy industry, and the loss of industrial jobs hit the North Broadway neighborhood particularly hard. Cleveland also suffered significantly from a strong trend toward suburbanization, and by 1970 the Broadway district had lost 36 percent of its population. Redlining in lending caused further economic harm, as banks denied loans to retailers and individuals in the poverty-stricken area.

Pollution also proved to be a significant problem in the area. By 1920, North Broadway had become wedged between the giant steel factories of Jones and Laughlin Steel and Republic Steel. Heavy smoke and fumes did significant environmental damage to the area, destroying gardens and trees. No action was taken during the Great Depression to mitigate this pollution, as the city valued what few jobs the steel mills could provide over quality of life issues. Environmental concerns became more prominent in the 1950s, but city leaders believed that a laissez-faire approach to regulation was essential to the city's continued growth. The heavy pollution drove many residents out of the area.

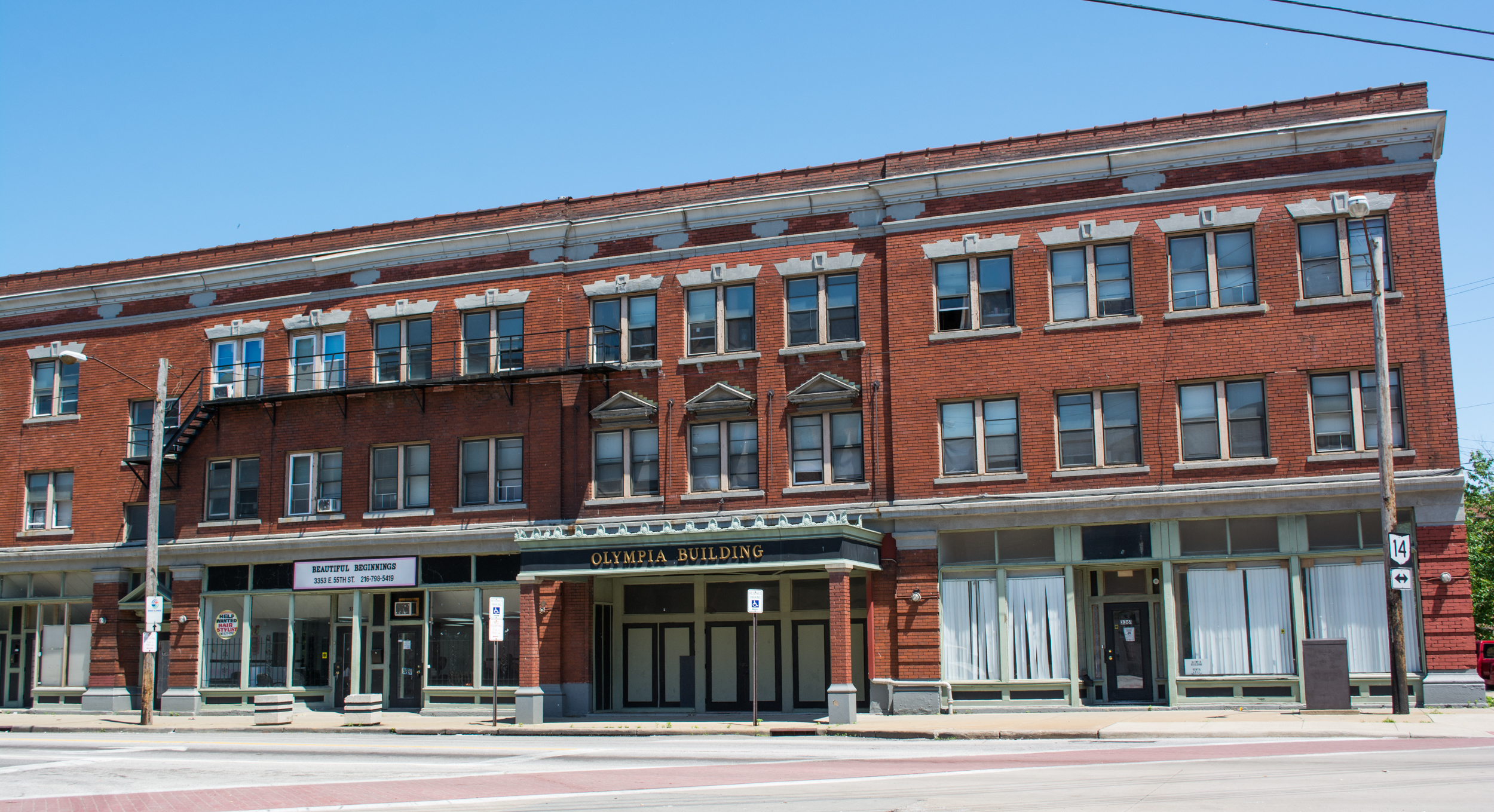
The Olympia Theatre Building in 2017

Highway construction also created significant problems for the retail district. In 1955, federal, state, and regional highway planners proposed construction of an interstate highway across the southern part of Cleveland. Known primarily as the Clark Freeway, the six-lane limited-access freeway would begin West Boulevard in the Cudell neighborhood; cut across the Detroit-Shoreway, Ohio City, and Tremont neighborhoods; bridge Industrial Valley and the Cuyahoga River; and then cut across the North Broadway, Kinsman, Woodland Hills, and Buckeye-Shaker neighborhoods before exiting the city and connecting with Lee Road in the adjacent suburb of Cleveland Heights. A second interstate highway, the Willow Freeway, would begin near Lake Erie at the Cleveland Memorial Shoreway, largely follow the border between Downtown Cleveland/Goodrich–Kirtland Park and Industrial Valley/North Broadway, and cut across South Broadway before exiting the city and cutting through the towns of Newburgh Heights and Cuyahoga Heights to connect with a new "outer belt" east-west freeway in northern Independence, Ohio. A total of 465 homes, churches, and businesses were demolished between Broadway/E. 37th Street and Broadway/Gallup Avenue, including St. Wenceslas Church (which closed in 1962). Construction began in April 1964, and the north-south I-77 portion of the interchange completed in November 1965. The eastern portion of the interchange, I-490 connecting E. 55th Street with I-77, opened about July 31, 1966. But the bridge over Industrial Valley connecting the interchange to Interstate 90 was not opened until September 1990. Strong opposition to the extension of I-490 past E. 55th Street resulted in the cancellation of the route.

Our Lady of Lourdes High School closed in the fall of 1969 and merged with Cleveland Central Catholic High School.

The Broadway retail corridor's decline worsened in the 1970s and 1980s. By 1990, just 8,852 people lived in North Broadway, a nearly 45 percent decline in 20 years. In the 1970s, the term "Slavic Village" was coined to promote the area. Slavic Village encompass the neighborhood of North Broadway and Union-Miles Park as well as portions of Kinsman and South Broadway. These areas were all Eastern European ethnic neighborhoods in steep decline.

The Olympia Theatre closed on March 4, 1981, after a short-lived attempt to survive as an adult movie theater. Efforts to redevelop the building began in 1983, but it was not until 1987 that the new owners received property tax credits which enabled the renovation to move forward. While the apartments and retail space were refurbished, the theater itself was razed for parking (although the lobby was saved).

=== Great Recession: 2000 to present ===
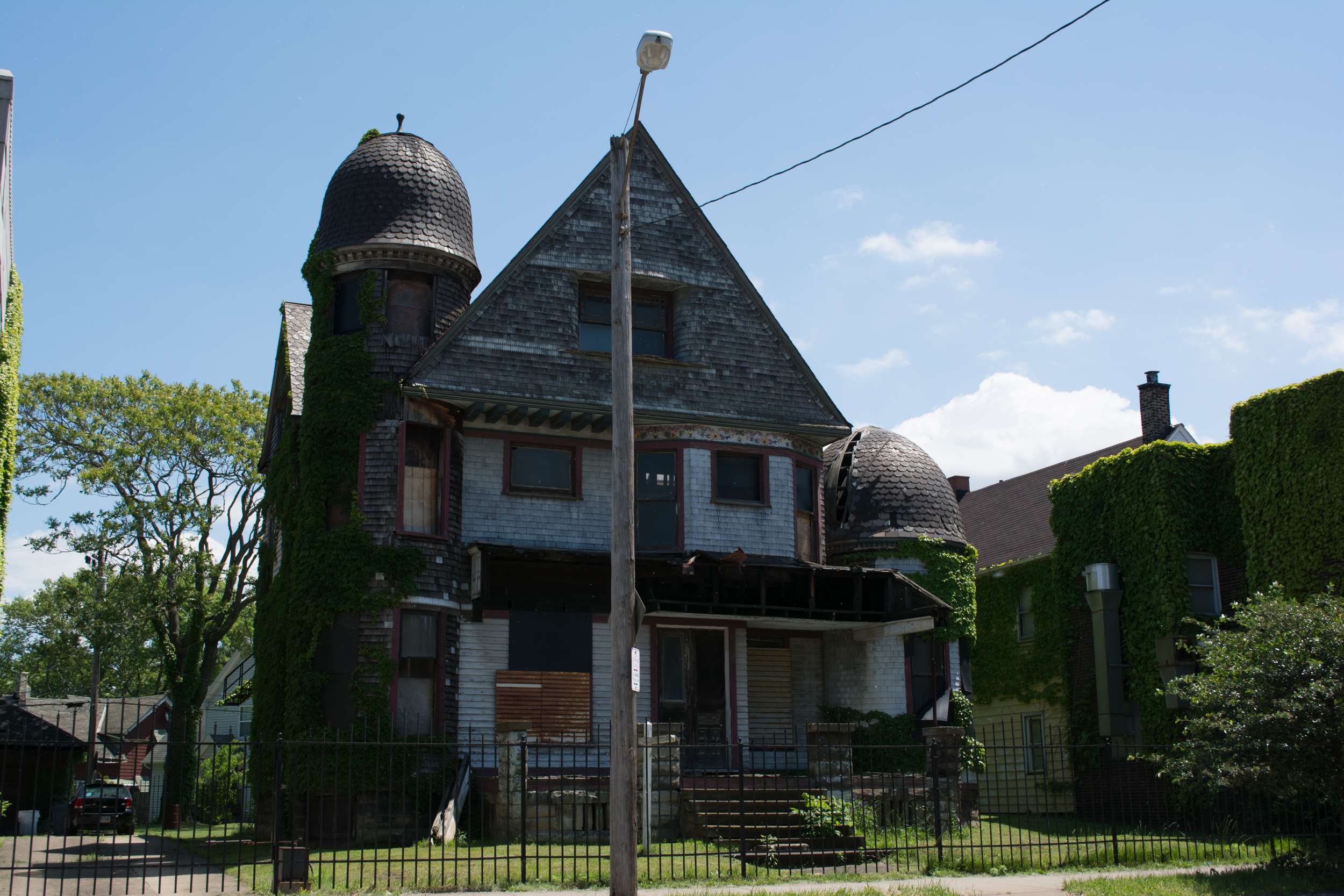
A vacant, crumbling Bohemian-style home on E. 55th Street

The Broadway retail district began to under a slight renaissance in the 1990s. This was primarily due to the work of Slavic Village Development, a community development corporation founded in 1980.

St. Alexis was one of the largest positive economic drivers of the retail district. Over the past century, the hospital had added a nursing school (1918), medical building (1955), and service wing with an emergency room, maternity ward, and radiology department (1959). But the hospital was in financial difficulty by the late 1980s. In June 1994, for-profit, Pennsylvania-based Primary Health Systems (PHS) purchased the hospital and renamed it St. Michael Hospital. PHS went bankrupt in 1999, With the hospital about to close, University Hospitals of Cleveland purchased St. Michael's and another PHS hospital in Cleveland for $12 million in May 2000. But losses at the hospital continued, and it finally closed for good on December 19, 2003. The city of Cleveland purchased the hospital campus and razed all the buildings there in 2007.

Improvements in the area led to a real estate bubble. Between 2005 and 2006, 68 percent of all loans made in the Slavic Village area were predatory. The widespread predatory lending and sweeping extent of foreclosures in Slavic Village led the mass media to declare the area the "epicenter of the Great Recession". Spurred by the financial crisis, Slavic Village lost 30 percent of its population over the next decade.

In 2010, Broadway United Methodist closed. The North Broadway neighborhood's population had dropped to 9,000 residents. The population would have dropped to almost 6,000 but for the influx of about 3,000 African Americans, drawn to the area by the exceptionally inexpensive housing made available by the foreclosure crisis. Once overwhelmingly white, North Broadway was by 2010 50 percent white and 40 percent black, and an extraordinary 38 percent of its residents had incomes below the poverty line.

Despite the challenges facing the area, the heart of the Czech community in Cleveland remained centered on E. 55th Street and Broadway Avenue into the 21st century, and had by one historian's account become "famous".

== About the historic district ==
The Broadway Historic District was added to the National Register of Historic Places on October 19, 1988. It consists of two primary streets: Broadway Avenue between Cable Avenue and Barkwill Avenue, and E. 55th Street between Lufkin Avenue and Broadway Avenue.

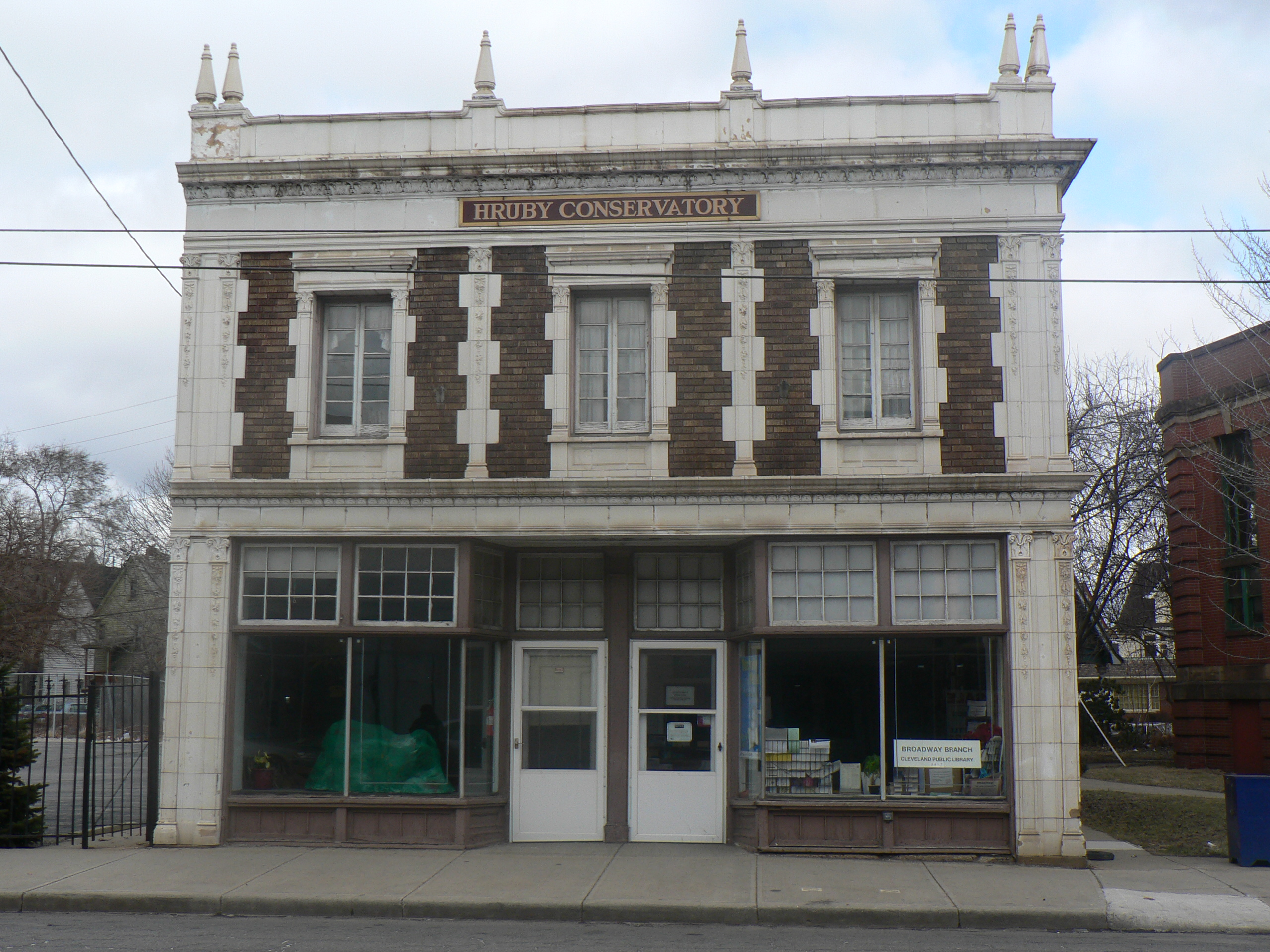
Hruby Conservatory of Music

The historic district contains 43 commercial buildings constructed between 1888 and 1930, Our Lady of Lourdes Church, and Our Lady of Lourdes School. Architectural styles represented include Early Commercial, Italianate, Neoclassical, Queen Anne, Renaissance Revival, and Jacobean Revival. Buildings range in height from one to six stories, and all of them front directly onto the sidewalk with no setback. Among the buildings included in the historic district are:

- Broadway Branch, Cleveland Public Library (1902; Neoclassical; Charles Morris, architect) (Note: Sources place its construction in 1902.)
- Federman Building (1907; style not known; Joseph Linck, architect)
- Hruby Conservatory of Music (1912; Jacobean Revival; Steffens & Steffens, architects)
- Melzer Building (1909; style not known; J.W. Hradek, architect)
- Olympia Theatre (1912; style not known; George Allen Grieble, architect)
- Our Lady of Lourdes Church (1891; Gothic Revival; Emile Ulrich and Bernard Van De Velde, architects)
- Our Lady of Lourdes School (1906; Renaissance Revival; Emile Ulrich and William Jansen, architects) (Note: The elementary school's construction was 1906, contrary to the claim made by Chatman in The Plain Dealer. The Cleveland City Planning Commission lists Emile Ulrich and Willian Jansen as co-designers of the school.)
- Zverina Block (1889; Eastlake movement of the Queen Anne Style; Andrew Mitermiler, architect)

The Broadway Historic District was named a Cleveland Landmark in November 1990. The district is part of Cleveland's Broadway-Slavic Village Statistical Planning Area. Broadway Avenue forms the center of this planning area.

== Bibliography ==
- Aalbers, Manuel B. (2013). "How Do Mortgage Lenders Influence Neighbourhood Dynamics? Redlining and Predatory Lending". In van Ham, Maarten; Manley, David; Bailey, Nick; Simpson, Ludi; Maclennan, Duncan (eds.). Understanding Neighbourhood Dynamics: New Insights for Neighbourhood Effects Research. Dordrecht, Netherlands: Springer. ISBN 9789400748538.
- Armstrong, Foster; Klein, Richard; Armstrong, Cara (1992). A Guide to Cleveland's Sacred Landmarks. Kent, Ohio: Kent State University Press. ISBN 9780873384544.
- Ayers, Edward L.; Gould, Lewis L.; Oshinsky, David M.; Soderland, Jean R. (2006). American Passages: A History of the United States. Boston, Mass.: Wadsworth/Cengage Learning. ISBN 9780618914067.
- Becker, Thea Gallo (2004). Cleveland, 1796-1929. Charleston, S.C.: Arcadia Publishing. ISBN 9780738532677.
- Beneš, Jakub S. (2017). Workers and Nationalism: Czech and German Social Democracy in Habsburg Austria, 1890-1918. Oxford, U.K.: Oxford University Press. ISBN 9780198789291.
- Benton-Short, Lisa (2014). Cities of North America: Contemporary Challenges in U.S. and Canadian Cities. Lanham, Md.: Rowman & Littlefield. ISBN 9781442213135.
- Board of Education (1877). Cleveland Public Schools Annual Report. Cleveland: Leader Printing Company.
- Board of Education (1884). Cleveland Public Schools Annual Report. Cleveland: Leader Printing Company.
- Chernow, Ron (2004). Titan: The Life of John D. Rockefeller, Sr. New York: Vintage Books. ISBN 9781400077304.
- The Cleveland Directory for the Year Ending July 31, 1884. Volume XIII. Cleveland: Cleveland Directory Co. 1883.
- The Cleveland Directory for the Year Ending July, 1890. Volume XIX. Cleveland: Cleveland Directory Co. 1889.
- Cleveland Foundation (1921). The Cleveland Year Book. Cleveland: The Cleveland Foundation.
- Cohen, Dana (June 2009). Illegal Flipping and Neighborhood Inequality: A Slavic Village Case Study (Department of Sociology Honors Thesis). hdl:1811/37107.
- Ellis, Lloyd H. Jr. (2012). A Guide to Greater Cleveland's Sacred Landmarks. Kent, Ohio: Kent State University Press. ISBN 9781606351215.
- Habenicht, Jan (1996). History of Czechs in America. St. Paul, Minn.: Czechoslovak Genealogical Society International. ISBN 9780965193207.
- Hatcher, Harlan (1988). "Building the Railroads". In Lupold, Harry Forrest; Haddad, Gladys (eds.). Ohio's Western Reserve: A Regional Reader. Kent, Ohio: Kent State University Press. ISBN 9780873383639.
- Hoelzel, Nathanael Z. (April 17, 2006). Environmental Review Action Memorandum (ERAM) (PDF) (Report). Cleveland: Cuyahoga County Department of Development. p. 4.
- Keating, W. Dennis (2016). A Brief History of Tremont: Cleveland's Neighborhood on a Hill. Charleston, S.C.: The History Press. ISBN 9781626197855.
- Ledbetter, Eleanor Edwards (1919). The Czechs of Cleveland. Cleveland: Mayor's Advisory War Committee.
- Litt, Vel (2000). Orange Township: Between the River and the Wooded Hills. Chicago: Arcadia Publishing. ISBN 9780738507309.
- Lupold, Harry Forrest; Haddad, Gladys (1988). "Conquest and Settlement: Native Americans to New Englanders". In Lupold, Harry Forrest; Haddad, Gladys (eds.). Ohio's Western Reserve: A Regional Reader. Kent, Ohio: Kent State University Press. ISBN 9780873383639.
- Memorial Record of the County of Cuyahoga and City of Cleveland, Ohio. Chicago: Lewis Publishing Co. 1894.
- Mitchell, Sandy (2009). Cleveland's Slavic Village. Charleston, S.C.: Arcadia Publishing. ISBN 9780738560694.
- Morris, Charles R. (2006). The Tycoons: How Andrew Carnegie, John D. Rockefeller, Jay Gould, and J.P. Morgan Invented the American Supereconomy. New York: Owl Books. ISBN 9781429935029.
- Ohio Division of Building and Loan Associations (1929). Annual Report of the Superintendent of Building and Loan Associations of the State of Ohio. Columbus, Ohio: The Kelly-Springfield Printing Company.
- Ohio Historic Places Dictionary. Hamburg, Mich.: State History Publications. 2008. ISBN 9781878592705.
- Ohio Secretary of State (1881). Annual Report of the Secretary of State to the Governor of Ohio for the Year 1880. Columbus, Ohio: G.J. Brand & Co, State Printers. hdl:2027/nyp.33433066423652.
- Ohio Secretary of State (1887). Annual Report of the Secretary of State to the Governor of Ohio for the Year 1887. Columbus, Ohio: The Westbote Co., State Printers.
- Orth, Samuel Peter (1910). A History of Cleveland, Ohio. Volume II: Biography. Chicago: S.J. Clarke Publishing Co.
- Powell, John (2005). Encyclopedia of North American Immigration. New York: Facts On File. ISBN 9780816046584.
- Reese, John S. (2002). Guide Book for the Tourist and Traveler Over the Valley Railway: The Short Line Between Cleveland, Akron, and Canton. Kent, Ohio: Kent State University Press. ISBN 9780873387354.
- Sabol, John T.; Alzo, Lisa A. (2009). Cleveland Czechs. Charleston, S.C.: Arcadia Publishing. ISBN 9780738552439.
- Sanders, Craig (2009). Canton Area Railroads. Charleston, S.C.: Arcadia Publishing. ISBN 9780738561110.
- Sanders, Craig (2014). Cleveland Mainline Railroads. Charleston, S.C.: Arcadia Publishing. ISBN 9781467111379.
- Schauffler, H.A. (March 1891). "The Germ and Center of Our Slavic Work and What Has Come of It". The Home Missionary. pp. 484–487.
- Stradling, David; Stradling, Richard (2015). Where the River Burned: Carl Stokes and the Struggle to Save Cleveland. Ithaca, N.Y.: Cornell University Press. ISBN 9780801453618.
- Taxel, Laura (2009). Cleveland Ethnic Eats. Cleveland: Gray & Company. ISBN 9781598510539.
- Thomas, Dale (2016). Cleveland in World War I. Charleston, S.C.: Arcadia Publishing. ISBN 9781467116930.
- Wickham, Gertrude Van Rensselaer (1914). The Pioneer Families of Cleveland 1796-1840. Volume 1. Cleveland: Evangelical Publishing House.
- Wickham, Gertrude Van Rensselaer (1914). The Pioneer Families of Cleveland 1796-1840. Volume 2. Cleveland: Evangelical Publishing House. hdl:2027/yale.39002008274905.
- Wilson, Neil; Baker, Mark (2010). Prague: City Guide. Oakland, Calif.: Lonely Planet. ISBN 9781741796681.
