= Bohemian National Hall (Cleveland) =

- Bohemian National Hall (Cleveland, Ohio)
- U.S. National Register of Historic Places
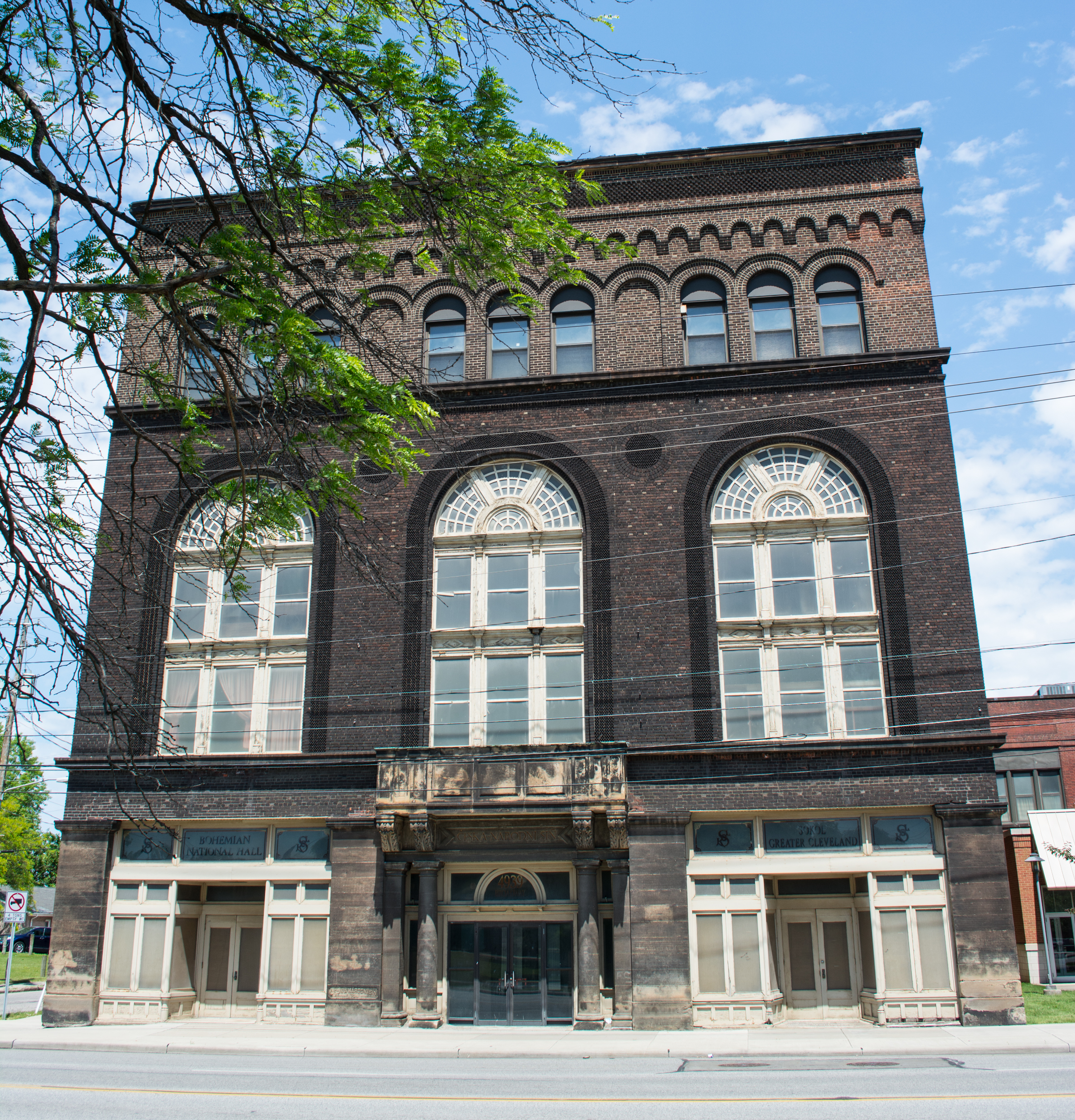
- Front facade of the Bohemian National Hall

- Location within Cleveland Location within Ohio Location within the United States
- Location: 4939 Broadway Avenue, Cleveland, Ohio 44127
- Coordinates: 41°28′20″N 81°39′23″W
- Built: 1896
- Architectural style: Romanesque
- NRHP reference No.: 75001359
- Added to NRHP: May 28, 1975

Bohemian National Hall (Czech: Česká národní síň) is an historic building located in the Broadway–Slavic Village neighborhood of Cleveland, Ohio. It was listed on the National Register of Historic Places in May 1975. The hall was built to serve the cultural and educational needs of the city's Czech community, and currently serves as host to Sokol Greater Cleveland and the Cleveland Czech Cultural Center and Museum.

== History ==
Bohemian National Hall was built in 1896-97 by Czech immigrants in Cleveland, reportedly becoming the "first hall in the city owned by a nationality group." The idea of the hall emerged in the 1880s in the Lodge Bratri v Kruhu of the Czech Slovak Benevolent Association. The fundraising effort was led by Czech American journalist Václav Šnajdr, and the building was designed by Andrew Mitermiler, John Hradek, and the Cleveland architectural firm of Steffens, Searles and Hirsh.

On October 22 and 23, 1915, Bohemian National Hall was the site of the signing of the Cleveland Agreement by Czech American and Slovak American representatives. The agreement was a precursor to the Pittsburgh Agreement, calling for the formation of a joint Czech and Slovak state, which was realized with the founding of Czechoslovakia in 1918.

Over the years, the building's exterior darkened appreciably due to the pollution from nearby steel mills. Sokol, a local Czech American society which promotes athletics and healthy living, purchased the building for $35,000 ($200,000 in 2025 dollars) in 1975.

Bohemian National Hall underwent a $400,000 ($800,000 in 2025 dollars) renovation in 1997. The basement was deepened by 2 feet (0.61 m) to raise the ceiling to a more customary height. In the first floor lobby, paint was stripped from the quarter-sawn oak molding and panelling and a false wall removed to reveal a wrought iron screen. The walls of the grand ballroom on the second floor were cleaned of more than a century of grime, and two ornate hand-carved columns were rescued and placed in the third-floor museum. An elevator was also added to the structure, to make the fourth floor gymnasium more accessible.

In 1998, Sokol began construction on a $1.5 million ($3,000,000 in 2025 dollars), 12,000-square-foot (1,100 m^{2}) addition to the Bohemian National Hall. Built by Panzica Construction, the volleyball court (which shared the ballroom) and the gymnastics practice area (on the fourth floor) moved to the addition once it was finished.

== See also ==
- Broadway Avenue Historic District (Cleveland)
