= Cleveland Agreement =

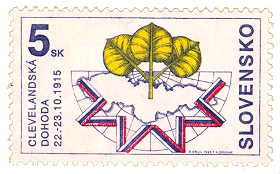
A 1995 Slovak stamp marking the 80th anniversary of the Cleveland Agreement

The Cleveland Agreement (Czech: Clevelandská dohoda; Slovak: Clevelandská dohoda) was an agreement signed by representatives of the Czech and Slovak people on 22 October 1915, at the Bohemian National Hall in Cleveland, Ohio. Its purpose was to show commitment to the fight for the self-determination of both Slavic nations in an independent federation, envisioned by Tomáš Masaryk, the founding father of Czechoslovakia.

== History ==
After several months of negotiations, the Cleveland Agreement was signed on 22 and 23 October 1915, in Cleveland's Bohemian National Hall, 4939 Broadway Ave. Signatories included representatives of the Slovak League, Ivan Daxner and Albert Pavol Mamatey, and the Czech National Association, Ludvík Fisher and Josef Tvrzický-Kramer. Mamatey was elected as Chairman, Emanuel Voska as Vice-Chairman, Štefan Osuský as Slovak Secretary, and J. Martínek as a Czech one. The agreement was about the conditions of Czech and Slovak cooperation and declared a common program with five points. Representatives of Slovaks participated on the condition that the future state will be a federation. In May 1918, it was replaced by the Pittsburgh Agreement.

== Agreement ==
The terms of the agreement were as follows:

1. Independence of Czech and Slovak lands.
2. Unification of Czech and Slovak Nations in federal union with national autonomy of Slovak people, with independent legislative, administration, cultural freedom including use of Slovak language, financial and political autonomy.
3. Free elections
4. Democratic government
5. This agreement can be amended only with the consent of both parties.

== See also ==
- Origins of Czechoslovakia
