= Hruby Conservatory of Music =

- U.S. National Register of Historic Places
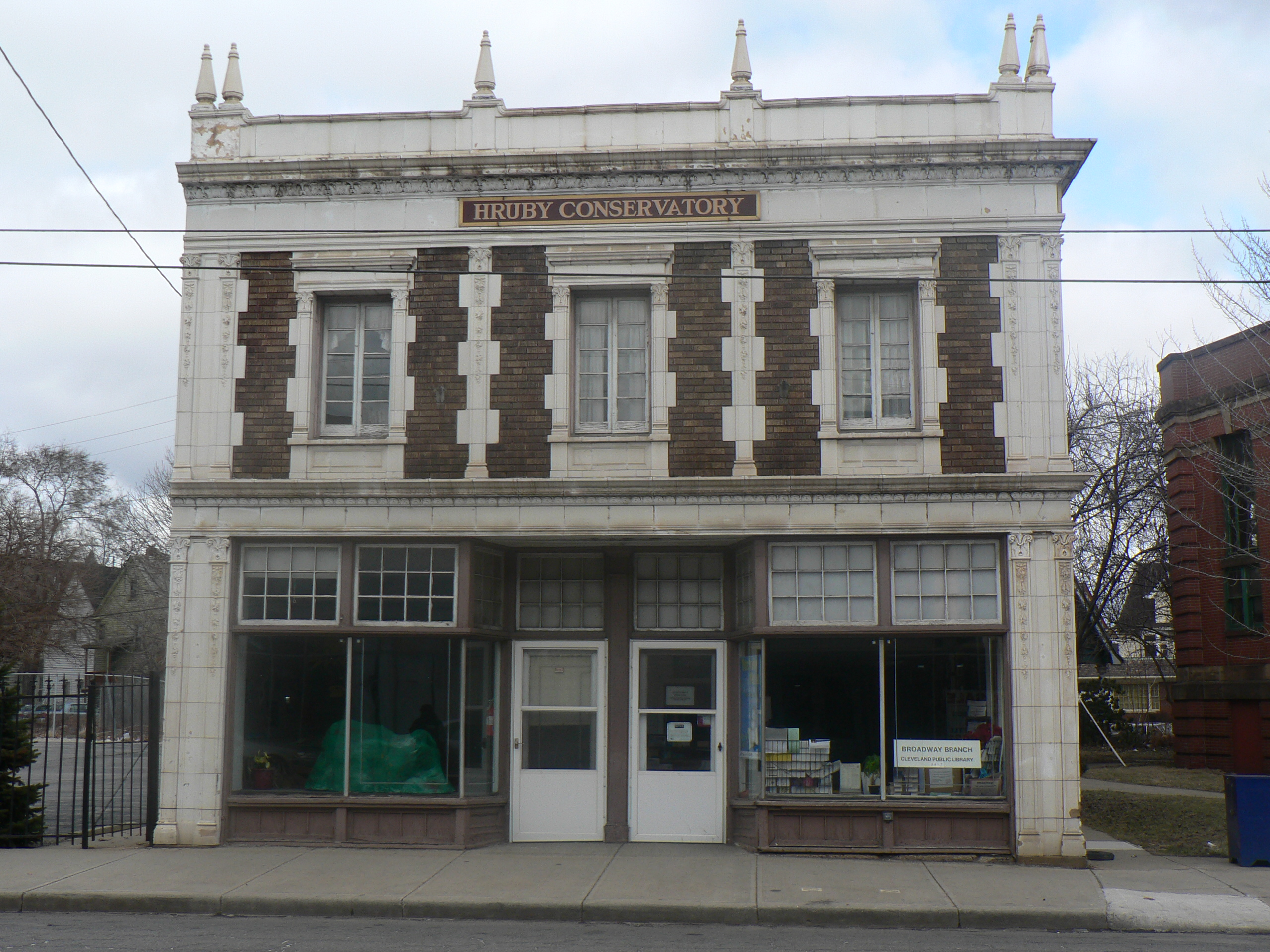
- Hruby Conservatory of Music

- Location within Ohio
- Location: 5415 Broadway Ave; Cleveland, Ohio
- Coordinates: 41°28′5″N 81°39′7.5″W
- Built: 1917
- Architect: Steffens & Steffens
- Architectural style: Late 19th And 20th Century Revivals, Renaissance Revival
- NRHP reference No.: 79001807
- Added to NRHP: November 29, 1979

The Hruby Conservatory of Music is a historic building completed in 1917 and located on Broadway Avenue in the Slavic Village area of Cleveland, Ohio. It was designed by the architectural firm of Steffens & Steffens as a music school for Frank and Fred Hruby, of the locally renowned musical Hruby Family. The style is considered Late 19th and 20th century Renaissance Revival.

The two-story building housed the music school on the second floor. It had several studios for lessons and a formal concert recital hall. The first level was designed for retail stores. The school closed in 1968 after Frank and Fred retired from teaching.

In 1976 the building was purchased by Dr. Nicholas Demmy and his wife Olean Demmy. The Demmys had the building restored and arranged for the facility to become the Broadway Branch of the Cleveland Music School Settlement. The school re-opened on October 2, 1980. In 1983 the school began operating as an independent non-profit called The Broadway School of Music and the Arts. Today the school continues to operate, however the building is owned by a private individual. The Hruby Conservatory of Music was added to the National Register of Historic Places on November 29, 1979.
