= Štefan Osuský =

Austro-Hungarian born Slovak lawyer, diplomat, politician and university professor

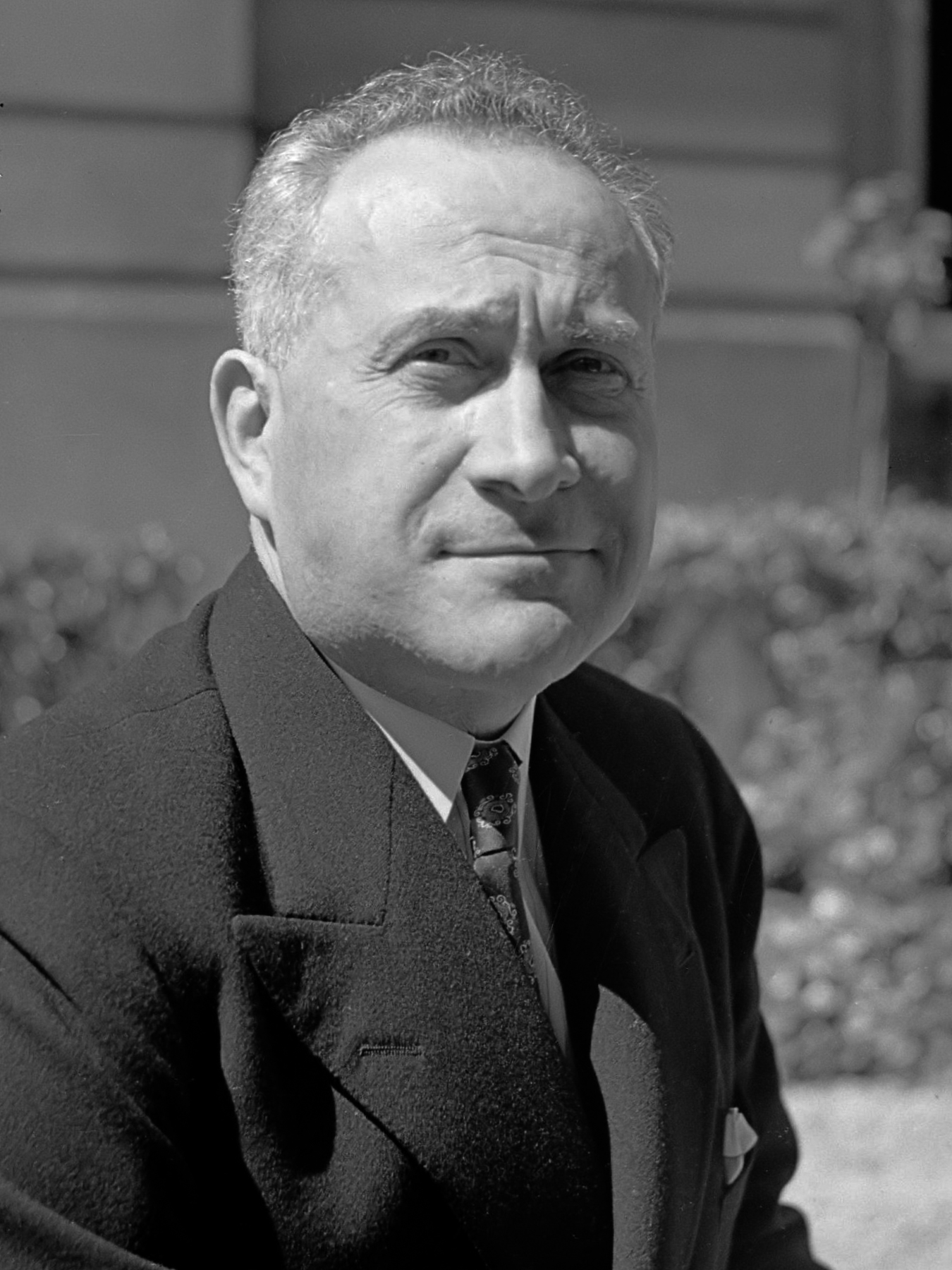
- Stefan Osusky (1939)
- Born: 31 March 1889; Brezova, Nyitra County, Austro-Hungarian Monarchy (present-day Slovakia)
- Died: 27 September 1973 (aged 84); Herndon, Virginia, U.S.
- Resting place: Oak Hill Cemetery; Washington, D.C., U.S.
- Other names: Stephen Osusky, Stefan Osusky, Štěpán Osuský
- Occupations: politician, diplomat
- Known for: co-founder of League of Nations, the predecessor of UN and representing newly established Czechoslovakia at post WW I conference in Trianon

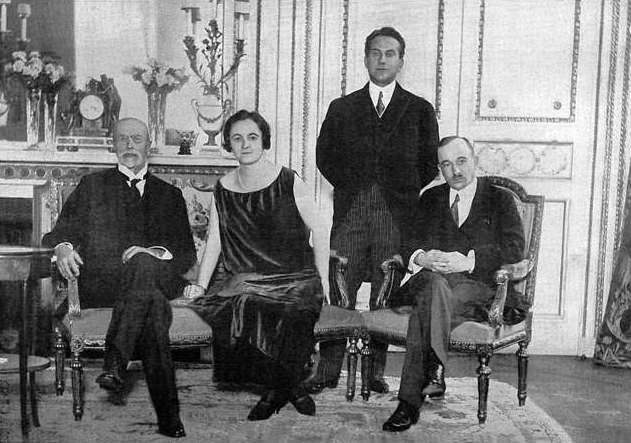
Tomáš Garrigue Masaryk visiting Paris in 1923, accompanied by Edvard Beneš, Ambassador Štefan Osuský a Mrs Osuská

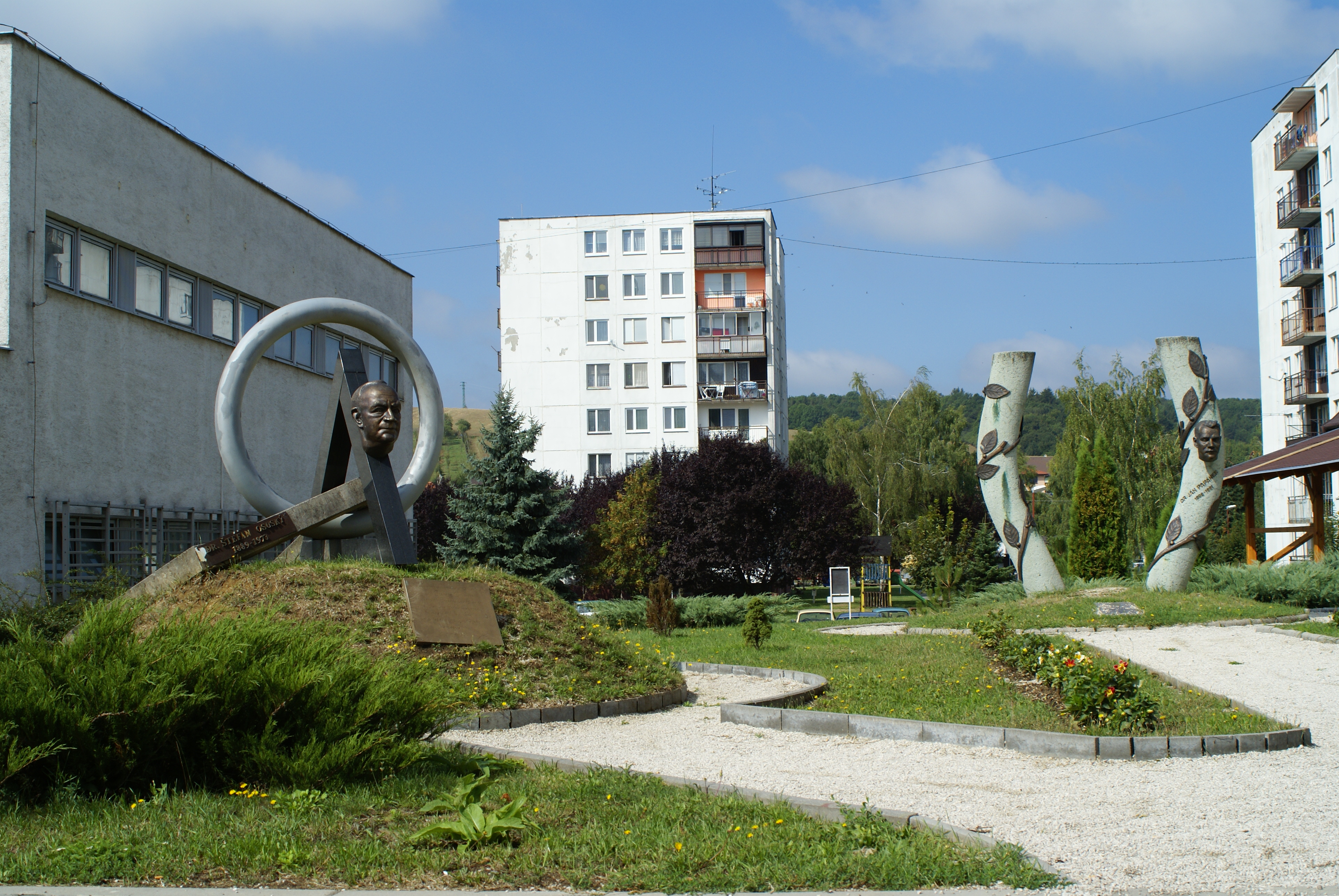
The Štefan Osuský Monument (left) in Brezová pod Bradlom

Štefan Osuský (31 March 1889 – 27 September 1973) was an Austro-Hungarian born Slovak lawyer, diplomat, politician and university professor.

== Biography ==
Osuský was born in March 1889 in the village Brezova, in the Nyitra County of the Austro-Hungary (present-day Slovakia). In 1902 he began his studies at the Lutheran Lyceum in Pressburg Bratislava. However, according to his own interpretation, in 1905 he was expelled from school because of his Slovak patriotic feelings and banned from all schools in the territory of the Dual Monarchy Austria-Hungary on a direct order of count Apponyi, Minister of Religion and Education of Hungary. Count Apponyi asked Osuský if he was going to be a "good Hungarian"; Osuský's silence on the question was taken by Apponyi as an offence. Osuský recalls the incident in his biography:

In spring of 1905 the minister of education, Count Apponyi, came to the lyceum to pay an inspection visit. He came to our class when we had Latin. Latin was my favorite subject and I was very good in it. ... After the exam Count Apponyi called me and asked me in Hungarian, "What is your name, young lad?" I answered, "My name is Osuský." "Where are you from?" "From Brezová." He replied: "Brezová, isn't it the nest that breeds all the revolts against Hungarians? You, however, are going to be a good Hungarian!" He didn't ask me whether I'd be a good Hungarian citizen, but simply if I'd be a good Hungarian. I remembered the words of my father's not to mix into politics. ... I paused a little to think about the best answer. Obviously, I could not agree to be a good Hungarian, I could not even force myself to say anything like that, so I remained silent.

However, Apponyi became government minister only in April 1906, when Osuský already left Bremen for New York City. Slovak historian Roman Holec considers this story as one of the few "Trianon hoaxes". On the other hand, Holec views Osuský's memory of meeting Apponyi in the US as much more truthful. When in February 1910 protesting American Slovaks disrupted Apponyi's speech in Chicago, the count with distaste replied that he "has nothing to say to people such as [Osuský]". Holec considers this incident to have left a strong impression on Osuský.

In Springfield and Chicago Osuský pursued his studies of theology, natural sciences and law, receiving a JD degree in 1916. Immediately after his arrival in the United States he began working actively in expatriate organizations, at first in the Czech National Association, later in the Slovak League in the US. In 1915 he established the newspapers Slovenské slovo ("Slovak Word") and Slovenský týždenník ("Slovak Weekly"). In 1916 Osuský became the vice-president of the Slovak League, which in turn sent him to Europe to negotiate cooperation with Czecho-Slovak foreign resistance. His task was to ensure the acceptance of the Cleveland Agreement principles.

In Paris he started to cooperate with the Czechoslovak National Council, whose objective was the dissolution of Austria-Hungary and the creation of a new state for Czechs and Slovaks. Between 1917 and 1918 Osuský worked as the director of a Czecho-Slovak press agency in Geneva. Between 8–10 April 1918 in Rome he was a representative, together with Milan Rastislav Štefánik, of Slovaks at the Congress of Oppressed Nations. In 1918 he helped organize the Czechoslovak Legions in Italy, established in spite of international treaties prohibiting the creation of military units out of captured enemies.

After the creation of Czechoslovakia he began working in the diplomatic services of the new republic. From October 1918 he held the post of the country's diplomatic representative in the United Kingdom. As secretary general of a Czechoslovak delegation in 1919-1920 he participated in the Paris Peace Conference. On 4 June 1920 in Grand Trianon as the extraordinary and plenipotentiary envoy of Czechoslovakia he signed the Treaty of Trianon with Hungary. He later recalled: "I will never forget about one thing. When I was signing my name underneath the treaty carrying the name Trianon, at quarter to five in June 1920, I was fully aware, that I was signing for the final account of the Slovak nation to Kingdom of Hungary, accounting for the costs signed top down by blood, suffering and poverty of my nation. And this statement of account is eternal."

He significantly contributed to the functioning of the newly formed League of Nations; between 1921 and 1932 he worked with the Reparations Commission, representing not only Czechoslovakia but also Poland, Yugoslavia, Romania and Greece. From 1922 he was the chairman of the Supervisory Commission - a function he held for fourteen years. He was also active in the Delimitation Commission, tasked with setting new borders in Europe.

From 1921 Osuský worked as the Czechoslovak ambassador in France, contributing significantly to the development of Czechoslovak-French relations, a cornerstone of ČSR's international security. He remained at this post until the Second World War. After the breakup of Czechoslovakia in March 1939, he refused to relinquish the embassy and kept the office functioning. He began to organize Czechoslovak foreign resistance. 2 October 1939 Osuský signed an Agreement on the Reestablishment of the Czechoslovak Army in France with French Prime Minister Édouard Daladier. His activity, however, met with resistance, especially with Eduard Beneš. Although in November 1939 he became a member of the Czechoslovak National Committee founded by Beneš, and in July 1940 Osuský was designated a minister of the Czechoslovak government in exile in London, his relations with Beneš were deteriorating. The differences with Beneš lay especially in the areas of foreign policy, the organization of Czechoslovak foreign resistance, the post-war restructuring of the republic and the solution of the Slovak issue. In March 1942 Beneš removed him from all functions and Osuský retired from the active scene.

He began lecturing on the history of diplomacy and international relations at Oxford. In the spring of 1945 Osuský left for the United States, becoming a professor at the Colgate University in Hamilton, New York. After the Communist takeover in February 1948 he was active in the Council of Free Czechoslovakia. He also worked as a journalist-political scientist. In his work he especially paid attention to the history and presence of Czechoslovak politics in international relations. He died in Herndon, Virginia, on 27 September 1973.

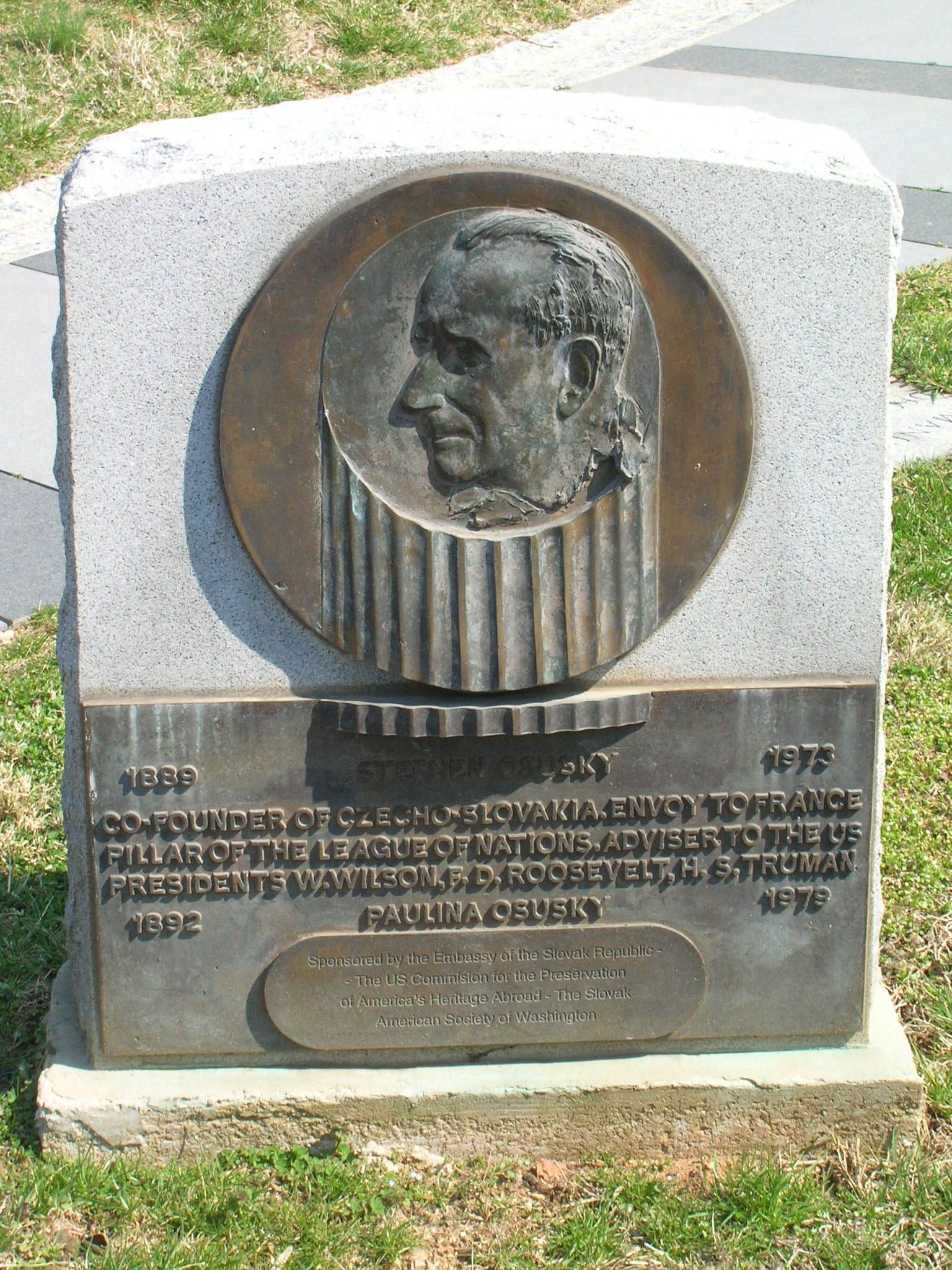
Grave of Osuský at Oak Hill Cemetery

He is buried at Oak Hill Cemetery, Georgetown, Washington, D.C. The epitaph on his grave, quoting Psalm 1:3, reads: "And he shall be like a tree planted by the rivers of water, that bringeth forth his fruit in his season; his leaf also shall not wither."

In 1992 the post-Communist Czechoslovak government posthumously awarded him the Order of T. G. Masaryk I-class. In 2001 Osuský received the Order of the White Double Cross II-class in memoriam.
