= Broadway (Cleveland) =

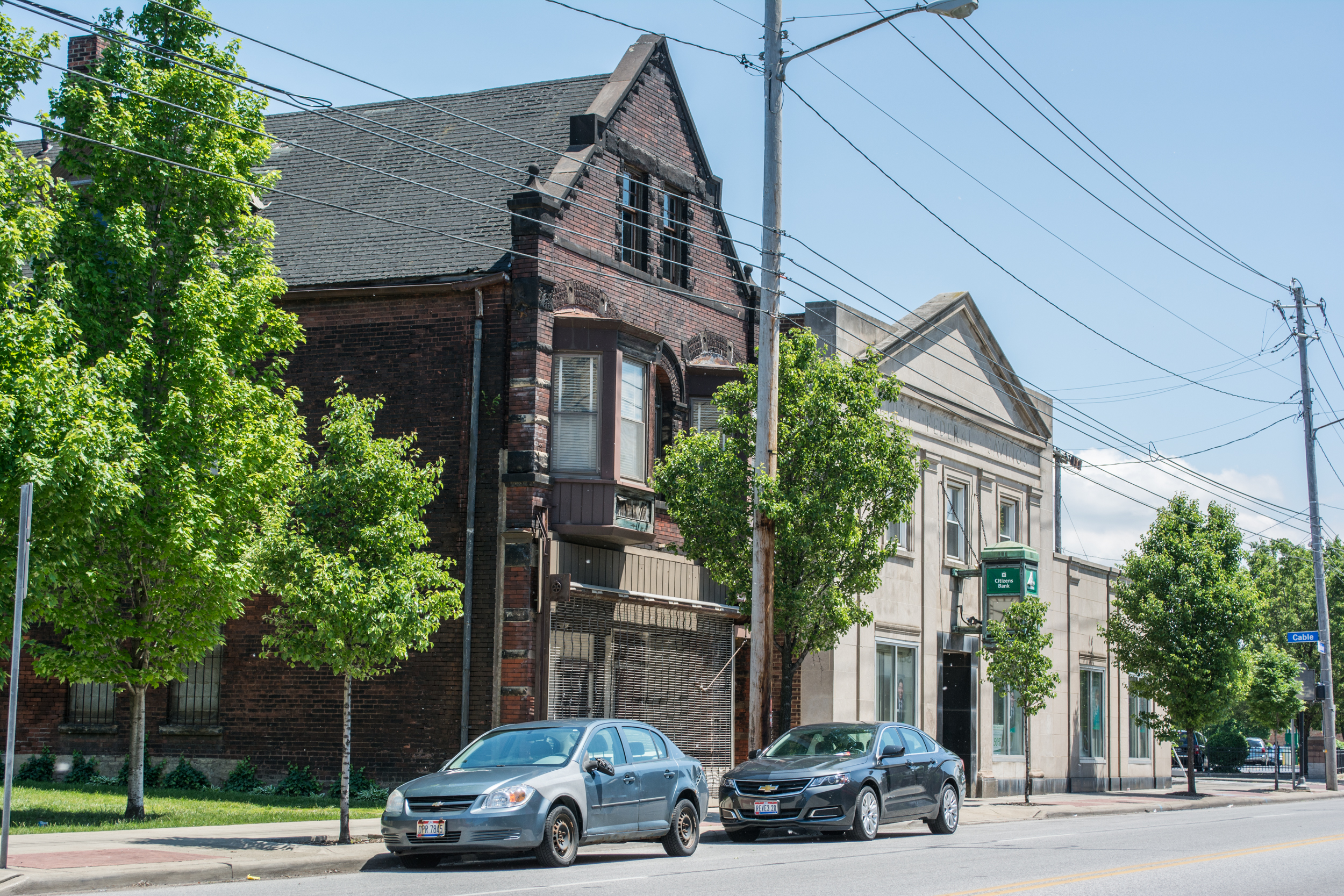
- North end: Carnegie Avenue / Ontario Street, in Downtown Cleveland
- Major junctions: SR 10 in Downtown Cleveland I-90 / I-77 in Downtown Cleveland; I-490 in Cleveland; SR 43 in Cleveland; I-480 in Garfield Heights; SR 17 in Maple Heights; SR 8 in Bedford I-271 / I-480 in Oakwood
- South end: Richmond Road / Ravenna Road in Oakwood

Broadway Avenue is a road in Cuyahoga County in the U.S. state of Ohio. Broadway begins in Downtown Cleveland at Carnegie Avenue as a continuation to the south of Ontario Street. It runs from northwest to southeast through the cities of Cleveland, Garfield Heights, Maple Heights, Bedford, and the village of Oakwood. Its southern terminus is at the southern boundary of Cuyahoga County where it intersects Richmond Road and continues to the southeast into Summit County as Ravenna Road.

Broadway is concurrent with State Route 14 throughout its most of its length, and is also concurrent in parts with State Route 43, U.S. Route 422, State Route 8, and State Route 87. It also used to carry a section of U.S. Route 21.

== See also ==
- Ohio State Route 14
- South Broadway, Cleveland
