= Pittsburgh Agreement =

Agreement to create Czechoslovakia

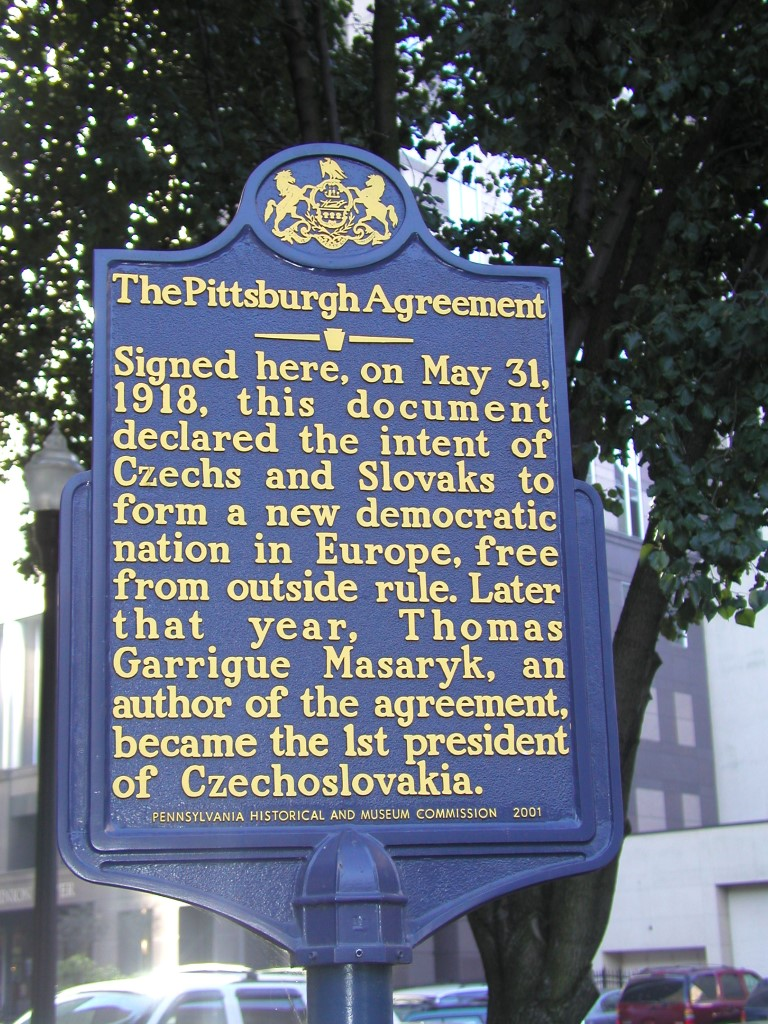
Plaque commemorating the Pittsburgh Agreement

The Pittsburgh Agreement was a memorandum of understanding completed on 31 May 1918, between members of Czech and Slovak expatriate communities in the United States. It replaced the Cleveland Agreement of 22 October 1915. It is named for the city of Pittsburgh, Pennsylvania, where the agreement was made.

The agreement prescribed the intent of the cosignatories to create an independent Czechoslovakia. This was achieved on 18 October 1918, when the primary author of the agreement, Tomáš Garrigue Masaryk, declared the independence of Czechoslovakia. Masaryk was elected the first president of Czechoslovakia in November 1918.

== Background ==
The historical setting of the Pittsburgh Agreement was the impending dissolution of the Austro-Hungarian Empire in the months before the end of World War I. By September 1918, it was evident that the forces of the Habsburg monarchy, the rulers of Austria-Hungary, would be defeated by the Allies: Britain, France, and Russia. Between 1860 and 1918, close to one million people of Slovak and Czech ethnicity migrated to the United States and other nations. At the time, these immigrants were officially recorded as Austrians or Hungarians (Magyars), which did not reflect their actual ethnic origin. However, the United States allowed Czech and Slovak nationalist groups to form and operate. On 22 October 1915, at the Bohemian National Hall on Broadway, Cleveland, Ohio the Slovak League of America and the Bohemian (Czech) National Alliance signed the Cleveland Agreement. With this, the two groups agreed to work together towards a united and independent state for Czechs and Slovaks. Joining the Czech and the Slovak population groups helped the Slovaks break away from the Hungarian state of the Austro-Hungarian Empire, and created a state with a clear Slavic majority to overcome the large German-speaking population of Bohemia.

== Meeting ==
On Friday, 31 May 1918, a meeting of the Czecho-Slovak National Council under the presidency of Tomáš Garrigue Masaryk was called into order at the Loyal Order of Moose Building, 628-634 Penn Avenue, Pittsburgh, Pennsylvania.

Present were representatives of fraternal organizations including the Slovak League of America; the Czech National Federation; the First Slovak Evangelical League and the Association of Czech Catholics. These associations represented immigrants to America from Bohemia, Moravia, Slovakia, and Czech Silesia. (Thursday, 30 May 1918, the Memorial Day public holiday saw many Czech and Slovak residents of Pittsburgh come downtown to fete Masaryk's arrival).

The signed document bring data 30 May 1918.

== Agreement ==
An agreement was drafted which read:

"1. We approve (sanction) the political program, which endeavors to bring about a Union of the Czechs and Slovaks in an independent state comprising the Czech Lands (the lands of the Bohemian Crown) and Slovakia.

2. Slovakia will have its own administration, its Diet and its courts.

3. The Slovak language will be the official language in schools and in public life in general (in Slovakia).

4. The Czecho-Slovak state will be a republic, its Constitution will be democratic.

5. The organization of the collaboration of the Czechs and the Slovaks in the United States will be amplified and adjusted according to the needs and according to the changing situation, by mutual agreement.

6. Detailed rules concerning the organization of the Czecho-Slovak State are left to the liberated Czechs and Slovaks and their legal representatives (to establish)."

== Signatories ==
=== Slovak ===
==== Ivan Bielek (1886–1941) ====
Bielek, born in Slovakia, was vice president and director of the Czecho Slovak Commercial Corp. of America, an import company founded in 1918.

==== Michal Bosák (1869–1937) ====
Bosák, born in Okruhle, Slovakia, was a banker and shipping agent who, during World War I, raised funds for the campaign for an independent Slovak nation.

==== Ivan Daxner (1860–1938) ====
Daxner was born in Nagykálló, the son of political activist, Štefan Marko Daxner. He became a banker and continued this profession upon emigrating to the United States. He became the executive secretary of the Slovak League of America. He said:

"Away from the Magyars, but not into Czech subservience; we want to join Czechs as equals."

==== Ján Adolf Ferienčík (1863–1925) ====
Ferienčík was the editor of Slovenský hlásnik (Slovak Herald), the weekly publication of the Slavonic Evangelical Union of America.

==== Ignác Gessay (1874–1928) ====
Gessay, born in the Orava region, Slovakia, to a peasant family, became a school teacher before emigrating to the United States. In the United States, he worked as a journalist with Ján Pankúch.

==== Milan Alexander Getting (1878–1951) ====
Milan Getting was a Slovak journalist and politician and later a diplomat. He emigrated to the United States in 1902. He was a publisher of the newspaper of the Slovak Sokol.

==== Jozef Hušek (1880–1947) ====
Husek, a Catholic, was born in Okolicne, Slovakia. He emigrated to the USA in 1903 and worked in journalism and the Slovak League of America.

==== Ján Janček Jr. (1881–1933) ====
Janček, born in Ruzomberok, Slovakia, was a writer, news editor, and later, a politician and the mayor of Ruzomberok.

==== Ján Kubašek (1885–1950) ====
Rev. Kubašek emigrated from Slovakia to Yonkers, the United States, in 1902 and was ordained in 1914. He became president of the Association of Slovak Catholics.

==== Albert Mamatey (1870–1923) ====
Mamatey, born in Kláštor pod Znievom, Slovakia, was the president of the National Slovak Society and the Slovak League of America. He advocated the preservation of Slovak culture while also assisting Slovak immigrants to be well-regarded in their new land.

==== Jozef Murgaš (1864–1929) ====
Rev. Jozef Murgaš was a Roman Catholic priest born in Tajov, Slovakia. In 1896, he emigrated to the United States to a Slovak parish in Wilkes-Barre, Pennsylvania. He was a founding member of the Slovak League of America.

==== Ján Pankúch (1869–1951) ====
Pankúch emigrated to the United States from Slovakia in 1885 and worked for the Slovak League of America. He was a journalist in Cleveland, Ohio.

==== Andrej Schustek ====
Schustek was chairman of the first district of the Slovak League of America. In Chicago, on the second anniversary of the independence of Czechoslovakia:

"He assured us, the Bohemians, that every Slovak is a sincere brother of ours, a son of one mother - Slovakia. He referred to the frequently overlooked fact that until recently, the Slovaks did not have their own Slovak schools, that ever since childhood, they were brought up to hate Bohemians and everything Slavic. Therefore, it is not surprising that many of them are still against us today, especially when they are continually instigated by hired or voluntary agents."

==== Pavel Šiška ====
Rev. Šiška was the financial secretary of the Slovak League of America.

=== Czech ===
==== Vojta Beneš (1878–1951) ====
Vojta Beneš was born in Kožlany as the brother of Edvard Beneš. Vojta Beneš was an organizer of the Bohemian National Alliance of America. In 1917, he published How Bohemians Organised, reflecting the nationalist movement.

==== Hynek Dostál (1871–1943) ====
Dostál was the editor of the Hlas newspaper of St. Louis and the editor of the journal of the Saint John Nepomuk Chapel, the first Czech Catholic newspaper in the United States.

==== Ludvík Fisher (1880–1945) ====
Fisher was president of the Czech National Alliance.

==== Innocent Kestl ====
Rev. Kestl was a Czech Catholic priest who became the vice president of the Czechoslovak National Council.

==== Josef Martínek (1889–1980) ====
Martinek, born in Poděbrady (nowadays Palackého Street 130), a small town east of Prague, emigrated to Cleveland, Ohio, as a metal worker. He became a newspaper editor, socialist, and Czech nationalist.

==== Tomáš Garrigue Masaryk (1850–1937) ====
Tomáš Garrigue Masaryk was a member of the Austrian government and a philosopher at the University of Prague. He was key in securing the Czech people's independence and became Czechoslovakia's president.

==== Karel Pergler (1882–1954) ====
Karel Pergler, born in Liblin, Bohemia, emigrated to the United States in childhood. He became a lawyer and a journalist. Pergler was head of the Slav Press Bureau, founded in May 1918, and a member of the Bohemian National Alliance and the Bohemian Chapter of the Socialist Party of America. He later became the Czechoslovak ambassador to the United States.

==== Bohumik Shimek ====
Bohumil Shimek was a Czech-American botanist who was active in the campaign for Czechoslovak independence in the United States.

==== Oldřich Zlámal (1879–1955) ====
Rev. Zlámal was born in Korkory, Moravia. He was ordained in the Catholic Church in Cleveland, Ohio in 1904.

==== Jaroslav Joseph Zmrhal (1878–1951) ====
Zmrhal was a principal and superintendent in the Chicago Public Schools system.

== Outcome ==
On 18 October 1918, a Czech provisional government in Paris announced the Czechoslovak Declaration of Independence.

== Archive ==
A calligraphic lithograph of the agreement was signed after the meeting. On 9 September 2007, the item was donated to the Heinz History Center in Pittsburgh. Other copies are archived elsewhere worldwide.
