= Slavic Village Development =

Non-profit community development corporation in Cleveland, Ohio, U.S.

- Location: Cleveland, Ohio

Slavic Village Development (SVD) is a non-profit community development corporation serving the North and South Broadway neighborhoods of Cleveland, Ohio. Over a period of 22 years, SVD has invested $160 million in these neighborhoods through various housing projects.

== Mission statement ==
"Our mission is to preserve, empower, and advance Slavic Village as a thriving diverse neighborhood. Essential to our neighborhood is its unique identity with quality housing anchored by excellent recreational, educational, cultural, religious, and institutional anchors supported by a retail, commercial, and industrial base."

== History ==
Slavic Village Development (SVD) is a non-profit community development corporation with over 25 years experience in neighborhood development and community building in Broadway Slavic Village, a community of 30,000 people in southeast Cleveland. Historically an ethnic blue collar community, Broadway Slavic Village has faced challenges in recent years from job loss and aging housing; the community is evolving into a diverse, affordable place for people of modest means to raise their families.

== Projects, past and present ==
Slavic Village Development has a long history of physical development and community building, with particular emphasis on complex real estate site assembly. SVD has rehabbed or built over 1,000 housing units, including a 200+ home planned community, several large multi-family buildings, and over 400 homes for low-income families.

In recent years, SVD has refined its programming and has increasingly used community organizing and community building activities to address quality of life issues, such as activities for youth, safety, and recreation. Arts programming, including public art, concerts, festivals and parades have become more important as has the development of parks, green space and recreational amenities, SVD has been instrumental in the creation of several new parks, and in 2006 opened Morgana Run Bike Trail, a 3-mile trail developed on an abandoned rail line. SVD leveraged the development of the trail and created a new park and history center capitalizing on the Mill Creek waterfall, and linked the Morgana Trail to the Ohio Erie Canal Towpath, an extensive trail system just south of the neighborhood.

== Foreclosure crisis ==
=== An overview of the history of the crisis in Slavic Village ===
Cleveland was hit earlier and harder by the foreclosure crisis than almost any other city in the United States. In 2007, one of the zip codes representing Slavic Village (44105) was named the "hardest hit" zip code in the United States. According to Claudia Coulton, co-director of the Center on Urban Poverty and Community Development at Case Western Reserve University, part of the reason for the focus of foreclosures in the Slavic Village area is that the neighborhood was becoming revitalized. Housing prices were increasing gradually, along with its steadily improving reputation. These factors combined with a lot of first-time homeowners to create an environment conducive to predatory lenders. Fraudulent home sales started to increase in volume in the Slavic Village neighborhood in 1999. Investors would buy a distressed property, perhaps make a few cosmetic repairs, and then resell the property for up to two or three times its actual value. This practice helped contribute to an increase in home prices, which then attracted predatory lenders.

Poor housing quality from fraudulently appraised, unrehabbed homes, which often have been sold for inflated prices two or three times, has added to the devastation of the foreclosure crisis. When an owner is facing foreclosure on a property they bought for tens of thousands of dollars more than its actual value, they usually never make any of the necessary repairs and instead abandon the property. Instead of homes in good repair sitting empty for years (as is the case in other hard-hit states like California and Florida), homes that are in desperate need of repairs sit for years rotting away. As these homes decay, they are broken into, vandalized, and stripped of any piping or wiring of value. This leads to the home becoming a haven for squatters, juveniles, drugs, and arson.

=== Response to the foreclosure crisis ===
According to executive director of Slavic Village Development Marie Kittredge, at first Slavic Village had to battle predatory lending with local help only. She wrote in a May 2009 editorial,

"Cleveland officials began fighting predatory lending in 1999. At the state and national levels, there was no interest in addressing the problem, so it continued to escalate until 2007, when we began implementing responses like decorating boarded-up houses to let people know we were here and fighting back. At the same time, we partnered with other community development corporations, Neighborhood Progress Inc. and state, local and national funders to craft a programmatic response: Opportunity Homes. This sophisticated program joins aggressive foreclosure-prevention strategies with targeted demolition of obsolete houses and full rehab of good-quality abandoned homes.

In our neighborhood, the rehabbed homes are frequently doubles, which we are converting to singles and packaging with adjacent vacant lots to create larger yards, thereby reducing density and meeting contemporary standards. The rehabbed homes are sold using attractive financing. For families with ruined credit, a lease option is provided while they repair their credit to qualify for a mortgage.

...Even before the ['Re-Imagining a More Sustainable Cleveland'] report, we have been "growing smaller, growing smarter" with real, measurable results in Broadway/Slavic Village. We consolidated commercial uses and expanded industrial uses with updated zoning. We built our bike trail on an abandoned rail line and demolished obsolete buildings on Broadway Avenue to create two new trailheads and our own Emerald Necklace. We have created new athletic fields to serve our two high schools, which previously had no outdoor athletic facilities. We are creating green-belt buffers, restoring native habitats and expanding community gardens. We are harnessing these strategies with targeted available resources and our active residents to transform neighborhoods, block by block."

==== Other SVD programs in response to the crisis ====
===== Mr. Blue project =====
The "Mr. Blue" project was an effort started by Slavic Village Development in 2006 to try to make abandoned homes seem more lived in, and to try to soften the desolate effect of many shuttered homes on one street. SVD works with block clubs and other community volunteer groups to paint boarded homes with cheerful images, such as pies cooling, sleeping cats, and flower vases resting on window sills. The project got its name from the signature blue person painted on all the boarded doors as if it is peeking out to wave at a visitor.
