= Broadway–Slavic Village =

Neighborhood of Cleveland, Ohio, United States

- Neighborhood of Cleveland

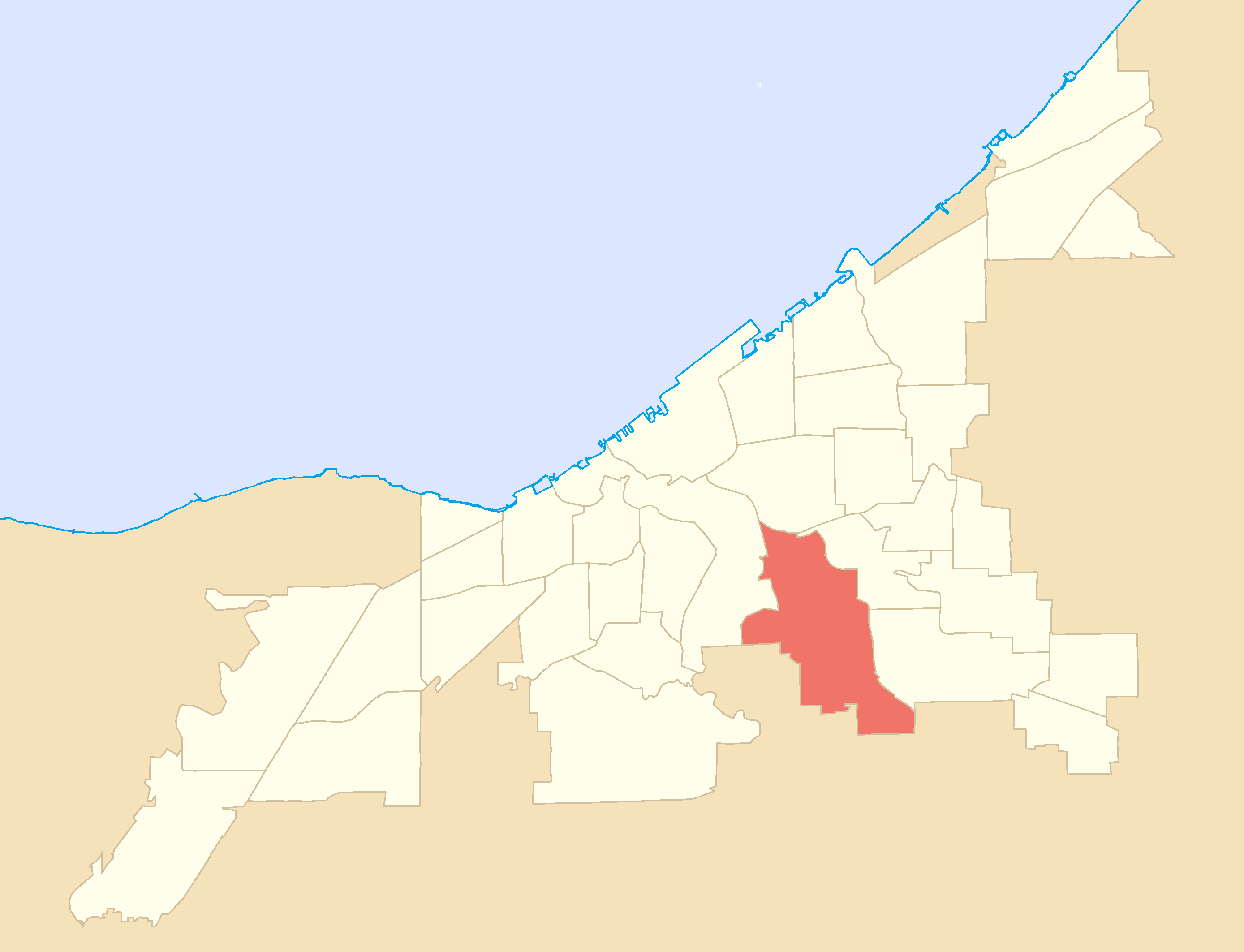

- Location within Cleveland Location within Ohio
- Coordinates: 41°27′29″N 81°38′41″W
- Country: United States
- State: Ohio
- County: Cuyahoga County
- City: Cleveland

Population (2020)
  - Total: 20,150

Demographics
  - White: 42%
  - Black: 49.9%
  - Hispanic (of any race): 8.1%
  - Asian and Pacific Islander: 0.4%
  - Mixed and Other: 7.7%
- Time zone: UTC-5 (EST)
  - Summer (DST): UTC-4 (EDT)
- ZIP Codes: 44105, 44127
- Area code: 216
- Median income: $26,407
- Warszawa Neighborhood District
- U.S. National Register of Historic Places
- U.S. Historic district
- Built: 1880
- Architectural style: Queen Anne
- NRHP reference No.: 80002980
- Added to NRHP: November 28, 1980
- Source: 2020 U.S. Census, City Planning Commission of Cleveland

Broadway–Slavic Village is a neighborhood on the Southeast side of Cleveland, Ohio. One of the city's oldest neighborhoods, it originated as the township of Newburgh, first settled in 1799. Much of the area has historically served as home to Cleveland's original Czech and Polish immigrants. While demographics have shifted over the decades, the largest part of Broadway today, Slavic Village, is named for these earlier communities.

Broadway is bordered to the west and northwest by Cuyahoga Valley, to the north by the Central neighborhood, to the east by the neighborhoods of Union–Miles Park and Kinsman, the suburbs of Cuyahoga Heights and Newburgh Heights to the west and southwest and Garfield Heights to the south.

== Slavic Village ==
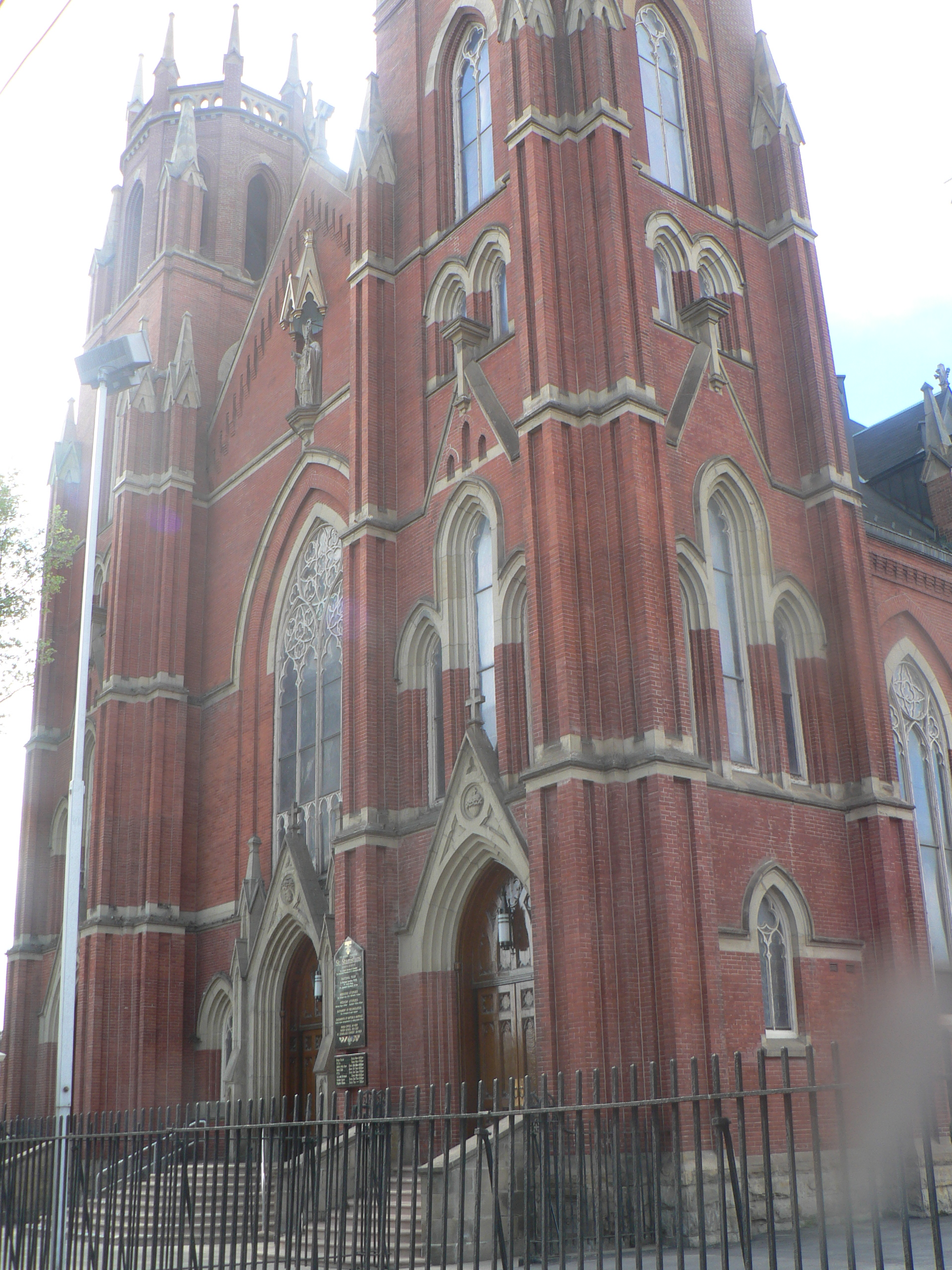
Shrine Church of St. Stanislaus

The historic Slavic Village is named for what was once a predominantly Central European neighborhood centered on Fleet Avenue and Broadway. The neighborhood's name encompasses two smaller ethnically sub-divided sections: the larger Czech-dominated Karlin, and the heavily Polish Warszawa districts.

Slavic Village is combining the Warszawa site the Polish immigrants settled in 1870. The lives of these immigrants were centered on the hamlets they've formed and the St. Stanislaus Church they built. Its exact location is at East 65th Street and Forman Avenue, and the thriving Polish commercial center along Fleet Avenue and East 71st Street. The population of Poles and other Central Europeans in the neighborhood peaked in the period from the 1920s to 1940 and began to decline during migration of the people to the villages, when the city suffered demographic decline during the 1950s and 1960s. On November 28, 1980, Warszawa was added to the National Register of Historic Places as Warszawa Neighborhood District.

An attempt to revitalize the neighborhood was undertaken with the organization of Neighborhood Ventures, Inc., in 1977. With Teddy and Donna Sliwinski, along with architect Kaszimier Wieclaw, the area began to come alive once again. In order to attract people of various Slavic European descent, the name of the region was changed to "Slavic Village".

The nonprofit Slavic Village Assn. was organized in 1978 to preserve residential and commercial buildings through its sponsorship of the annual Slavic Village Harvest Festival, which in its 17th year (1993) was drawing 100,000 people. Between 1987 and 1990, the Slavic Village Assn. merged with the Broadway Development Corporation as the Slavic Village Broadway Development Corporation to coordinate community-based revitalization activities in the Broadway neighborhood. The Slavic Village Broadway Development Corporation is now known as just Slavic Village Development, and cites an "investment of $160 million over the past 22 years to improve Slavic Village."

More recently, Slavic Village has seen difficult times. The zip code that includes the neighborhood, 44105, recorded more home foreclosures than any other zip code in the country during the second quarter of 2007, causing the national media to declare the neighborhood the center of the 2007 foreclosure crisis.

The neighborhood saw an increase in property crime, violent crime, and prostitution during 2007, attributed to youth gangs and drug dealers taking advantage of the high number of home foreclosures.

The City's plan to eliminate the 3rd police district, which includes Slavic Village, had been an issue of concern for some residents, as voiced by then-councilman Anthony Brancatelli. In May 2008, the former 3rd District Police headquarters closed and Slavic Village policing responsibility was redrawn between the 3rd and 5th Police Districts, increasing the number of police cars on the street. Subsequently, Councilman Brancatelli stated he was satisfied with the resulting improved police response time and police presence. In 2008, 14% of the Slavic Village houses were boarded up. The Slavic Village became a symbol of the Great Recession.

Slavic Village is served by the Fleet Branch of the Cleveland Public Library system.
