= Cleveland Short Line Railway =

Railway line in Ohio, United States

Overview
- Locale: within and south of Cleveland, Ohio, U.S.
- Dates of operation: 1910–1915
- Successor: New York Central Railroad

Technical
- Track gauge: 1,435 mm (4 ft 8 1/2 in) standard gauge
- Length: 22 miles (35 km)

Other
- Website: csx.com

The Cleveland Short Line Railway is a freight bypass around southern Cleveland, Ohio, in the United States. A quasi-independent railroad organized by major shareholders of the Lake Shore and Michigan Southern Railway, the shortline was intended to allow the Lake Shore and Michigan Southern to bypass the congested railroads in downtown Cleveland. The Cleveland Short Line has had a succession of owners, and is currently part of CSX Transportation.

== History ==
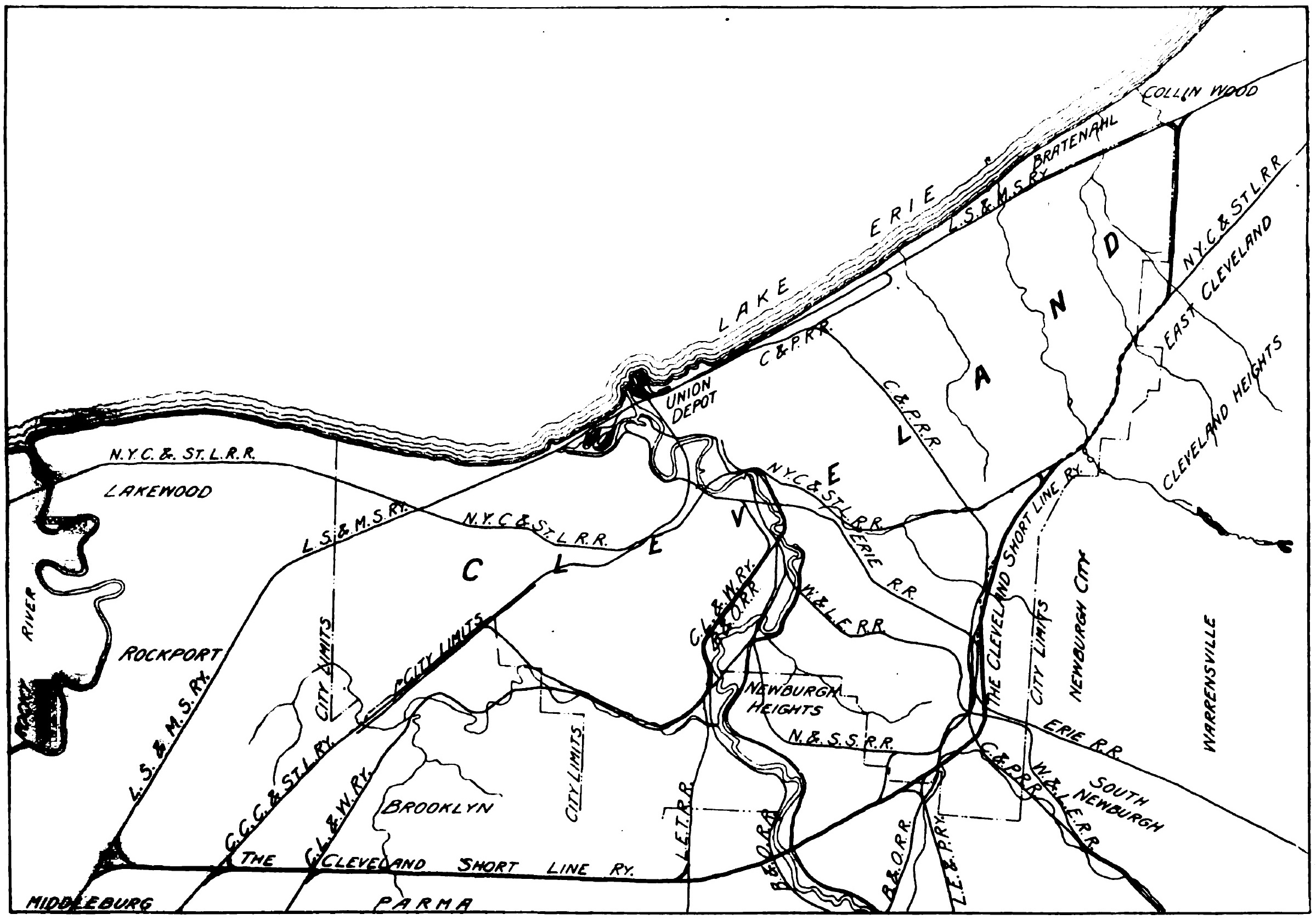
Map showing the route of the Cleveland Short Line and other area railroads in 1907.

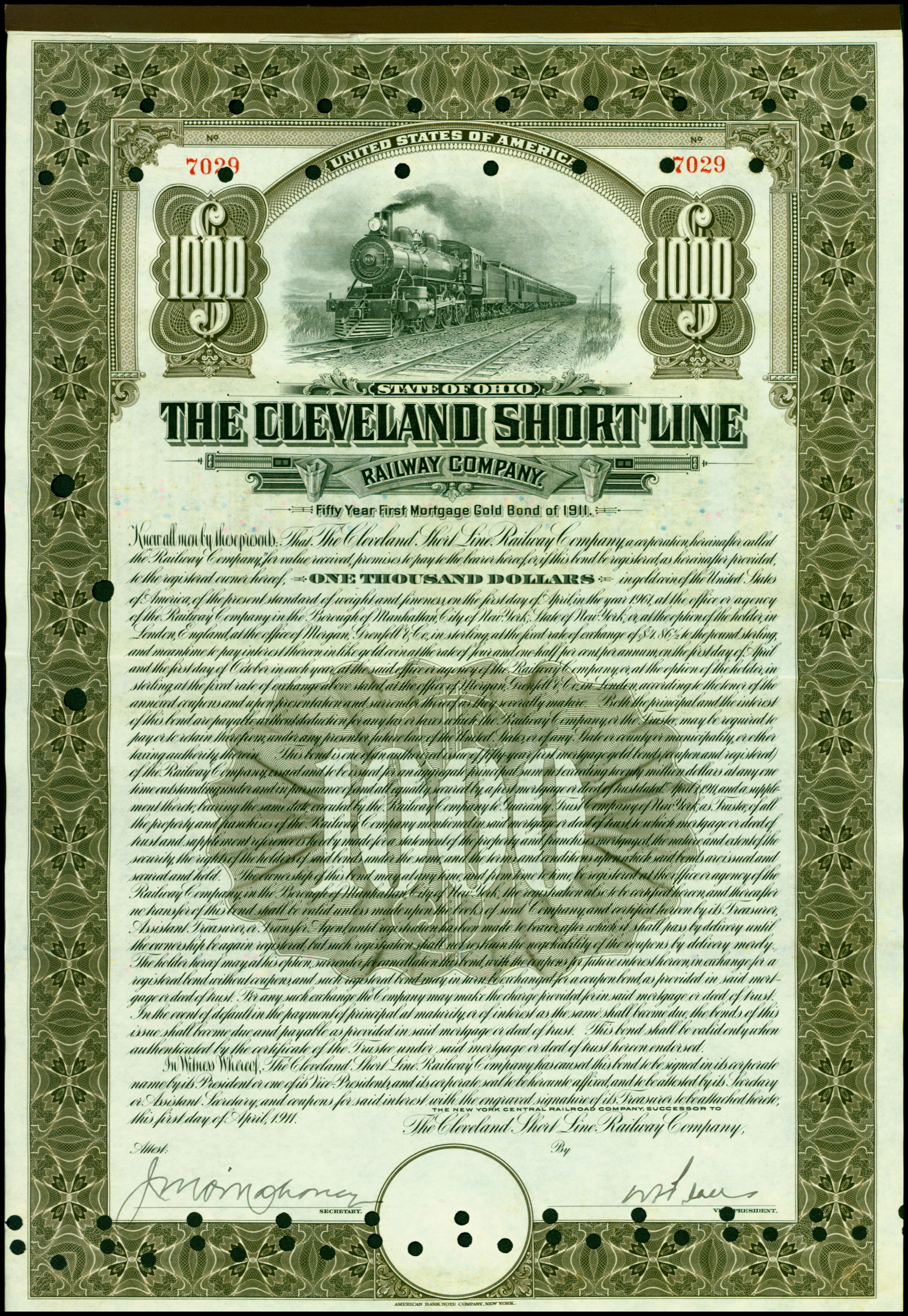
Gold bond of the Cleveland Short Line RW Company, issued 1. April 1911

=== Construction and merger with the Central ===
The Cleveland Short Line Railway was chartered November 24, 1902. The incorporators, who were major shareholders in the Lake Shore and Michigan Southern Railway (LS&MS), intended to construct a circumferential railroad from the LS&MS main line on the border between the Riverside and Bellaire-Puritas neighborhoods of Cleveland (an area known to railroads as "Rockport") to the LS&MS rail yard in Collinwood, Ohio.

Construction began in May 1906. The first 10.08-mile (16.22 km) section, from Rockport to the Lake Erie and Pittsburgh Railway (a block south of the intersection of Broadway and Harvard Avenues in the Slavic Village neighborhood, an area known to railroads as "Marcy") opened on February 24, 1910.

On April 1, 1911, the LS&MS entered into a 99-year lease of the Cleveland Short Line. The lease required the LS&MS to pay to the Cleveland Short Line each year an amount equal to 5 percent of its outstanding capital stock plus an amount equal to the interest on the Short Line's outstanding debt. The remaining 9.56 miles (15.39 km) of the line opened on July 1, 1912. By December 31, 1913, the LS&MS had purchased all the outstanding stock of the Cleveland Short Line.

The LS&MS merged with the New York Central Railroad (NYC) in December 1914, and the NYC absorbed the Cleveland Short Line in 1915.

=== Later history ===
The New York Central Railroad merged with the Pennsylvania Railroad on February 1, 1968, to create the Penn Central Transportation Company ("Penn Central"). The Penn Central declared bankruptcy on June 21, 1970. The Penn Central continued to operate into 1974, until President Richard Nixon signed the Regional Rail Reorganization Act on January 2. Most (but not all) of the Penn Central's tracks were turned over to a new corporation, Conrail. The Penn Central continued to operate as a freight-only railroad, but reorganization efforts failed. In March 1976, the Railroad Revitalization and Regulatory Reform Act folded the remainder of the Penn Central into Conrail as well.

Of those railroads which had trackage rights to use the bypass, more than half used only that portion of the line west of the former Pennsylvania Railroad's Cleveland and Pittsburgh Railroad (then Conrail's Cleveland Line).

In 1997, Conrail was jointly purchased by CSX and the Norfolk Southern Railway. CSX obtained the Cleveland Short Line. As of 2010, CSX maintained 21 miles (34 km) of double track, and 1 mile (1.6 km) of single track. The Cleveland Short Line east of Short Line Junction is now CSX's Short Line Subdivision.

== Original route ==
As originally constructed, the Cleveland Short Line had 19.63 miles (31.59 km) of track and 22.23 miles (35.78 km) of sidings. The track grade was an extremely light 0.3 percent.

The Cleveland Short Line connected with the Lake Shore & Southern Michigan at West Park; with the Cleveland, Cincinnati, Chicago and St. Louis Railway at Linndale; with the Cleveland, Lorain & Wheeling Railroad at Parma; with the Lake Erie and Pittsburgh Railway; with the Newburgh and South Shore Railroad at Newburgh; with the Baltimore & Ohio, the Lake Erie & Pittsburgh, the Cleveland & Pittsburgh, and the Wheeling & Lake Erie in southeast Cleveland; and with the New York, Chicago & St. Louis (the "Nickel Plate") in eastern Cleveland. It had trackage rights on the Nickel Plate to the Collinwood yard for the Lake Shore and Southern Michigan. No at-grade crossings of streets were permitted, requiring either bridges or tunnels at numerous parts of the line.

The entire route consisted of four tracks, except over the bridge spanning the Cuyahoga River. The right of way permitted the line to be expanded to six tracks.

== See also ==
- Cleveland Belt and Terminal Railroad, a closer-in bypass owned by the Wheeling and Lake Erie Railway
- Cleveland railroad history

== Bibliography ==
- Borkowski, Richard C. (2008). Norfolk Southern Railway. Minneapolis: MBI Publishing Co. and Voyageur Press. ISBN 9780760332498.
- "The Cleveland Short Line Railway". The Railway Age. December 20, 1907. pp. 875, 877.
- New York Central Railroad Company (1915). Report of the Board of Directors to the Stockholders For the Fiscal Year Ended December 31, 1915 (Report). New York. hdl:2027/iau.31858051351108.
- Poor, Henry V. (1915). Poor's Manual of the Railroads of the United States, 1915. New York: Poor's Railroad Manual Co. hdl:2027/mdp.39015039344240.
