= New Castle Subdivision =

Railway line in Pennsylvania and Ohio

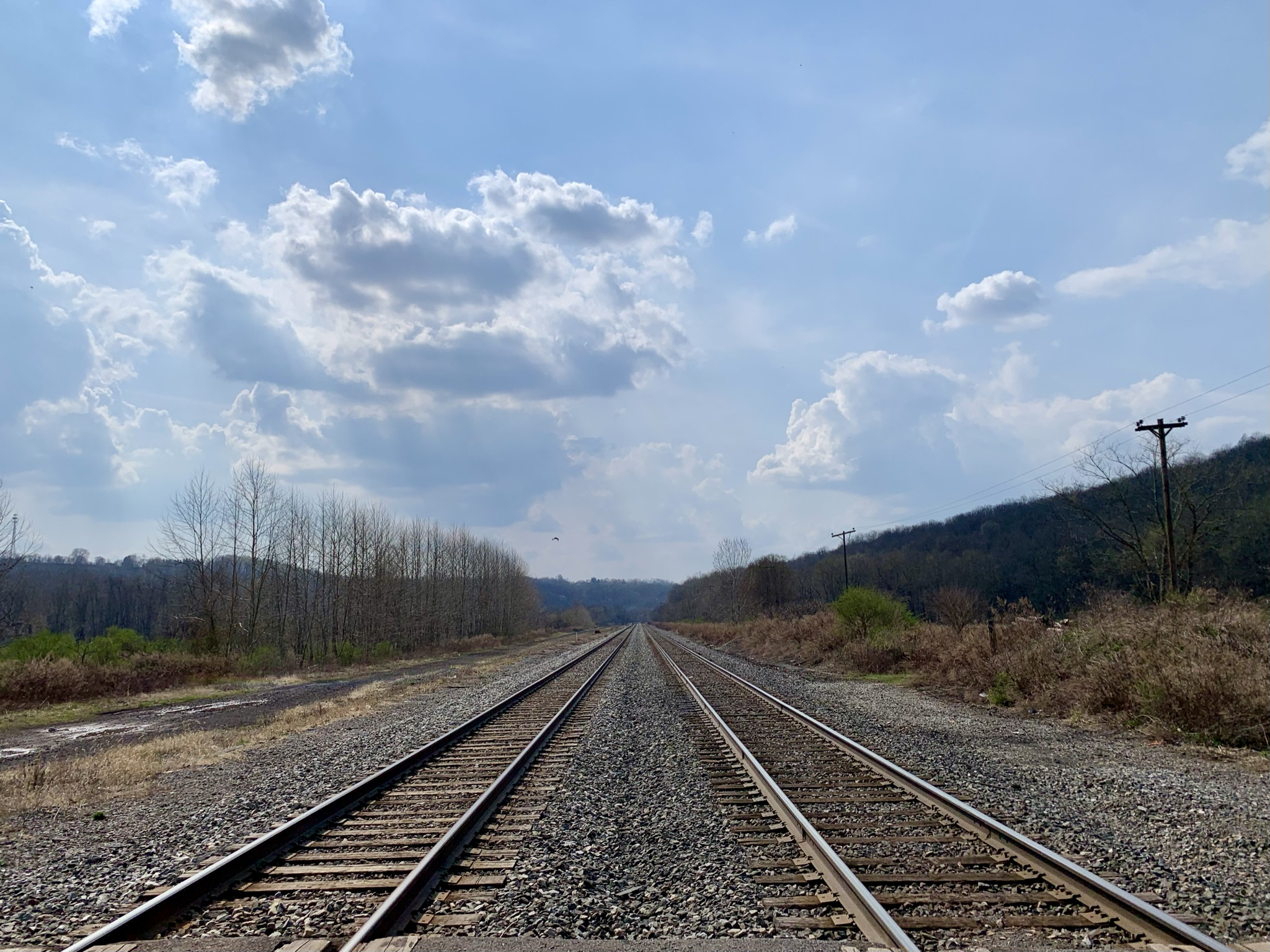
- Looking westbound on the New Castle Subdivision in Mahoning Township, Lawrence County, PA

Overview
- Status: Operational
- Owner: CSX Transportation
- Locale: Pennsylvania and Ohio
- Termini: New Castle, Pennsylvania; Greenwich, Ohio

Service
- Type: Freight rail
- System: CSX Transportation
- Operator: CSX Transportation

Technical
- Line length: 134.5 miles
- Num of tracks: 1-2
- Track gauge: 4 ft 8 1/2 in (1,435 mm) standard gauge
- Operating speed: 55–60 mph (89–97 km/h)

The New Castle Subdivision is a railroad line owned and operated by CSX Transportation in the U.S. states of Pennsylvania and Ohio. The line runs from New Castle, Pennsylvania west through Youngstown and Akron to Greenwich, Ohio along a former Baltimore and Ohio Railroad line. Its east end is near Mahoningtown, at the west end of the New Castle Terminal Subdivision. Its west end is at the Willard Terminal Subdivision, just east of the Greenwich Subdivision junction at Greenwich. It junctions with the Newton Falls Subdivision at Newton Falls, Ohio, and the CL&W Subdivision at Sterling, Ohio.

== History ==
The first tracks along this route were opened in 1879 by the Pittsburgh and Lake Erie Railroad, connecting Pittsburgh, Pennsylvania to Youngstown, Ohio via New Castle. The Pittsburgh, Cleveland and Toledo Railroad opened tracks from New Castle to Youngstown and a line continuing west to Valley Junction (near Akron, Ohio) in 1884. On August 1, 1887, much of PC&T's railway was leased by the Pittsburgh and Western Railway Company for passenger service directly between Chicago, Illinois to Philadelphia, Pennsylvania. Soon thereafter, the PC&T Railroad would be absorbed into the P&W Railroad. By 1902, the Baltimore & Ohio Railroad took over the Pittsburgh & Western Railroad and converted all of its tracks to standard gauge.

As the P&LE improved their single-track line, B&O's route followed a similar path between Pittsburgh and Youngstown. B&O's route, however had high grades and curves throughout Pittsburgh. By 1934, the B&O opted to instead purchase trackage rights between McKeesport and New Castle. It would prove to be a major rail line through the region, connecting major industrial cities such as Youngstown, Akron, and Pittsburgh. B&O eventually merged with other railroads to form the Chessie System in 1973, which would own the tracks on the current New Castle Subdivision between New Castle and Greenwich.

Chessie System later merged with Seaboard Coast Line Industries to form CSX in 1980. By 1993, the P&LE was purchased by CSX, giving the company full control over the New Castle Subdivision and the New Castle Terminal Subdivision.

=== New Castle Terminal Subdivision ===
The New Castle Terminal Subdivision runs for 14.7 miles northwest from the terminus of the Pittsburgh Subdivision in West Pittsburg, Pennsylvania to the terminus of the New Castle Subdivision near New Castle. Much of the line coexists with the CSX New Castle yard. It junctions with the P&W Subdivision near Mahoningtown.
