= CL&W Subdivision =

Railway line in Ohio

- Map

Overview
- Status: Operational
- Owner: CSX Transportation
- Locale: Ohio
- Termini: Sterling, Ohio; Lorain, Ohio

Service
- Type: Freight rail
- System: CSX Transportation
- Operator(s): CSX Transportation

Technical
- Line length: 134.5 miles
- Number of tracks: 1
- Track gauge: 4 ft 8 1/2 in (1,435 mm) standard gauge

The CL&W Subdivision is a railroad line owned and operated by CSX Transportation in the U.S. state of Ohio. The line runs from a junction with the New Castle Subdivision at Sterling northwest to Lorain along a former Baltimore and Ohio Rail Road line (once the Cleveland, Lorain and Wheeling Railway). It junctions with the Cleveland Subdivision at Lester and the Greenwich Subdivision at Grafton.

== History ==
=== Early history as an independent railroad ===
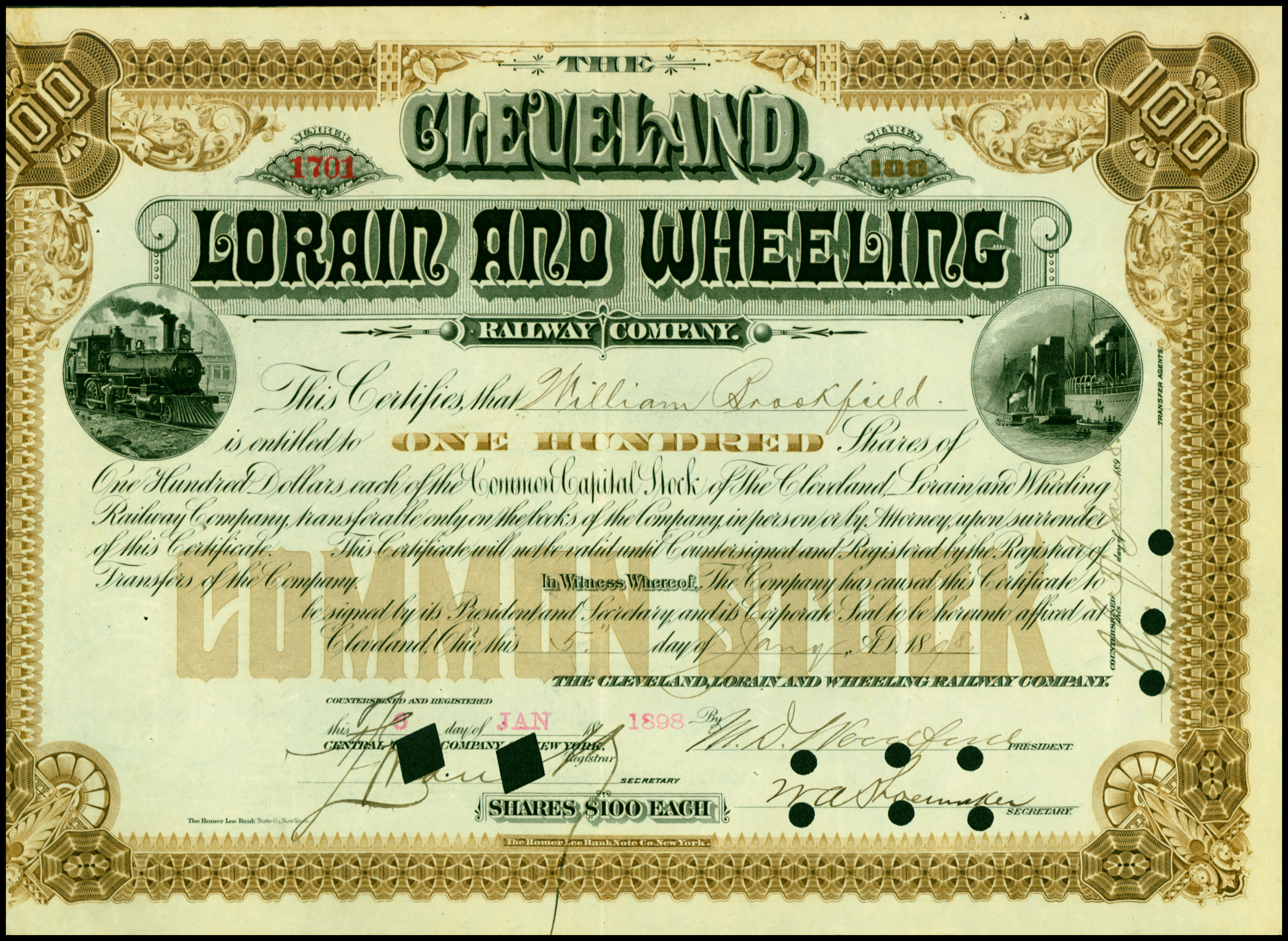
Share of the Cleveland, Lorain and Wheeling Railway Company, issued 5. January 1898

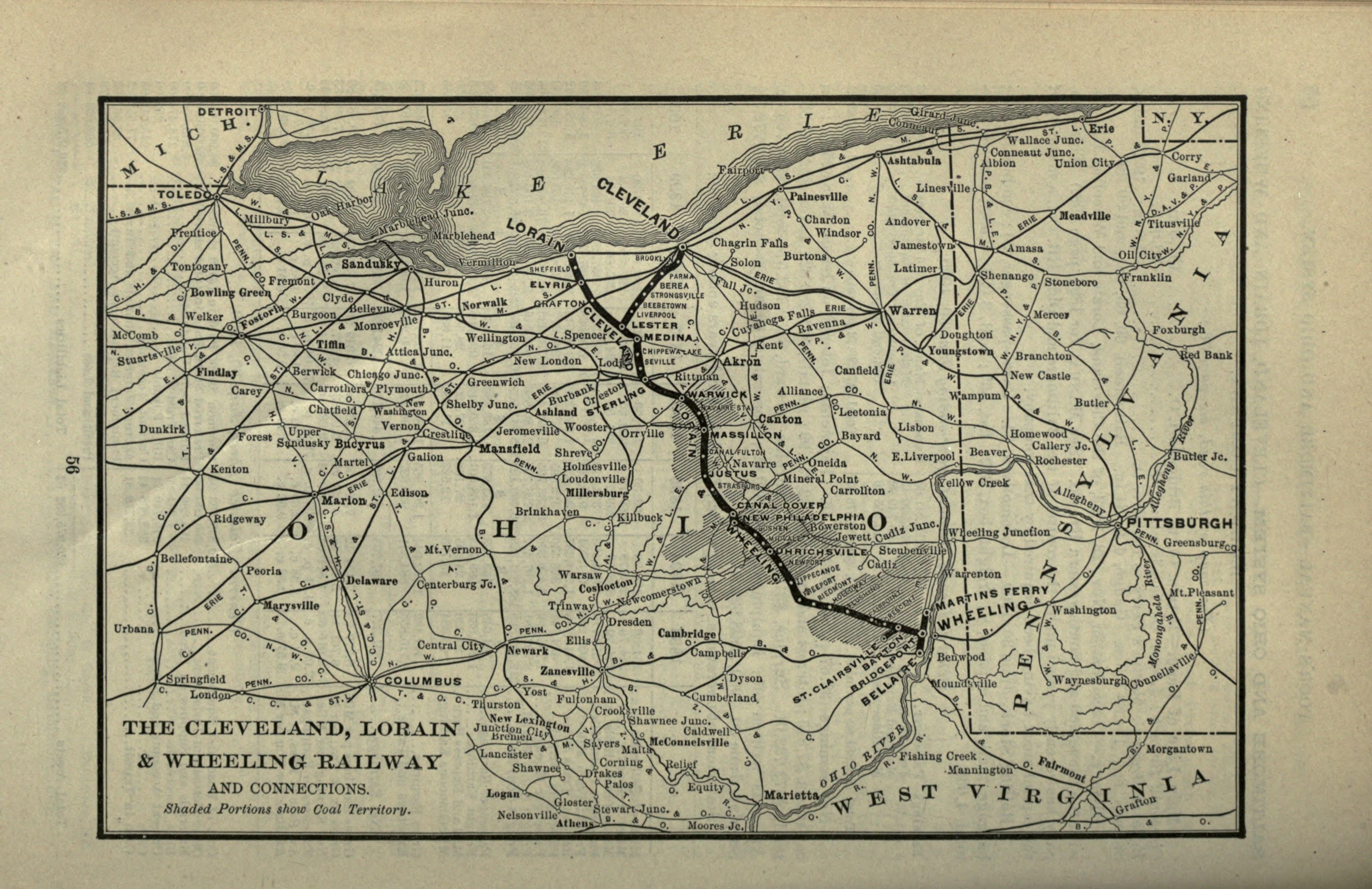
Map of the Cleveland, Lorain and Wheeling Railway

The Lake Shore and Tuscarawas Valley Railway Company (LS&TV) was chartered by the state of Ohio on July 2, 1870. It was granted authority to build a line from Berea, Ohio, to Mill Township in Tuscarawas County, Ohio, where it would join the Pittsburgh, Cincinnati, Chicago and St. Louis Railroad line. A branch to Elyria, Ohio, was also authorized. In October 1872, the company purchased the 8-mile (13 km) long Elyria and Black River Railway Company (E&BR; chartered in 1871), which allowed for completion of the main line between Berea and Uhrichsville, Ohio. The Elyria branch was completed in August 1873.

In March 1873, the LS&TV filed an amendment to its charter to allow it to extend its tracks south to Washington Township in Tuscarawas County. But the LS&TV fell into receivership in July 1874 for failing to pay its mortgage on the E&BR, and the E&BR was sold for $1 million to Cleveland railroad executive Selah Chamberlain. On January 30, 1875, Chamberlain sold the E&BR to Amasa Stone, Robert L. Chamberlain (Selah's son), Ebenezer B. Thomas, Clement Russell, and Edward Kent (an investor from New York City). These owners formed the Cleveland, Tuscarawas Valley and Wheeling Railway (CTV&W) to take over the assets of the LS&TV.

The CTV&W filed a charter amendment in March 1877 to extend its line from Uhrichsville south through Tuscarawas, Harrison, Belmont counties to West Wheeling, Ohio, on the Ohio River (just south of Bridgeport). But the railroad once again fell into receivership in February 1883, and Edward R. Perkins purchased it for just under $2.9 million.

Perkins immediately sold the railroad back to an investors' group led by Stone, and which included Selah Chamberlain, Worthy S. Streator (a major creditor of the line), Robert L. Chamberlain, and Andrew J. Baggs. They filed a charter on March 1, 1883, to incorporate the Cleveland, Lorain and Wheeling Railway (CL&W), which would assume the assets of the CTV&W.

In June 1886, the CL&W filed an amendment to their charter to extend the line south of West Wheeling to the town of Bellaire, Ohio. In August 1887, another amendment extended the line a short distance north into Bridgeport.

=== B&O ownership ===
System Map of the CL&W under B&O ownership

In 1898, a high-level bridge crossing of the Ohio River was made at Bellaire, connecting the CL&W with the Baltimore and Ohio Railroad (B&O).

In February 1901, the CL&W had about $5 million in preferred stock. Elsewhere, the B&O fell into receivership on February 28, 1896. By the time the B&O emerged from bankruptcy in 1901, the Pennsylvania Railroad had obtained a controlling (if minority) interest in the road's stock. In December 1901, the B&O purchased $2.7 million of preferred stock in the CL&W, giving it a controlling interest in the company. The B&O made additional purchases of CL&W stock over the next six years, until in March 1908 it purchased all remaining outstanding shares and made the CL&W a subsidiary of the road.

=== C&O/Chessie System/CSX ownership ===
The CL&W remained part of the B&O until 1963. During the 1950s and 1960s, the Pennsylvania Railroad and the New York Central Railroad fought for control of the B&O. But beginning in 1960, the Chesapeake and Ohio Railway (C&O) began purchasing large quantities of B&O preferred stock. By March 1962 it controlled 60 percent of the B&O. But the Pennsylvania and the New York Central agreed to a merger in March 1962, putting an end to this competition. The C&O then sought sole ownership of the B&O, and succeeded in acquiring the New York Central's 20 percent share. The merger was approved by the Interstate Commerce Commission in March 1963.

The C&O formed a holding company, the Chessie System, in 1973. The B&O continued to operate as a distinct company under the Chessie System. The Chessie System merged with Seaboard Coast Line Industries (owner of the Seaboard Coast Line Railroad, the Louisville and Nashville Railroad, the Clinchfield Railroad, and the Georgia Railroad and Banking Company) on November 1, 1980, to form CSX Corporation.

CSX Corporation assigned its railroads to a new subsidiary, CSX Transportation, on July 1, 1986. The B&O's distinct identity ended in October 1986 (one year before the railroad itself was absorbed by the C&O and CSX), at which time the CL&W was downgraded to become a subdivision of CSX Transportation.

== Description of the line ==
The CL&W Subdivision consists of a portion of the former track of the Cleveland, Lorain, & Wheeling Railway, and as of 2010 was 41 miles (66 km) long. The northern terminus of the CL&W Subdivision is with the Lake Terminal Railroad at Lorain, Ohio, near the shore of Lake Erie just west of the Black River. It travels south-southeast and south to pass through Elyria, where it crosses the Norfolk Southern's Cleveland-Toledo-Chicago Line. It continues south-southeast and then southeast to Grafton, where there is a connection with CSX's Greenwich Subdivision. It continues southeast to Lester, (a small town on Ohio State Route 57 about 6 miles (9.7 km) northwest of Medina), where it connects with CSX's Cleveland Subdivision. It partially follows Mallet Creek south, then passes below the Wheeling and Lake Erie Railway west of Medina (about 0.4 miles (0.64 km) northwest of U.S. Route 42). After an at-grade crossing of U.S. Route 42, It continues south-southeast, passing east of Chippewa Lake, below Interstate 71 and Interstate 76, and through the town of Seville before reaching its southern terminus with CSX's New Castle Subdivision at Sterling.

The CL&W Subdivision is a single track line, except for 2 miles (3.2 km) of double track at Sterling. Trains are limited to 10 to 25 miles per hour (16 to 40 km/h) along the entire length of the line.

== See also ==
- Cleveland railroad history

== Bibliography ==
- Baltimore and Ohio Railroad Company (1898). Seventy-Second Annual Report of the President and Directors to the Stockholders of the Baltimore and Ohio Railroad Company for the Year Ended June 30, 1898. Baltimore: John P. Lucas Printing Co.
- Ohio Commissioner of Railroads and Telegraphs (1888). Annual Report of the Commissioner of Railroads and Telegraphs, to the Governor of the State Ohio, for the Year 1887. Columbus, Ohio: The Westbote Company, State Printers.
