= Chicago Line =

The following rail lines are known as the Chicago Line:

- Conrail's Chicago Line, Chicago to Albany, now the following Norfolk Southern and CSX lines:
  - Chicago Line (Norfolk Southern), Chicago to Cleveland
  - Cleveland Terminal Subdivision (CSX), Cleveland
  - Erie West Subdivision (CSX), Cleveland to Erie
  - Lake Shore Subdivision (CSX), Erie to Buffalo
  - Rochester Subdivision (CSX), Buffalo to Syracuse
  - Mohawk Subdivision (CSX), Syracuse to Amsterdam
  - part of the Selkirk Subdivision (CSX), Amsterdam to Hoffmans
  - part of the Hudson Subdivision (CSX), Hoffmans to Albany
