= Kamm's Corners =

Neighborhood of Cleveland, Ohio, United States

- Neighborhood of Cleveland
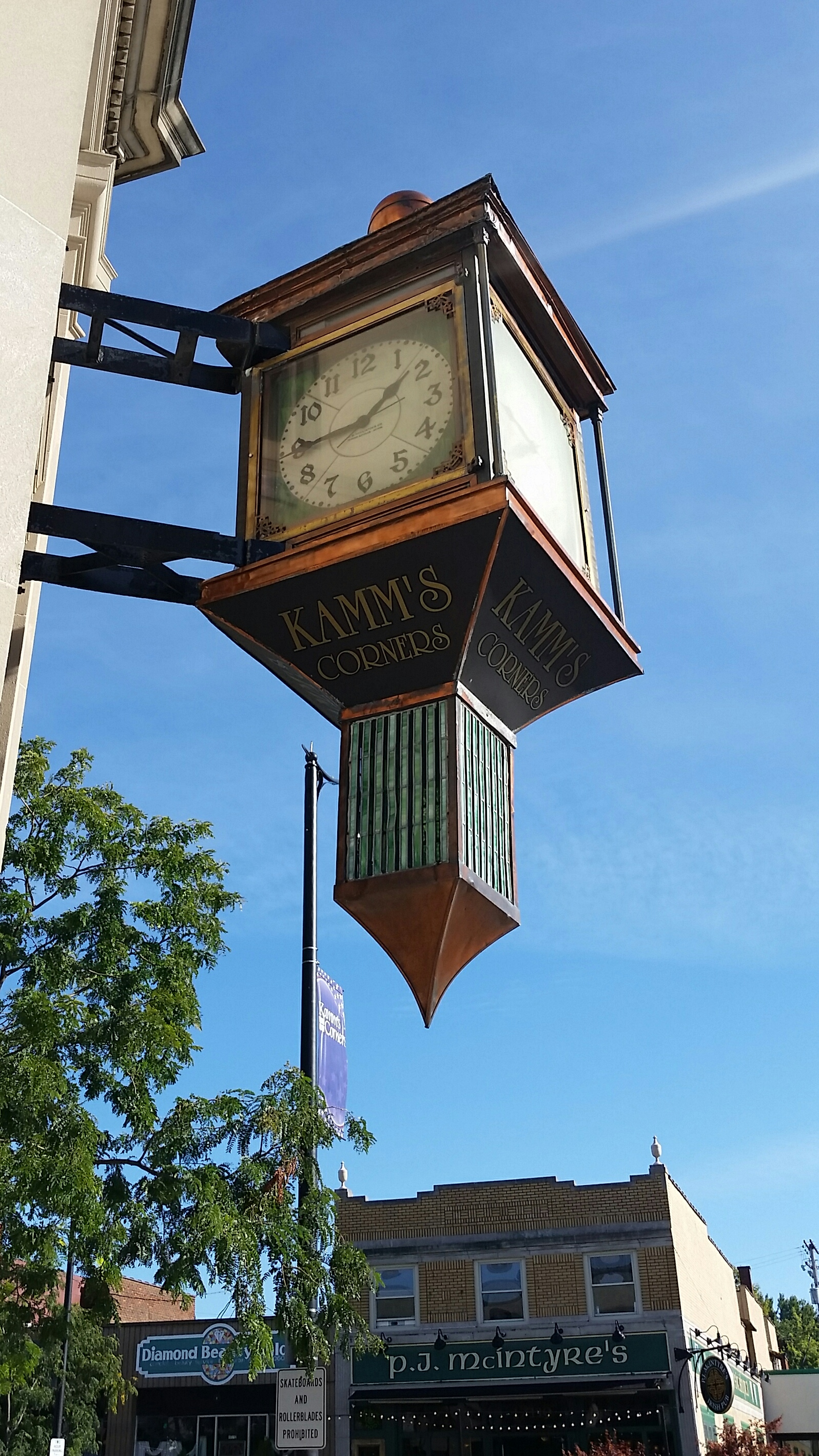
- Kamm's Corners clock, at the intersection of Lorain Avenue (SR 10) and Rocky River Drive (SR 237)

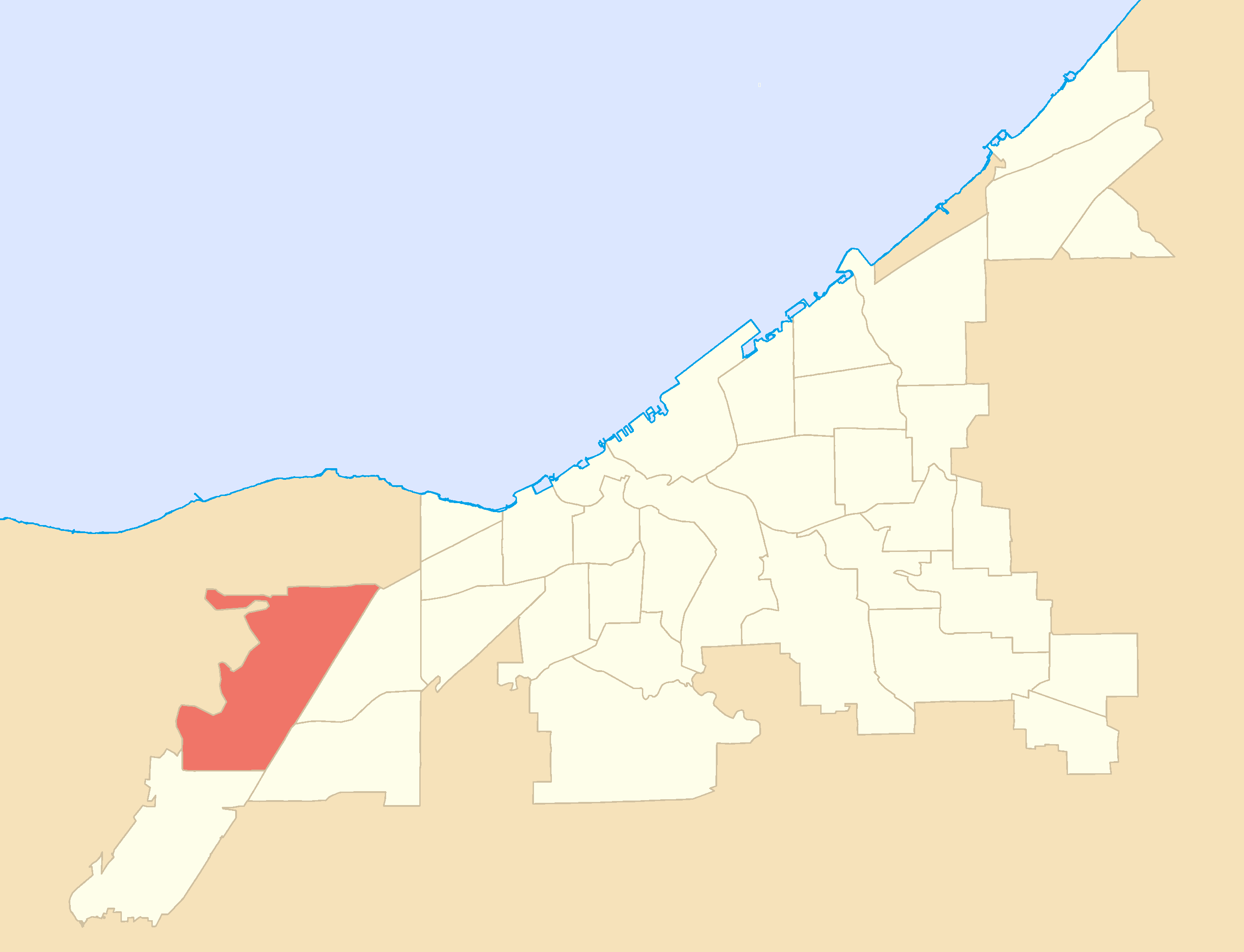
- Coordinates: 41°26′39″N 81°49′07″W
- Country: United States
- State: Ohio
- County: Cuyahoga County
- City: Cleveland
- Neighborhoods: list

Population (2020)
  - Total: 25,357

Demographics
  - White: 77%
  - Black: 13%
  - Hispanic (of any race): 14.6%
  - Asian and Pacific Islander: 4.7%
  - Mixed and Other: 5.3%
- Time zone: UTC-5 (EST)
  - Summer (DST): UTC-4 (EDT)
- ZIP Codes: 44111, 44135
- Area code: 216
- Median income: $54,092
- Source: 2020 U.S. Census, City Planning Commission of Cleveland

Kamm's Corners is a neighborhood on the West Side of Cleveland, Ohio. It is bounded by the streetcar suburb of Lakewood to the north, the Rocky River Reservation of the Cleveland Metroparks and the suburbs of Rocky River and Fairview Park to the west, the New York Central Railroad tracks (now Amtrak) to the east, and Puritas Road to the south. Kamm's Corners Plaza and Warren Village are the major retail centers of the neighborhood. According to the 2019 U.S. census estimate, the neighborhood has the highest concentration of Irish Americans in Cleveland and Cuyahoga County.

== History ==
Kamm's Corners derives its name from local merchant Oswald Kamm. Kamm emigrated from Switzerland to Cleveland and in 1875 he purchased four acres at the southwest corner of Lorain Avenue and Rocky River Drive. He opened a general store which also served as the local post office. The original store was torn down in 1900 and a second store was built on the same site which still stands in the Kamm's Corners retail district.

The neighborhood is one of four sub-neighborhoods that comprise the larger historical neighborhood of West Park, the others being Jefferson, Bellaire–Puritas, and Hopkins. Named for early settler John West, West Park was annexed to Cleveland in 1923 and became the last large suburb to become part of the city.
