= Jefferson, Cleveland =

Neighborhood of Cleveland, Ohio, United States

Jefferson
- Neighborhood of Cleveland
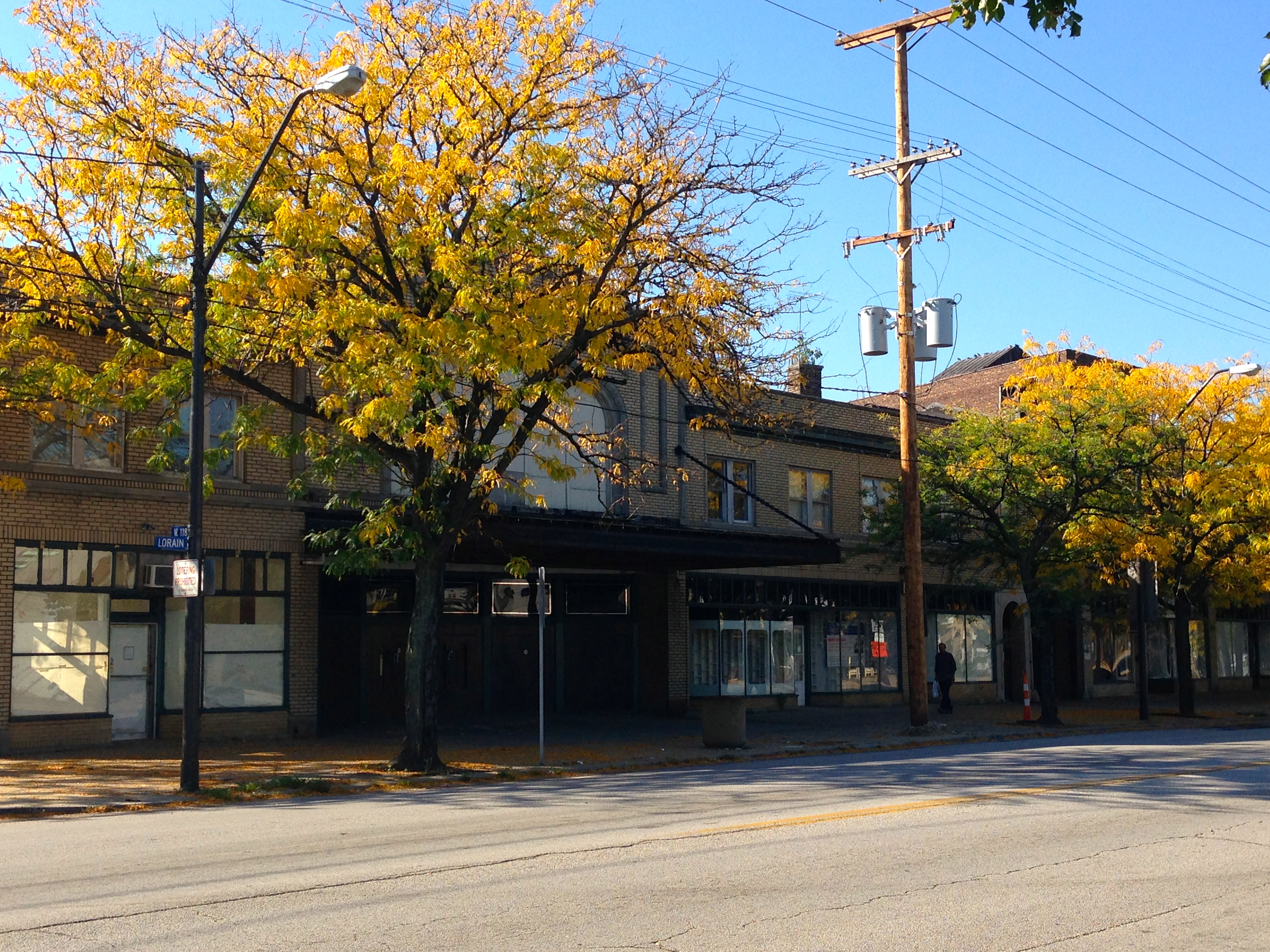
- Exterior of the historical Variety Theatre on West 118th and Lorain Avenue before its restoration, September 2014.

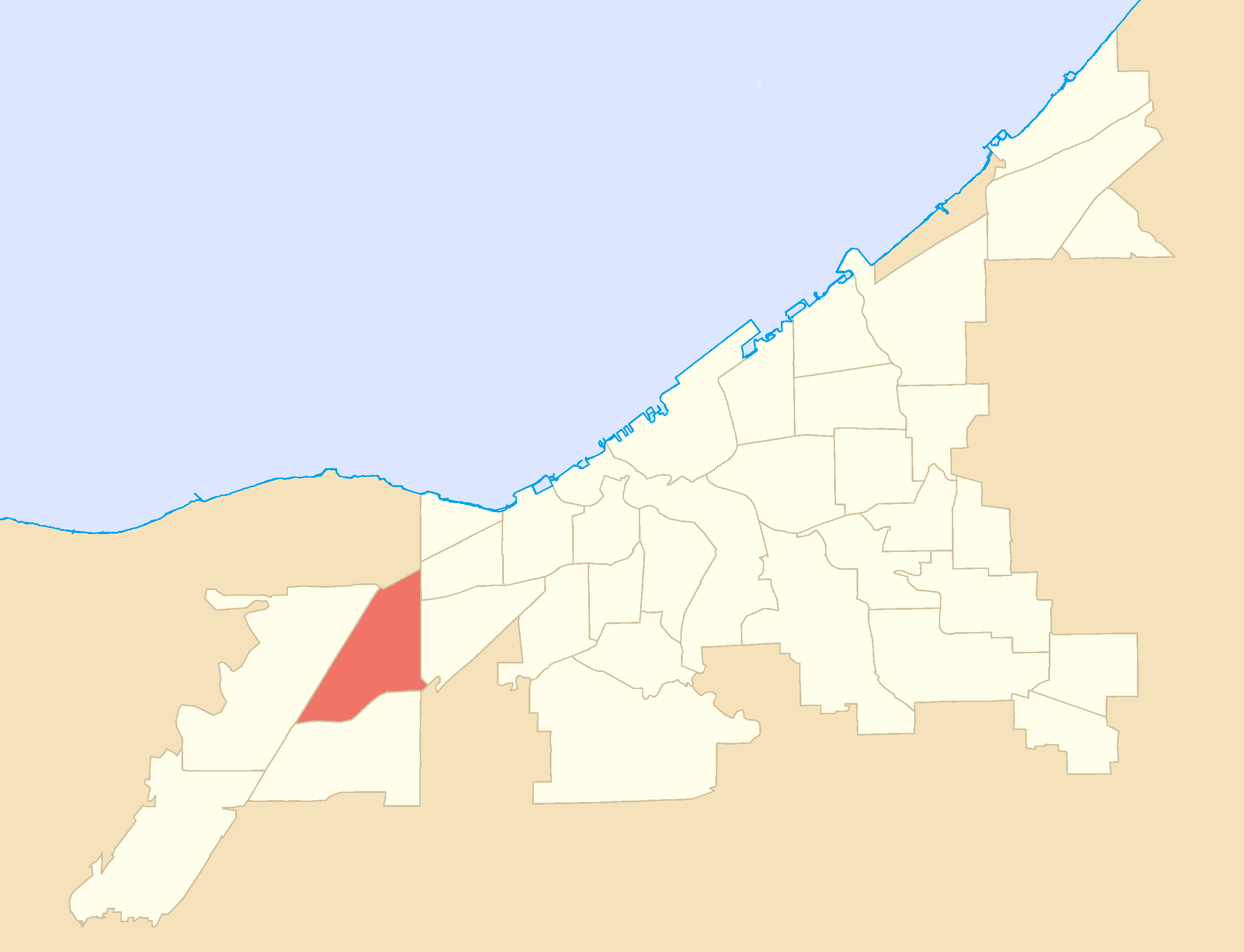
- Coordinates: 41°26′39″N 81°49′07″W
- Country: United States
- State: Ohio
- County: Cuyahoga County
- City: Cleveland
- Neighborhoods: list

Population (2020)
  - Total: 18,121

Demographics
  - White: 65.4%
  - Black: 14.6%
  - Hispanic (of any race): 21.9%
  - Asian: 4.1%
  - Mixed and Other: 15.8%
- Time zone: UTC-5 (EST)
  - Summer (DST): UTC-4 (EDT)
- ZIP Codes: 44111, 44135
- Area code: 216
- Median income: $39,635
- Source: 2020 U.S. Census

Jefferson is a neighborhood on the West Side of Cleveland, Ohio. It is bounded by the neighborhoods of West Boulevard and Cudell and the village of Linndale to the east, Bellaire–Puritas to the south, Kamm's Corners to the west, and the streetcar suburb of Lakewood to the north. It is one of four sub-neighborhoods that comprise the larger historical neighborhood of West Park, the others being Kamm's Corners, Bellaire–Puritas, and Hopkins.

As of 2019, the neighborhood has an estimated foreign-born population of 14.3%, with immigrants from Latin America (especially El Salvador and Mexico), the Middle East, Romania, and Vietnam. The Variety Theatre at West 118th and Lorain is one of the major landmarks of Jefferson. Originally built in 1927 and listed on the National Register of Historic Places, it has been renovated and came under new ownership in 2022.
