= Short Line Subdivision (Ohio) =

Railway line in Ohio

Cleveland Short Line Subdivision
- Map

Overview
- Status: Active
- Owner: CSX Transportation
- Locale: Cleveland

Service
- Type: Freight
- System: CSX Transportation
- Operator(s): CSX Transportation

Technical
- Number of tracks: 2
- Track gauge: 4 ft 8 1/2 in (1,435 mm) standard gauge

The Short Line Subdivision is a railroad line owned by CSX Transportation in the U.S. state of Ohio. The line runs from a point northeast of downtown Cleveland south and southwest to Berea along a former New York Central Railroad line.

At its east end, the Short Line Subdivision merges with the Cleveland Terminal Subdivision towards Buffalo, New York. Its west end is at Berea, where the Greenwich Subdivision continues southwest towards Columbus, meeting lines to Chicago and Indianapolis along the way. The Short Line Subdivision has a junction with the Cleveland Subdivision south of downtown Cleveland.

== History ==
The line east of the curve near Brook Park (Short Line Junction) was built by the Cleveland Short Line Railway and opened in 1910 and 1912; the rest from Short Line Junction southwest to Berea was opened in 1850 by the Cleveland, Columbus and Cincinnati Railroad. Through mergers, leases, and takeovers, the lines became part of the New York Central Railroad and Conrail. When Conrail was broken up in 1999, the current Short Line Subdivision was assigned to CSX.
