= West Boulevard =

Neighborhood of Cleveland, Ohio, United States

Coordinates: 41.459°N 81.755°W

- Neighborhood of Cleveland
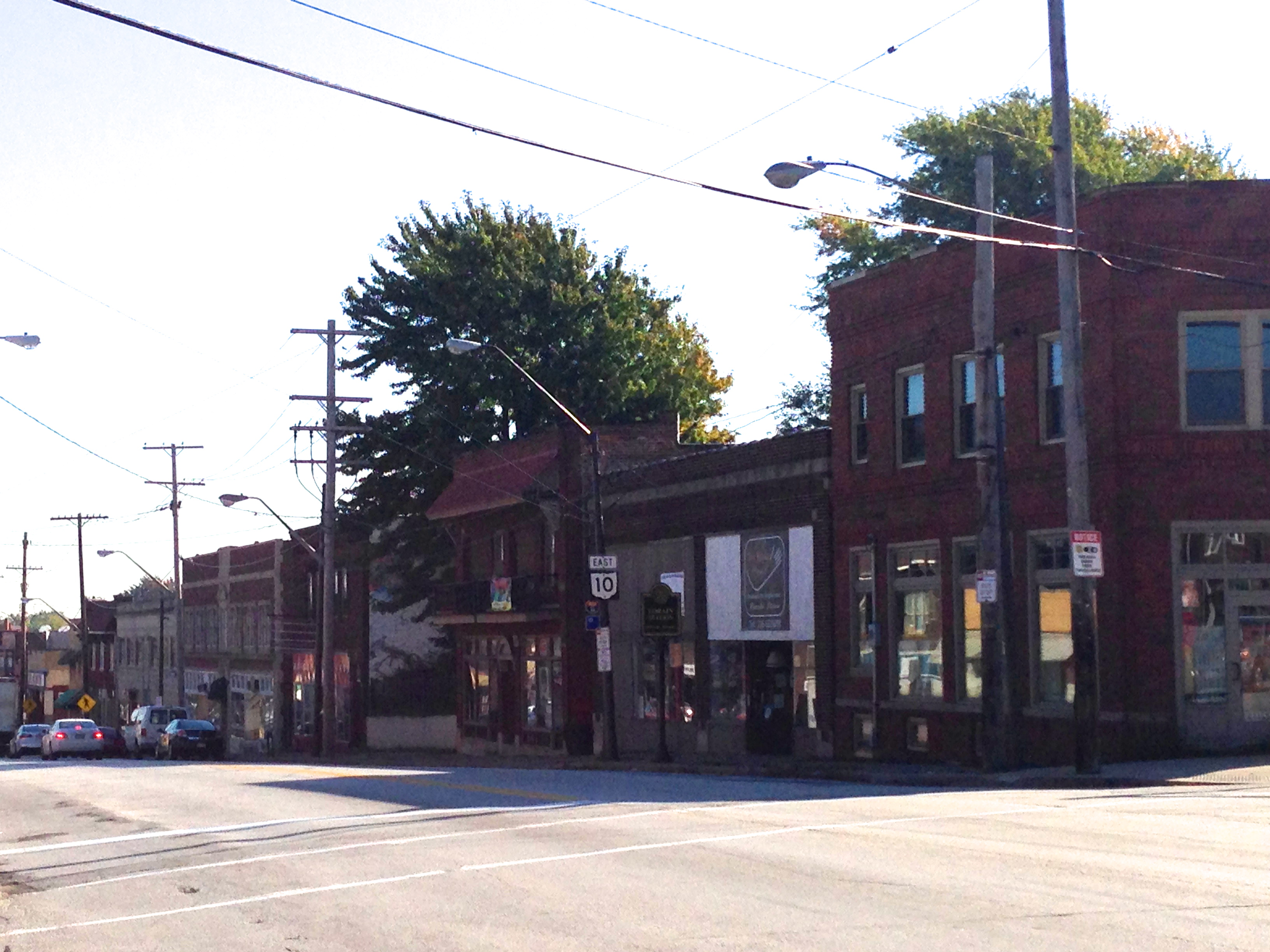
- Lorain Station Historic District in West Boulevard

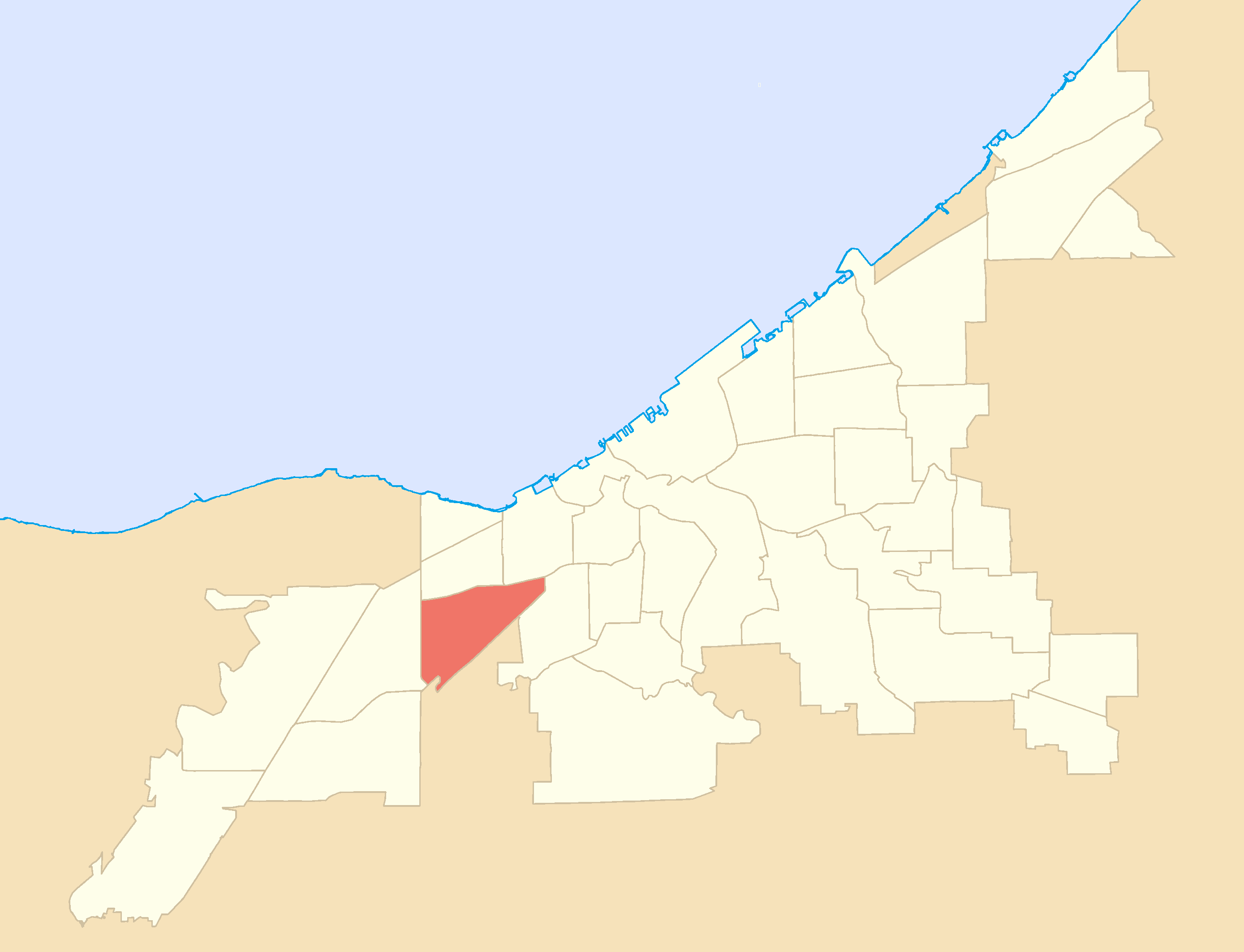
- Country: United States
- State: Ohio
- County: Cuyahoga County
- City: Cleveland

Population (2020)
  - Total: 19,737

Demographics
  - White: 55.5%
  - Black: 23.8%
  - Hispanic (of any race): 27.5%
  - Asian and Pacific Islander: 3.2%
  - Mixed and Other: 17.5%
- Time zone: UTC-5 (EST)
  - Summer (DST): UTC-4 (EDT)
- Area code: 216
- Median income: $33,784
- Source: 2020 U.S. Census

West Boulevard is a neighborhood on the West Side of Cleveland, Ohio. It borders the suburbs of Brooklyn and Linndale to the south, Interstate 90 and the neighborhoods of Cudell and Detroit–Shoreway to the north, Stockyards to the east, and Jefferson to the west. Its name is derived "from the West Blvd. thoroughfare which runs north-south through the district’s center."

The principal portion of the neighborhood was incorporated into Cleveland in 1902 as part of Linndale. One year later, Cleveland annexed the majority of the land as what is now known as the West Boulevard neighborhood.

West Boulevard has been historically home to a mixed population of Hungarians, Czechs, and Germans, and in recent years, it has also been home to a growing Hispanic community. As of 2019, the neighborhood had an estimated foreign-born population of 18.5%, with most being immigrants from Latin America (especially El Salvador and Mexico) and Vietnam.

Notable neighborhood attractions include the St. Ignatius of Antioch Catholic Church, completed in 1903, and Ray's MTB Indoor Park, the world's first multi-terrain indoor bike park.
