= Linndale, Ohio =

- Village
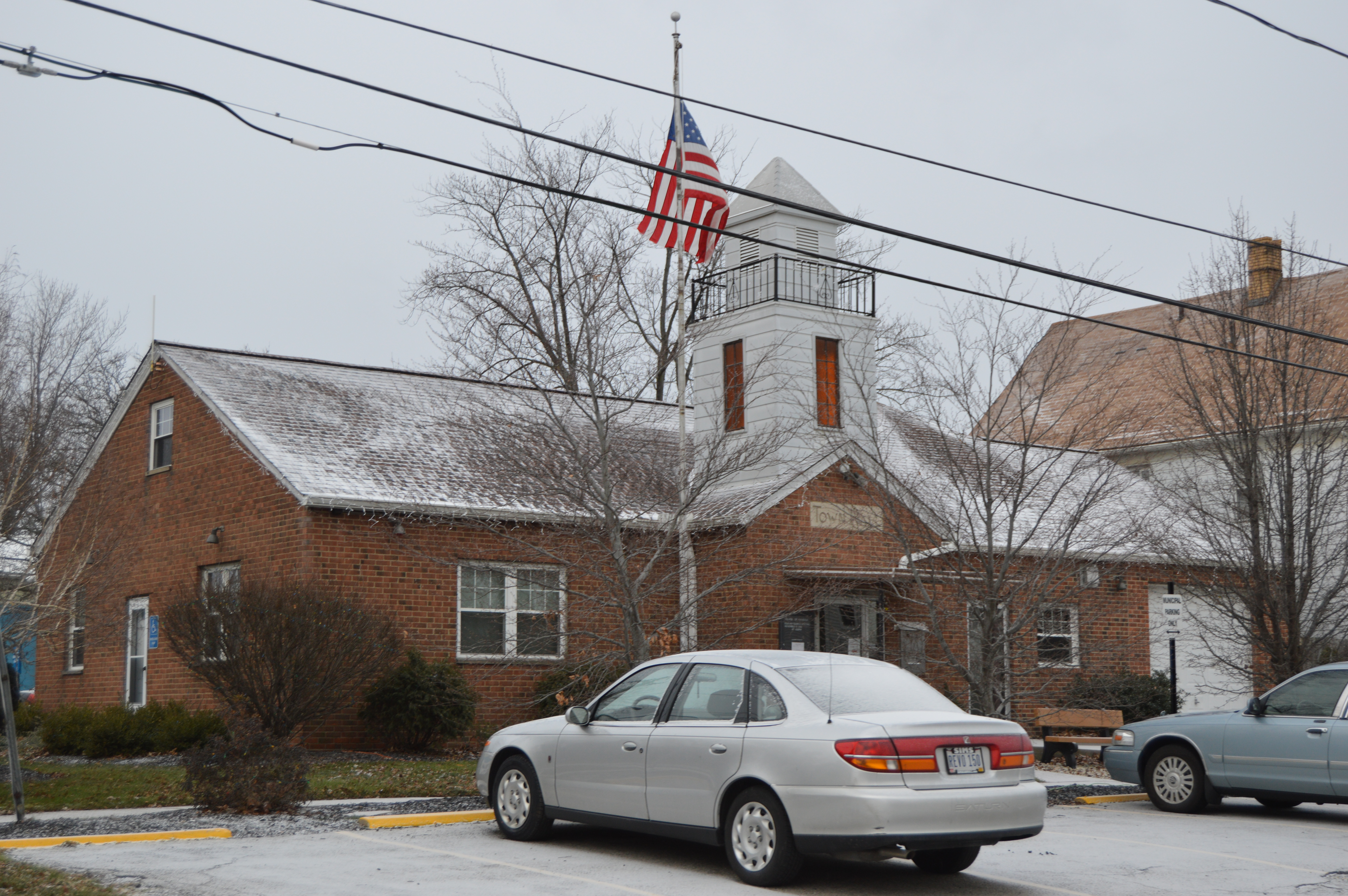
- Village Hall
- Interactive map of Linndale, Ohio
- Location within Ohio Location within the United States
- Coordinates: 41°26′39″N 81°46′3″W
- Country: United States
- State: Ohio
- County: Cuyahoga

Government
  - Mayor: Ashlee McLaughlin (D)

Area
  - Total: 0.073 sq mi (0.19 km^{2})
  - Land: 0.073 sq mi (0.19 km^{2})
  - Water: 0 sq mi (0.00 km^{2})
- Elevation: 755 ft (230 m)

Population (2020)
  - Total: 108
  - Density: 1,485.5/sq mi (573.54/km^{2})
- Time zone: UTC-5 (Eastern (EST))
  - Summer (DST): UTC-4 (EDT)
- ZIP code: 44135
- Area code: 216
- FIPS code: 39-43918
- GNIS feature ID: 1065002
- Website: www.linndalevillage-oh.gov

Linndale is the smallest village in Cuyahoga County, Ohio, United States. It is landlocked, surrounded by the city of Cleveland and the suburb of Brooklyn. According to the 2020 census, the population was 108.

== History ==
Linndale, Ohio was incorporated in 1902 as a small village on the outskirts of Cleveland. George Linn, a late 19th century real-estate developer, would be the main advocate for its incorporation. In the Prohibition era, Linndale developed a reputation as a notorious gambling district. In 1930, Linndale would start hosting trains in a switchyard and retrofitting them with electric engines to enter the Cleveland Union Terminal. Following WW2, the demise of the steam engine led to the switchyards becoming obsolete.

== Geography ==
Linndale is located at 41°26′39″N 81°46′3″W (41.444050, -81.767476).

According to the United States Census Bureau, the village has a total area of 0.08 square miles (0.21 km^{2}), all land. The southeast border is along the municipal limits of Brooklyn; the remainder of Linndale is surrounded by Cleveland, specifically the neighborhoods of West Boulevard, Jefferson, and Bellaire–Puritas.

== Demographics ==
Historical population
Census	Pop.	Note	%±
1910	512		—
1920	490		−4.3%
1930	400		−18.4%
1940	445		11.3%
1950	399		−10.3%
1960	381		−4.5%
1970	169		−55.6%
1980	129		−23.7%
1990	159		23.3%
2000	117		−26.4%
2010	179		53.0%
2020	108		−39.7%
U.S. Decennial Census

=== 2020 census ===
Linndale village, Ohio – Racial and ethnic composition Note: the US Census treats Hispanic/Latino as an ethnic category. This table excludes Latinos from the racial categories and assigns them to a separate category. Hispanics/Latinos may be of any race.
Race / Ethnicity (NH = Non-Hispanic)	Pop 2000	Pop 2010	Pop 2020	% 2000	% 2010	% 2020
White alone (NH)	80	96	72	68.38%	53.63%	66.67%
Black or African American alone (NH)	22	49	12	18.80%	27.37%	11.11%
Native American or Alaska Native alone (NH)	1	0	0	0.85%	0.00%	0.00%
Asian alone (NH)	0	0	0	0.00%	0.00%	0.00%
Native Hawaiian or Pacific Islander alone (NH)	0	3	0	0.00%	1.68%	0.00%
Other race alone (NH)	0	0	4	0.00%	0.00%	3.70%
Mixed race or Multiracial (NH)	5	0	0	4.27%	0.00%	0.00%
Hispanic or Latino (any race)	9	31	20	7.69%	17.32%	18.52%
Total	117	179	108	100.00%	100.00%	100.00%

As of the census of 2020, there were 108 people, 58 households, and 33 families residing in the village. The population density was 1,350 inhabitants per square mile (520/km^{2}). There were 60 housing units at an average density of 750 per square mile (290/km^{2}). The racial makeup of the village was 68.5% White, 11.1% African American, and 13.9% from other races. Hispanic or Latino of any race were 18.5% of the population.

There were 58 households, of which 33.8% had children under the age of 18 living with them, 41.4% were married couples living together, 27.6 had a female householder with no husband present, 24.1% had a male householder with no wife present, and 6.9% were non-families. The average household size was 2.76 and the average family size was 3.67. The median age in the village was 39.4 years. 33.8% of residents were under the age of 18. The gender makeup of the village was 47.5% male and 52.5% female.

=== 2010 census ===
As of the census of 2010, there were 179 people, 66 households, and 38 families residing in the village. The population density was 2,237.5 inhabitants per square mile (863.9/km^{2}). There were 75 housing units at an average density of 937.5 per square mile (362.0/km^{2}). The racial makeup of the village was 65.9% White, 27.9% African American, 1.7% Pacific Islander, and 4.5% from other races. Hispanic or Latino of any race were 17.3% of the population.

There were 66 households, of which 37.9% had children under the age of 18 living with them, 19.7% were married couples living together, 28.8% had a female householder with no husband present, 9.1% had a male householder with no wife present, and 42.4% were non-families. 27.3% of all households were made up of individuals, and 4.5% had someone living alone who was 65 years of age or older. The average household size was 2.71 and the average family size was 3.24.

The median age in the village was 35.1 years. 26.3% of residents were under the age of 18; 8.4% were between the ages of 18 and 24; 35.2% were from 25 to 44; 22.9% were from 45 to 64; and 7.3% were 65 years of age or older. The gender makeup of the village was 48.6% male and 51.4% female.

=== 2000 census ===
As of the census of 2000, there were 117 people, 57 households, and 29 families residing in the village. The population density was 1,332.8 inhabitants per square mile (514.6/km^{2}). There were 71 housing units at an average density of 808.8 per square mile (312.3/km^{2}). The racial makeup of the village was 68.38% White, 18.80% African American, 0.85% Native American, 4.27% from other races, and 7.69% from two or more races. Hispanic or Latino of any race were 7.69% of the population.

There were 57 households, out of which 24.6% had children under the age of 18 living with them, 29.8% were married couples living together, 15.8% had a female householder with no husband present, and 49.1% were non-families. 43.9% of all households were made up of individuals, and 10.5% had someone living alone who was 65 years of age or older. The average household size was 2.05 and the average family size was 2.93.

In the village, the population was spread out, with 24.8% under the age of 18, 6.0% from 18 to 24, 42.7% from 25 to 44, 15.4% from 45 to 64, and 11.1% who were 65 years of age or older. The median age was 34 years. For every 100 females there were 101.7 males. For every 100 females age 18 and over, there were 79.6 males.

The median income for a household in the village was $21,500, and the median income for a family was $30,625. Males had a median income of $33,750 versus $25,893 for females. The per capita income for the village was $17,912. There were 21.7% of families and 15.7% of the population living below the poverty line, including 19.2% of under eighteens and 10.0% of those over 64.

== Controversy over traffic fines ==
Beginning under Prohibition, Linndale became notorious for its gambling and illicit alcohol. Criminals would "lay low there to escape the big-city heat" of Cleveland. After the construction of Interstate 71, however, the village became known as a speed trap, and for many years had the busiest, on a per-capita basis, Mayor's Court in the State of Ohio. The village in the past has successfully defended its legal right to enforce the 60 mph speed limit on the 422 yards (386 m) of I-71 within its jurisdiction under the "Home Rule" provisions of the state constitution. The combination of traffic enforcement and Mayor's Court has provided 80% of Linndale's one million dollar annual budget, and underwritten its four full-time and ten part-time police officers.

On December 20, 2012, Governor John Kasich signed a bill into law effective March 22, 2013, that dissolved Linndale's Mayor's Court. A sergeant in the Linndale police department stated that traffic cases would subsequently be handled by nearby Parma.

In response to decreasing revenue, Linndale has installed speed cameras on its most heavily traveled non-interstate road Memphis Avenue and is processing some traffic violations locally instead of relying on Parma Municipal Court. Another attempt to increase revenue with a proposed increase in the village income tax from 2% to 2.5% failed in an 8-12 referendum vote.

In October 2017, Linndale was featured on the internationally syndicated NPR show This American Life in episode 629 entitled Expect Delays.

== See also ==
- Macks Creek, Missouri, whose dependence on traffic-fine revenue also led to a state anti-speedtrap law.
