= CSX Bridge (Painesville, Ohio) =

CSX Painesville, Ohio
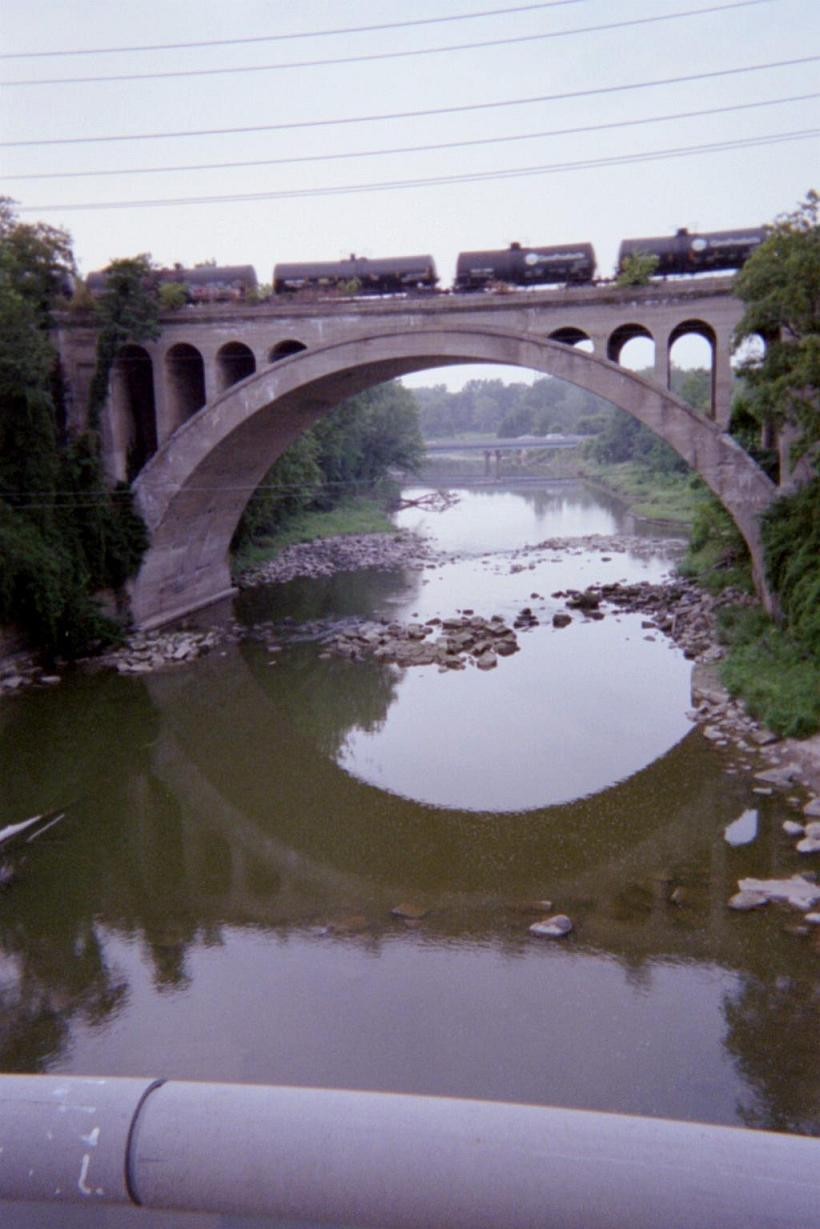
- Looking north from U.S. Route 20
- Coordinates: 41°44′17.5″N 81°13′49.0″W
- Carries: Railroad traffic
- Crosses: Grand River (Ohio)
- Locale: Painesville, Ohio
- Maintained by: CSX Transportation

Characteristics
- Total length: 350 feet (110 m)
- Clearance below: 100 feet (30 m)

The CSX Painesville bridge is a concrete viaduct located just outside city limits in Painesville Township in northeast Ohio. It is about 350 feet (110 m) long and 100 feet (30 m) above the Grand River. The bridge was built in 1908 for the Lake Shore and Michigan Southern Railway. It has served the Lake Shore, New York Central, Penn Central, Conrail, and its current owner CSX. An average 50 trains daily cross the span, including two Amtrak Lake Shore Limited trains, no. 48 and 49. The bridge is bracketed by two highway spans, just to the south is US Route 20 bridge and just to the north is Ohio State Route 2.
