= Ray's MTB Indoor Park =

Bike park in Cleveland, Ohio, United States

Ray's Indoor MTB Park in Cleveland, Ohio, Front Entrance, Photo taken 20241011

Ray's MTB Indoor Park is the world's first and largest multi-terrain indoor bike park, located in the West Boulevard neighborhood of Cleveland, Ohio, United States.

== History ==
Ray Petro opened the original Cleveland location in the second half of 2004. He did so because of his frustration in the inability to ride during the cold winters in Ohio. He invested his life savings of $50,000 and also used a $25,000 loan to fund startup costs.

A Milwaukee location opened December 31, 2010, largely due to funding by Trek. It closed in 2016. The Cleveland location has remained open over the years and has grown in size to over 180 thousand square feet.

== Business model ==
The 92,000 sq ft (8,500 m^{2}) park only operates during the colder half of the year. Whereas indoor skate parks have existed for skateboarding and BMX, and there are examples of indoor dirt jumps, this is the first facility that aims to provide a whole spectrum of mountain bike terrain and disciplines. It is aimed both to improve skills and introduce riders to new disciplines in a safer environment as well as providing riding facilities during the winter. It is unique in that different riding styles are found in proximity to each other. Its initial success has attracted interest from the industry with companies keen to sponsor new areas and events. Having proven to the industry that this format works, it may act as a template by which other examples may follow around the world. The Milwaukee location, formerly a Menards, opened December 31, 2010, largely due to funding by Trek.

== Rooms ==
Every year, Ray's revamps its trails. Replacing aging features with new structures or simply redirecting traffic to approach lines from a new perspective. They currently have a full-size indoor pumptrack, dedicated jump trail, foam pits, and a BMX pool. There is also a "natural” section that consists of rocks and logs that make up the jumps and skinnies in the area.

== Locations ==
- Cleveland: 41°27′18″N 81°45′09″W
