= Hopkins, Cleveland =

Neighborhood of Cleveland, Ohio, United States

Coordinates: 41°25′23″N 81°50′28″W

Hopkins
- Neighborhood of Cleveland
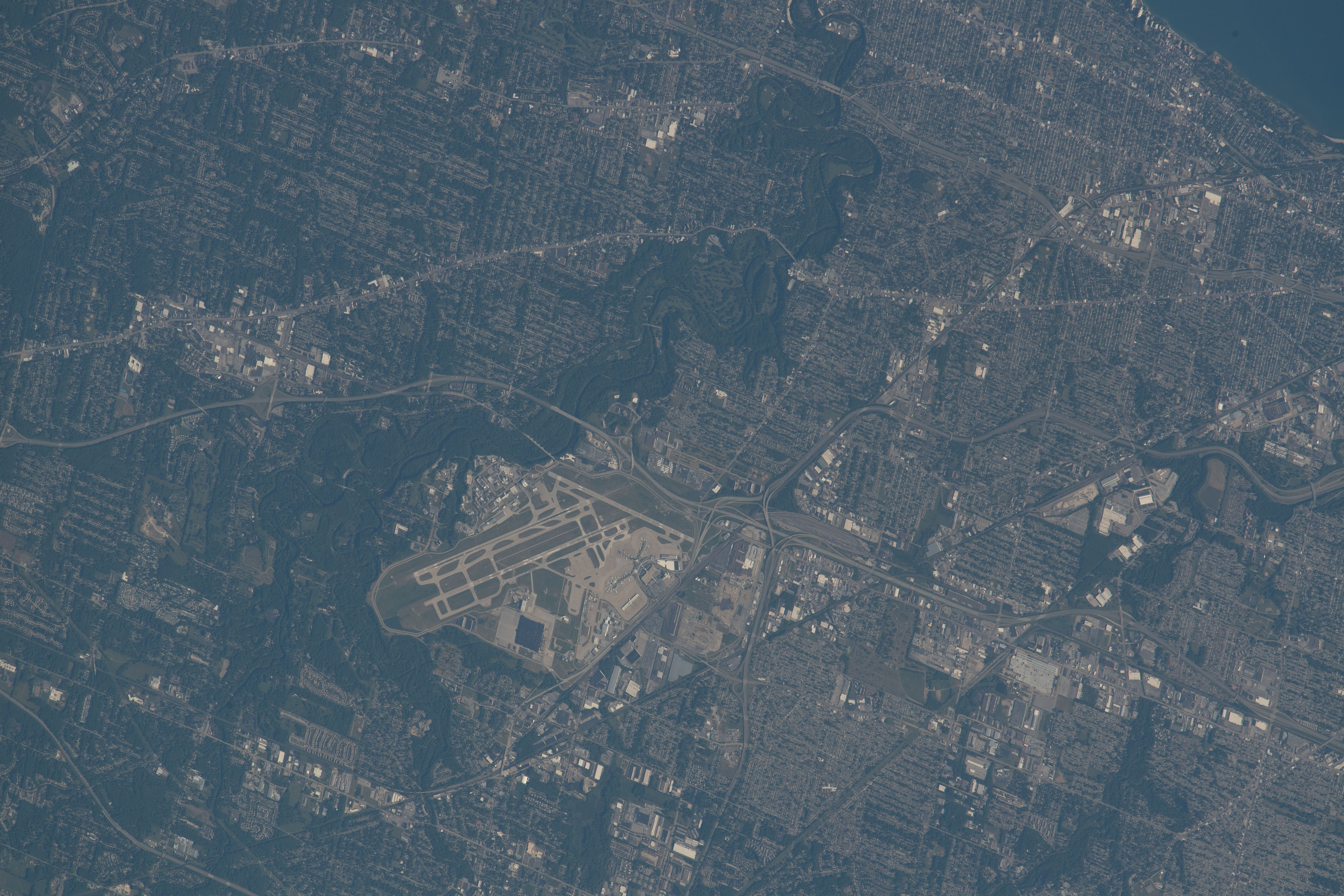
- Satellite photo of the Hopkins neighborhood from the International Space Station, July 2022

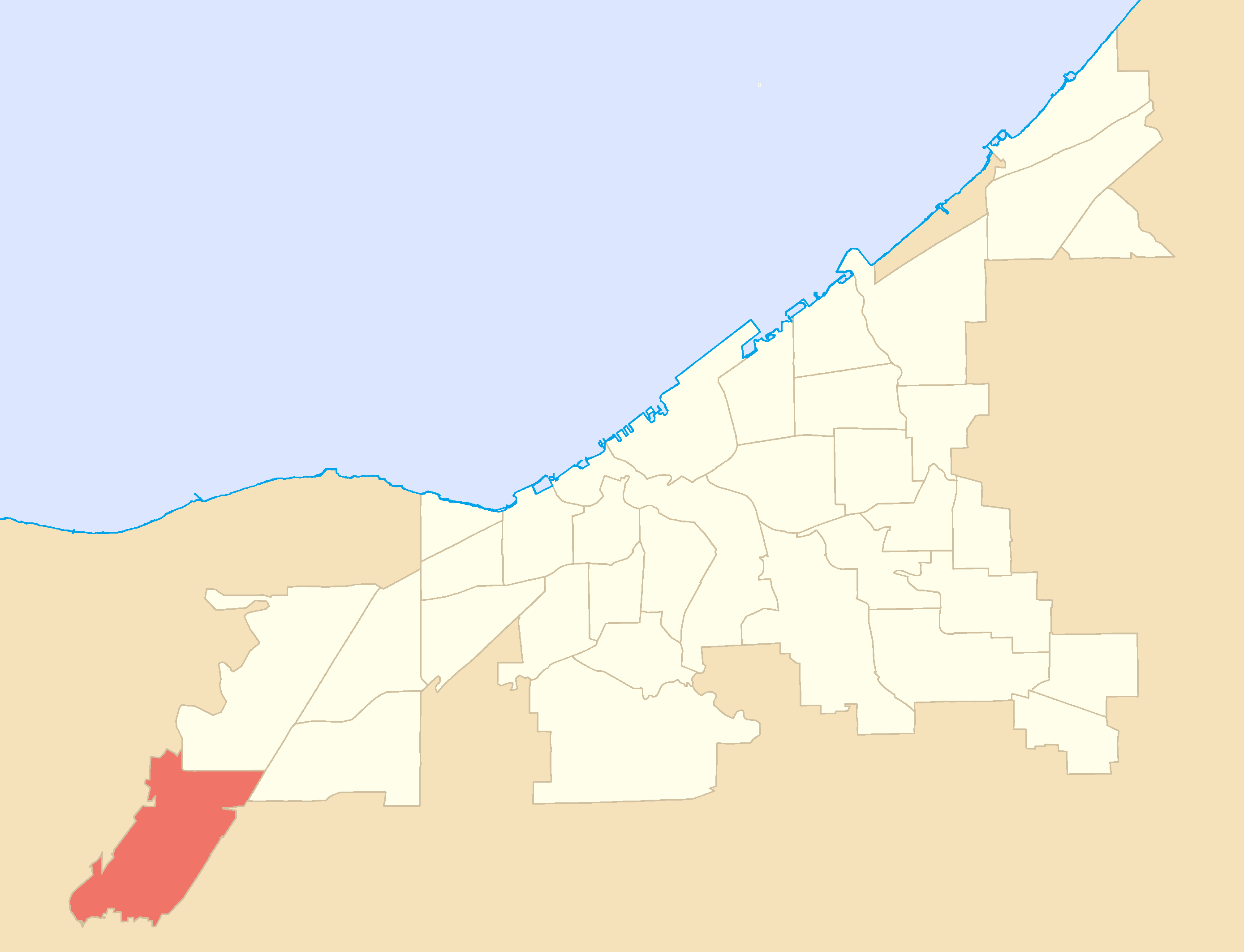
- Country: United States
- State: Ohio
- County: Cuyahoga County
- City: Cleveland

Population (2020)
  - Total: 312

Demographics
  - White: 58.9%
  - Black: 29.9%
  - Hispanic (of any race): 16.1%
  - Asian and Pacific Islander: 5.5%
  - Mixed and Other: 5.7%
- Time zone: UTC-5 (EST)
  - Summer (DST): UTC-4 (EDT)
- Area code: 216
- Median income: $40,317
- Source: 2020 U.S. Census

Hopkins is a neighborhood on the West Side of Cleveland, Ohio. Known as Riverside until 2014, it borders the neighborhoods of Kamm's Corners and Bellaire–Puritas to the north and northeast, the suburb of Fairview Park to the northwest, and Brook Park to the south, east, and west. Most of the area of Hopkins is covered by Cleveland Hopkins International Airport. Consequently, the neighborhood has "one of Cleveland's lowest population levels as well as the lowest level of population density."

== History ==
Hopkins became part of Cleveland in 1923, after the annexation of the former municipality of West Park. It is one of four sub-neighborhoods that comprise the larger historical West Park area, the others being Kamm's Corners, Bellaire–Puritas, and Jefferson. The major milestone for the neighborhood was the completion of Cleveland Hopkins International Airport in 1925, during the tenure of city manager (mayor) William R. Hopkins. In 1942, the NASA Glenn Research Center (then named Aircraft Engine Research Laboratory) also opened.
