= Cleveland Subdivision =

Railway line in Ohio, U.S.

- Map

Overview
- Status: Active
- Owner: CSX
- Locale: Northeast Ohio

Service
- Type: Freight rail
- Operator(s): CSX

Technical
- Number of tracks: 1
- Track gauge: 4 ft 8 1/2 in (1,435 mm) standard gauge

The Cleveland Subdivision is a railroad line owned and operated by CSX Transportation in the U.S. state of Ohio. The line runs from a junction with the CL&W Subdivision at Lester northeast across the Short Line Subdivision near Brook Park to a terminus near Brooklyn along a former Baltimore and Ohio Railroad line.
