= Cleveland Terminal Subdivision =

Railway line in Ohio

Coordinates: 41°28′39.8″N 81°40′30.1″W

- Map

Overview
- Status: Active
- Owner: CSX
- Locale: Cleveland

Service
- Type: Local freight, Inter-city rail
- System: CSX Transportation
- Operator(s): CSX, Amtrak

Technical
- Number of tracks: 2
- Track gauge: 4 ft 8 1/2 in (1,435 mm) standard gauge

The Cleveland Terminal Subdivision is a railroad line owned by CSX Transportation in the U.S. state of Ohio. The line runs from a point northeast of downtown Cleveland southwest to downtown along the former New York Central Railroad main line.

At its east end, known as CP-175 by CSX Transportation, the Cleveland Terminal Subdivision and the Short Line Subdivision come together and become the Erie West Subdivision. Through freights diverge at this location onto the Short Line Subdivision to bypass downtown Cleveland. The west end of the Cleveland Terminal Subdivision is at a junction with the Norfolk Southern Railway's Cleveland Line and Chicago Line, a point called CP-181 by the railroad.

The Cleveland Terminal Subdivision is principally used by Amtrak's Lake Shore Limited to access Cleveland Lakefront Station, however local freights and coal trains occasionally use the line as well. Though downgraded and single-tracked, the Cleveland Terminal Subdivision still has its Traffic Control System in place. The line is dispatched from CSX's "G" desk at their dispatching office in Indianapolis, Indiana.

== History ==
The line was built by the Cleveland, Painesville and Ashtabula Railroad and opened in 1851. Through mergers, leases, and takeovers, it became part of the Lake Shore and Michigan Southern Railway, New York Central Railroad, Penn Central and Conrail. When Conrail was broken up in 1999, the main line east of downtown Cleveland, including the Cleveland Terminal Subdivision, was assigned to CSX.
