= West Park, Cleveland =

Historical area of Cleveland, Ohio, United States

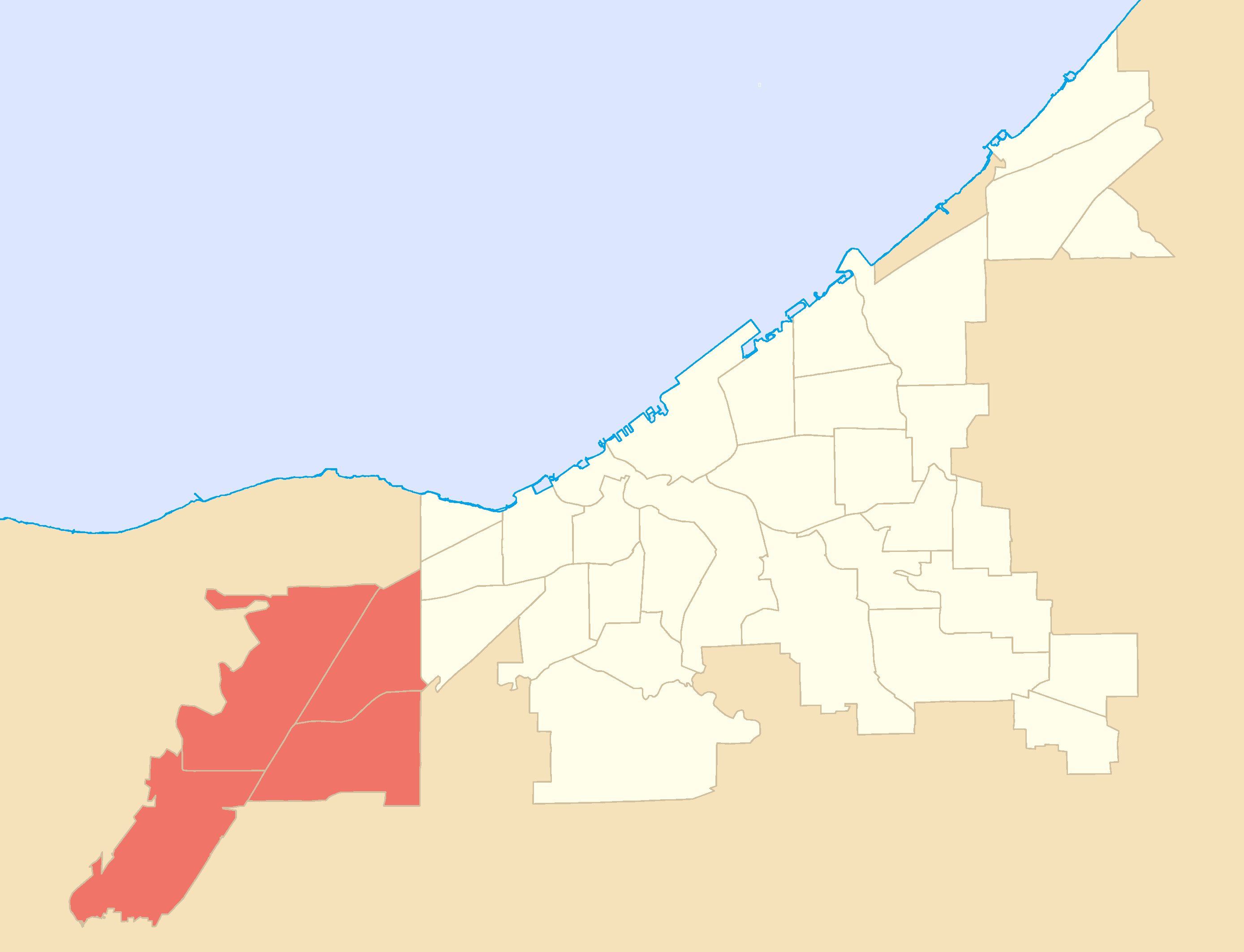
Map of the West Park historical area, comprising the neighborhoods of Jefferson, Kamm's Corners, Bellaire–Puritas, and Hopkins.

West Park is a historical area on the West Side of Cleveland, Ohio. Once an independent municipality, it was annexed by Cleveland after a referendum in 1923. The area covers 12.5 square miles and is bounded by West 117th Street to the east, the Rocky River Valley to the west, Brookpark Road to the South, and the streetcar suburb of Lakewood to the north. The Cleveland City Planning Commission traditionally divides West Park into four neighborhoods: Jefferson, Kamm's Corners, Bellaire–Puritas, and Hopkins.

== History ==
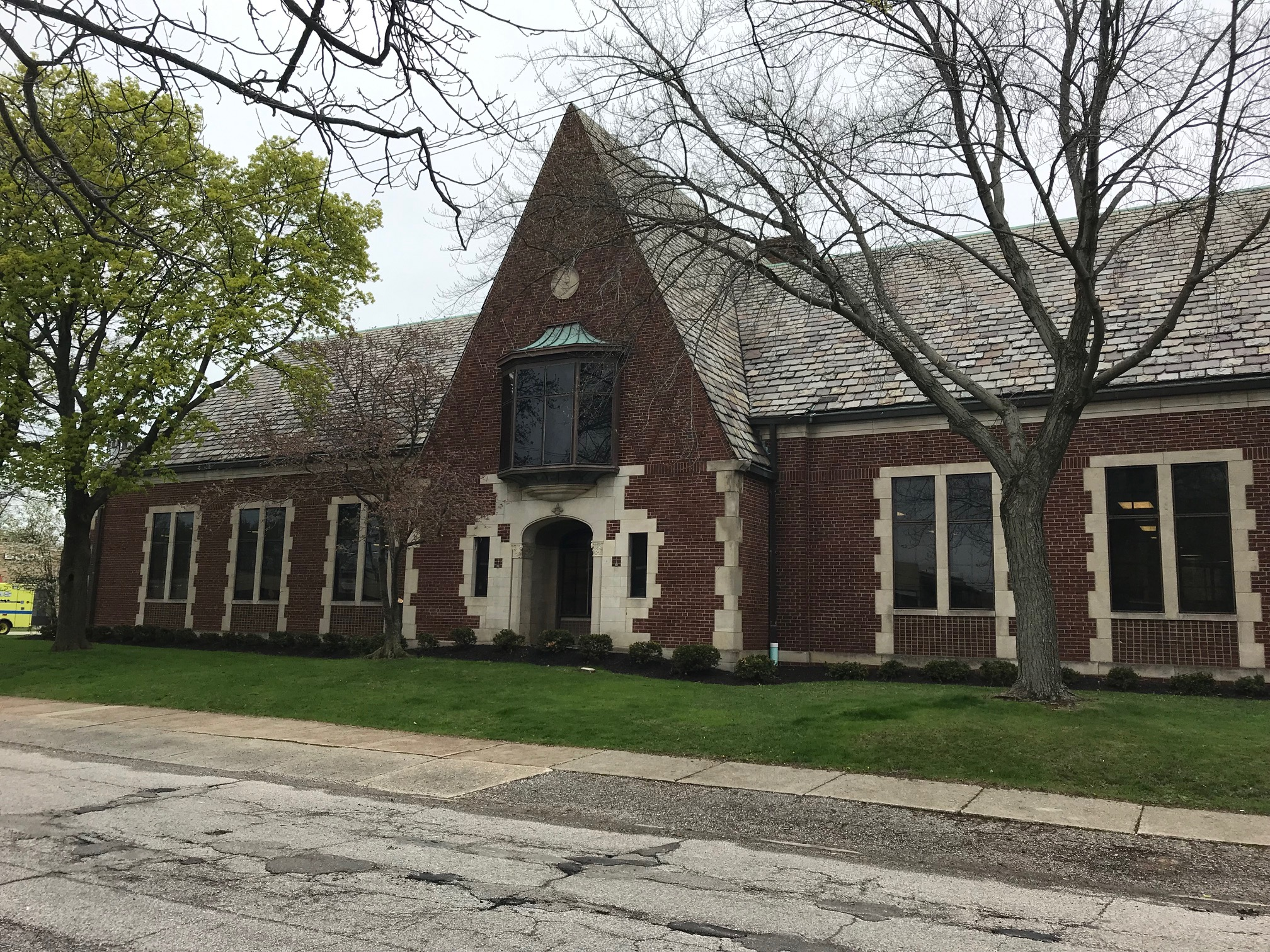
Cleveland Public Library – West Park Branch

Up until the 1600s, the area of West Park had no name. West Park was part of the vast, forest-covered wilderness that once blanketed most of the eastern half of the present United States and it followed the pattern of settlement from Native American civilizations to migration from eastern colonists. In 1796, the Connecticut Land Company sent an expedition, led by General Moses Cleaveland, to explore and survey their new holdings in the Connecticut Western Reserve. Cleaveland landed at the mouth of the Cuyahoga River in July and founded Cleveland, Ohio.

=== Rockport Township ===
In 1810 Cuyahoga County was formally organized with Cleveland as the county seat. At this time the site of future West Park, seven miles west of Cleveland, was in a region officially known only as Township 7, Range 14 of the Western Reserve. In 1812, Nathan Alger, with his wife and sons, Henry, Herman, Nathan Jr., and Thaddeus P., and his son-in-law, John Kidney, all from Litchfield County, Connecticut, settled upon sections twelve and thirteen in the township and founded Alger settlement. Two days later, Benjamin Robinson, afterward son-in-law of Nathan Alger, came from Vermont and also settled in that area. Nathan Alger Sr. died January 21, 1813, the first white person who died in the township.

In 1819, the eighteen families living in the area decided to adopt a more proper name than just being referred to as Township 7, Range 14. They chose "Rockport Township," inspired by the high rocky embankments along the lake and both sides of Rocky River. Using present-day landmarks, it was bounded by Lake Erie on the north, West 117th on the east, Brookpark Road on the south and West 230th, in the present City of Fairview Park on the west. As the population of the 15,207-acre township grew, hamlets and villages were formed, eventually leading to the establishment of surrounding Lakewood, Rocky River and Fairview Village (Fairview Park).

In 1892, Rockport Hamlet (future West Park) was formed within Rockport Township, bounded by the Rocky River on the west, West 117th street on the east and Brookpark Road on the south. On January 31, 1900, Rockport Hamlet petitioned the county to form its own co-existent township with Rockport Township. On March 7, 1900, the request was granted and a new Township of West Park was created. In 1902 the Rockport Hamlet was incorporated as Rockport Village within West Park Township. Finally, on February 1, 1913, Rockport Village changed its name and became the Village of West Park. In February 1921 it officially became West Park City with a population of 5,000 residents.

=== Naming of West Park ===
The name West Park was named after one of its early settlers, John M. West. West was born in 1811 in County Leitrim, Ireland. He immigrated to America with his parents in 1826. In the 1840s he married Frances O'Brien who was born in County Roscommon, Ireland.

In about 1842, John West bought a 600-acre farm in Rockport Township, situated along the south side of Lorain Avenue and extending roughly from present West 137th to West 143rd Streets. As of 2014, the red brick home he built still stands at 3684 West 138th Street. John and Frances West had a family of eight children in the house, raising six of them to adulthood. The West Farm included a 25-acre "front yard" and an artificial lake complete with rowboats. This park-like wooded preserve, located at present West 138th Street and Lorain Avenue, came to be called "West Park." Thus, John M. West is not the founder of West Park nor its first settler, but he did create the estate from which the city of West Park took its name.

== City of West Park ==
West Park existed as a separate municipality for approximately nine years and eight months but during that brief period it was a fully functioning city. It had a two-story brick city hall on Lorain Avenue near West 157th Street which housed the mayor's office, all city departments, and police headquarters. The West Park police department consisted of a chief, two sergeants and 12 officers. The fire department boasted two fire stations, a chief, a captain, three lieutenants, 20 men, and a motorized fire engine. West Park also claimed a well-developed public school system with nine schools, one of them a high school with 300 students (the old John Marshall High School at the corner of W. 152nd and Lorain Avenue) and 2,650 pupils and 94 teachers overall. The city's total property evaluation in 1922 was $27,000,000.

=== Annexation to Cleveland ===
In the early 1920s, a campaign began to annex West Park to the city of Cleveland, its immediate neighbor to the east. Miss Carrie Norton, stated, "Annexation is inevitable, and the logical moment has arrived." Cleveland was then the fifth largest city in the country, having annexed many of the smaller communities around it. Over the years, the citizens of Newburgh, South Brooklyn and Collinwood, among others, voted to merge with the City of Cleveland. By 1922, Cleveland wanted to add West Park to the list. The majority of people in West Park liked the idea. Mayor George C. Reitz stated he'd no longer be mayor of West Park, but "I'm going to be a resident of Cleveland." Some of the issues that persuaded West Parkers to want to become a part of the city of Cleveland was Cleveland's promise to lower taxes and public transportation fares, update utilities and infrastructure, as well as offer a better safety force and lower-cost schools. The tax rate in West Park was $2.78 while Cleveland's rate was $2.49. Cleveland pledged to provide West Park with street car service for a $.05 compared to the current fare of $.07 ½ and cut water bills in half. Cleveland also claimed to provide a superior school system for a lower cost per pupil. They also promised better police protection, more paved streets, better lighting, and increased public service. In spite of all the claims, street car service was the main issue in the annexation battle.

The matter came to a vote on November 7, 1922. Annexation won by a vote of 2,011 to 1,077. West Park became Cleveland's new ward 33. The public property and services were taken over by Cleveland, and West Park became a part of Cleveland on January 1, 1923. West Park was the last independent city to be annexed by Cleveland.

== West Park in the 21st Century ==
West Park in the 21st century is more defined as west of W. 130th Street to the Metroparks and the Rocky River Valley. It seems more suburban than urban, with trim brick bungalows and Tudors, and thriving retail areas. There is a collection of mostly Irish-oriented bars and restaurants near Kamm's Corners.

In 2019, the Cleveland Public Library appointed an architectural team to renovate and build an addition on the system’s West Park Branch Library, as part of a 10-year, $100 million plan to update 27 branches throughout the city. The project, funded by a tax increase in 2017, which won by a near 70% margin, should be completed by 2029 when the system will invest an additional $65 million into renovations of the Main Library in downtown Cleveland.

The neighborhood has been the site for the “Hooley,” an outdoor, family-oriented party that features Irish dance, music, food and drink. Celebrating its 10th anniversary in 2019, the Hooley (Irish for a “lively gathering”) is traditionally opened either by the Cleveland Police Pipe and Drums or the Cleveland Firefighters Memorial Pipe and Drums. Local politicians, jazz and rock bands, and children's programs complete the day.

West Park also celebrates the annual Greek Festival, a three-day event with live Greek music, dancing and Greek food, served in tents set up in the neighborhood. Sponsored by the George Varouh Cretan Club of Cleveland, the clubhouse is also available to event-goers.
