= Mallet Creek (Ohio) =

Coordinates: 41°12′55″N 81°54′35″W

Mallet Creek is a stream located entirely within Medina County, Ohio. The 11.4-mile (18.3 km) long stream is a tributary of the West Branch Rocky River.

Mallet Creek was named for Dan Mallet, the first pioneer who settled there.

== See also ==
- List of rivers of Ohio
