= Sterling, Ohio =

- CDP
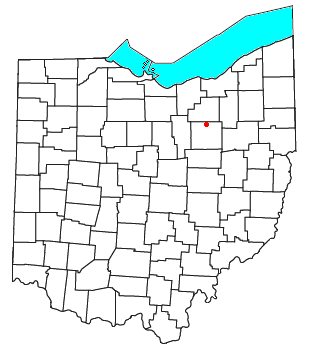
- Location of Sterling, Ohio
- Coordinates: 40°57′58″N 81°50′38″W
- Country: United States
- State: Ohio
- County: Wayne
- Township: Milton
- Elevation: 968 ft (295 m)

Population (2020)
  - Total: 432
- Time zone: UTC-5 (Eastern (EST))
  - Summer (DST): UTC-4 (EDT)
- ZIP code: 44276
- GNIS feature ID: 2628971

Sterling is an unincorporated, census-designated place in northwestern Milton Township, Wayne County, Ohio, United States with the ZIP code of 44276. The population was 432 at the 2020 census.

== History ==
Sterling was platted in 1880.
