= Bellaire–Puritas, Cleveland =

Neighborhood of Cleveland, Ohio, United States

Coordinates: 41°26′1.2546″N 081°48′0.5034″W

Bellaire–Puritas
- Neighborhood of Cleveland
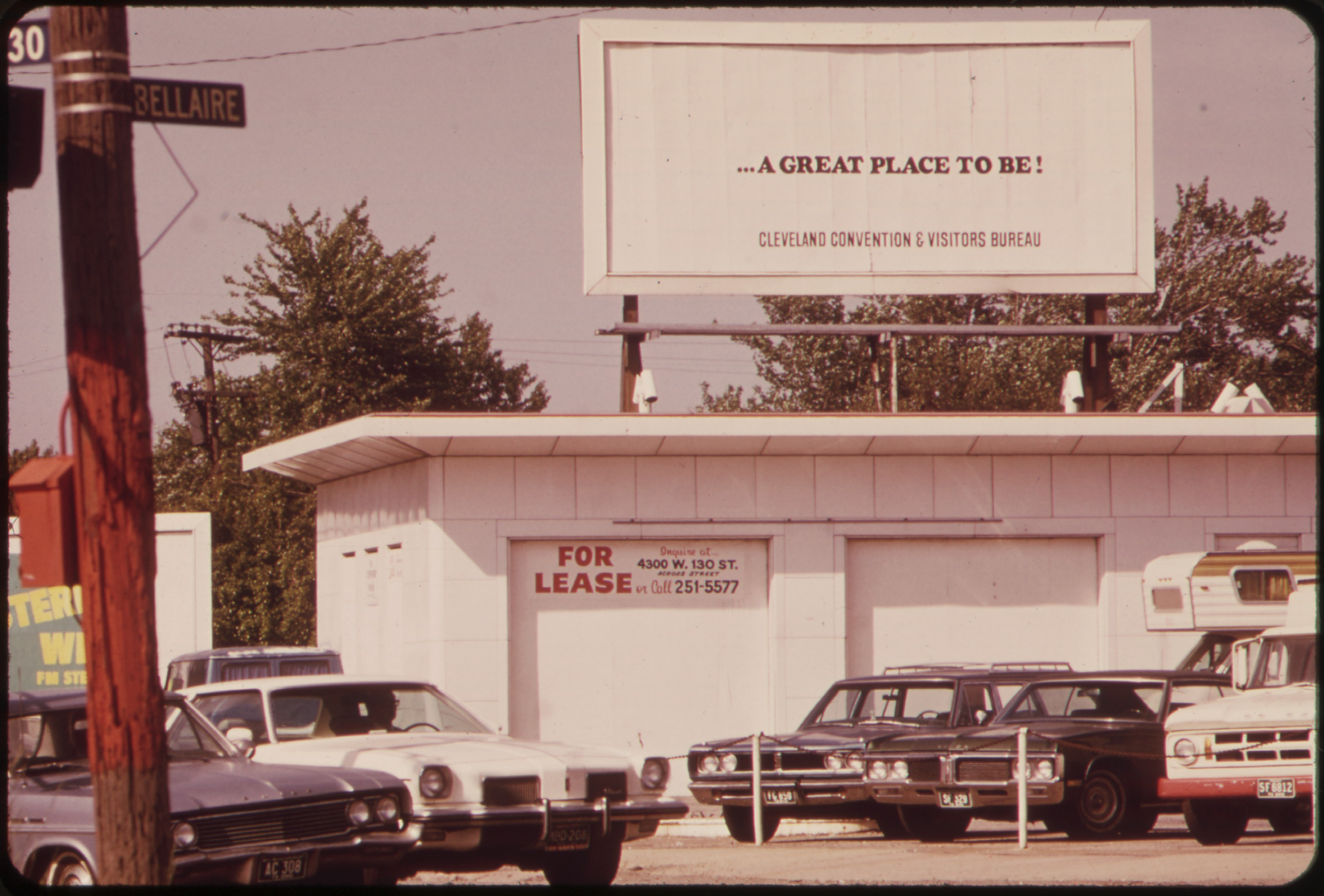
- A business at W. 130th and Bellaire Road in 1973

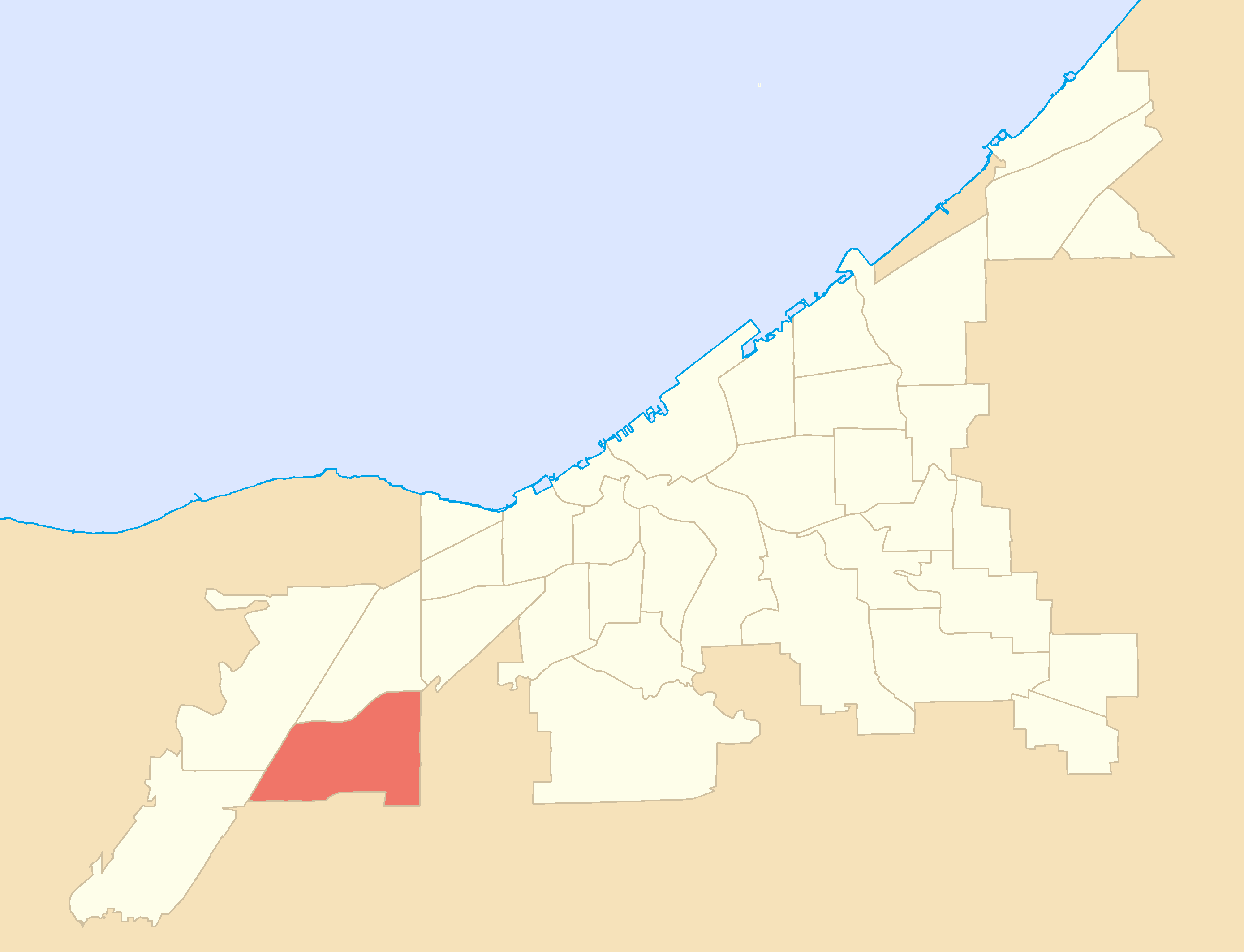
- Country: United States
- State: Ohio
- County: Cuyahoga County
- City: Cleveland

Population (2020)
  - Total: 14,210

Demographics
  - White: 57.2%
  - Black: 26.5%
  - Hispanic (of any race): 16.7%
  - Asian and Pacific Islander: 3.2%
  - Mixed and Other: 13.1%
- Time zone: UTC-5 (EST)
  - Summer (DST): UTC-4 (EDT)
- ZIP Codes: 44111, 44130, 44135, 44142
- Area code: 216
- Median income: $32,825
- Source: 2020 U.S. Census

Bellaire–Puritas is a neighborhood on the West Side of Cleveland, Ohio, in the United States. Originally part of the Village of West Park, it was annexed by the city in 1923. Formerly known as Puritas–Longmead, the neighborhood takes its name from the two streets which form its northern boundary: Puritas Avenue and Bellaire Road.

== History ==
The area which became Bellaire–Puritas was initially organized as part of Rockport Township in 1819. It remained a highly rural, thinly-populated area until the end of the 1800s, when the Linndale development began to be built. In 1900, Cuyahoga County created West Park Township from what remained of Rockport Township. Transportation in West Park was limited to a few rutted dirt roads, which led to the area's nickname as the "lost city." West Park agreed to be annexed by the city of Cleveland in 1923.

== Boundaries ==
The Chicago Line of the Norfolk Southern Railway (NS) (completed in 1851) forms the western boundary of the neighborhood. The NS' Rockport Yard, CSX Transportation railroad tracks (completed in 1910), and Interstate 480 (opened in 1987) form the neighborhood's southern boundary, and CSX tracks (constructed in 1851) largely define its eastern boundary. Another set of NS tracks run diagonally southwest-to-northeast, cutting the neighborhood roughly in half. Interstate 71 forms the area's western boundary. These highways and railroad tracks leave the neighborhood relatively cut off from surrounding neighborhoods and cities, and break the neighborhood into two distinct residential districts.

The Chevy Branch of Big Creek drains much of the northeast and east sections of the neighborhood.

== Economy ==
More than 20 percent of Cleveland's industrial activity occurs within the Bellaire–Puritas neighborhood. A large number of industrial parks exist along I-480 and the NS and CSX railroad tracks in the southern part of the neighborhood. This is the heaviest concentration of industrial parks in the city of Cleveland. Manufacturing is the predominant economic activity in Bellaire–Puritas, followed by employment in the education, healthcare, and social welfare assistance fields. The main retail corridors in the area are on Puritas Avenue between W. 156th and Bellaire Road, and on W. 130th between Bellaire Road and Sprecher Avenue.

== Housing and residents ==
Most of the housing in the neighborhood dates from the period immediately after World War II. Houses were built first in the neighborhood's eastern section, with development moving west. Single-family homes are generally small, under 1,500 square feet (140 m^{2}). Much of this housing stock is deteriorating, even though residents of Bellaire–Puritas have a median household income of $32,900 (20 percent higher than that of Cleveland as a whole). Residents in the neighborhood have relatively low levels of education, with just 14 percent of citizens having an associate degree or better.

Almost 30 percent of all Bellaire–Puritas residents depend on Social Security as their sole source of income.

== Attractions ==
Gilmore Park is a nearly 6-acre (2.41 ha) park located at W. 134th & Puritas Av. It offers a baseball field and two basketball courts, as well as a children's play structure with rubberized Terrasoft play surface. It was established in 1956.

Crossburn Park is a 5.28 acres (2.14 ha) park located between Sprecher and Crossburn Av., west of W. 130th St. It offers a baseball field, a basketball court, two tennis courts, a children's play structure and a splash pad.

Ralph Schumitsh Park is a 3.66 acres (1.48 ha) park located at McGowan Av. & W. 124th St. It offers two baseball fields and a children's play structure.

Puritas Park Shopping Plaza on Puritas Avenue includes two discount stores, a pharmacy, daycare, jewelry store, cigarette store, restaurant, a nail salon, a hair salon, and a US Post Office.

== Bibliography ==
- Bellaire–Puritas Development Corporation (October 2009). The Bellaire–Puritas Neighborhood Plan (PDF) (Report). Cleveland, Ohio.
- Camp, Mark J. (2007). Railroad Depots of Northeast Ohio. Charleston, S.C.: Arcadia Publishing. ISBN 9780738551159.
- Cleveland City Planning Commission (January 15, 2014). Bellaire–Puritas (PDF) (Report). Cleveland, Ohio.
- Poor, Henry V. (1915). Poor's Manual of the Railroads of the United States, 1915. New York: Poor's Railroad Manual Co. pp. 57 v. hdl:2027/mdp.39015039344240.
