= Hubbell & Benes =

American architectural firm

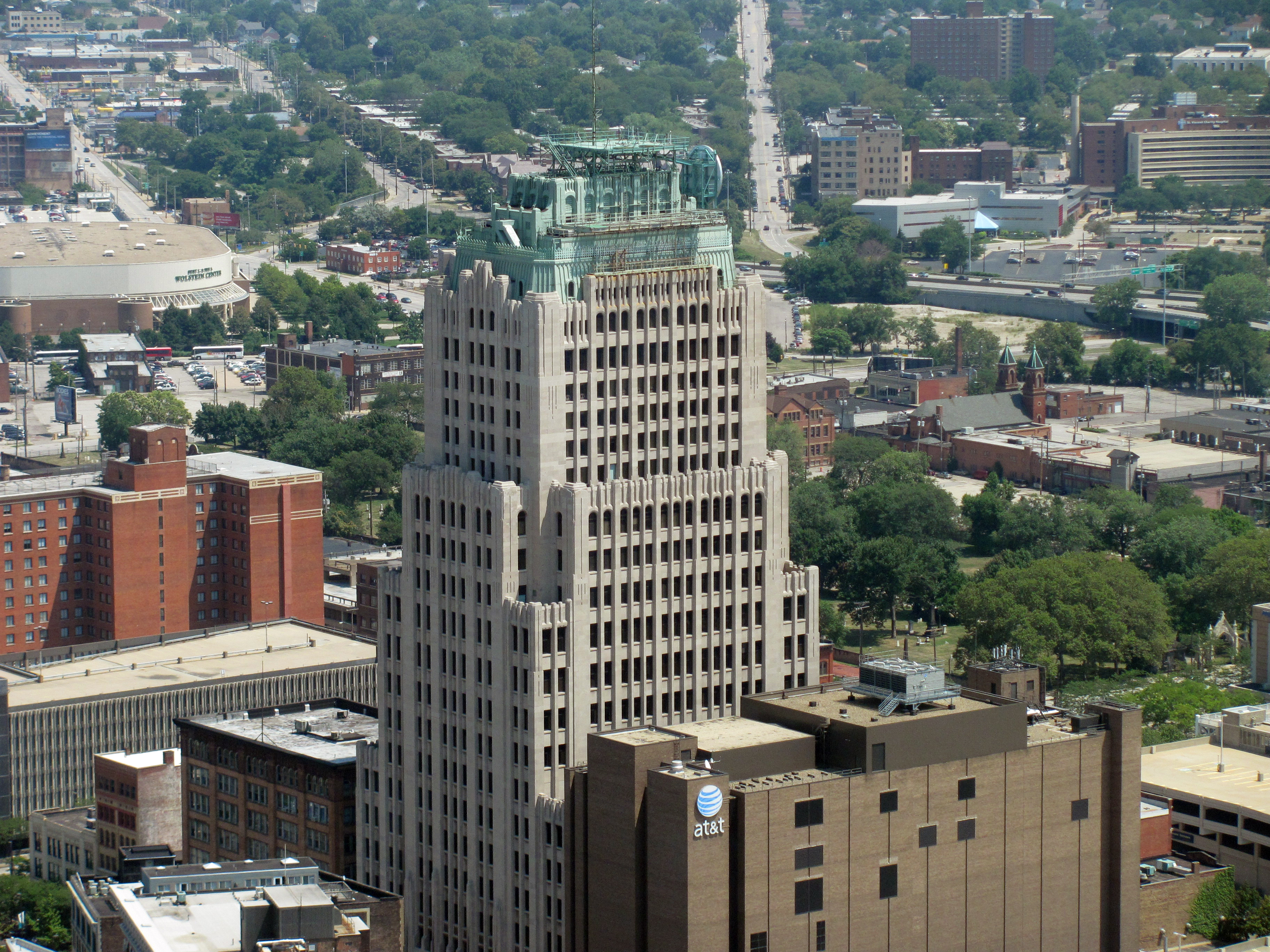
Ohio Bell Telephone Co. building as seen from the Terminal Tower observation deck

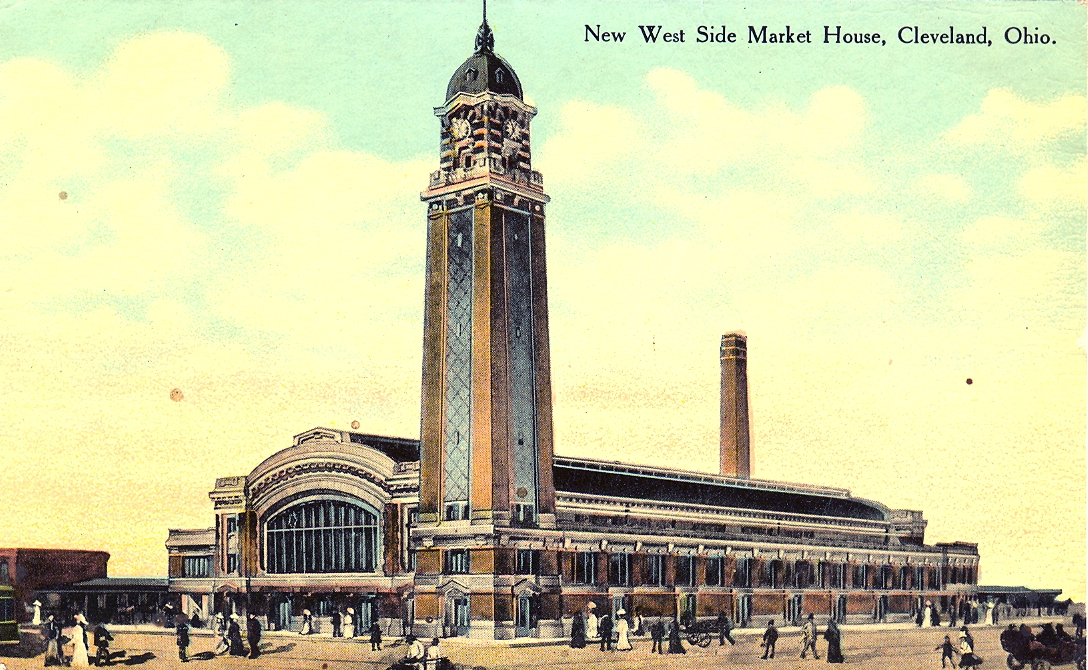
Circa 1912 postcard of the West Side Market

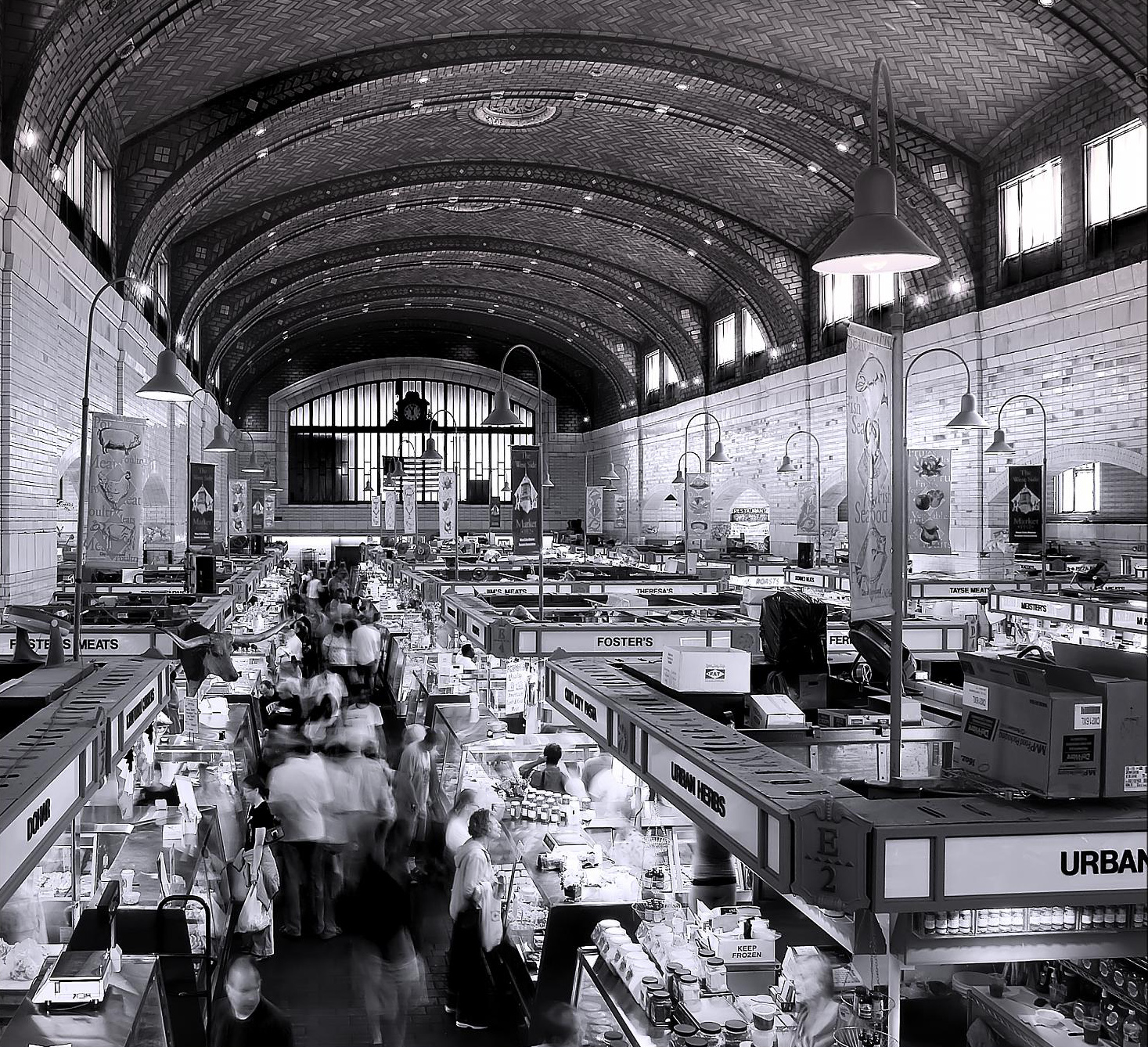
West Side Market interior

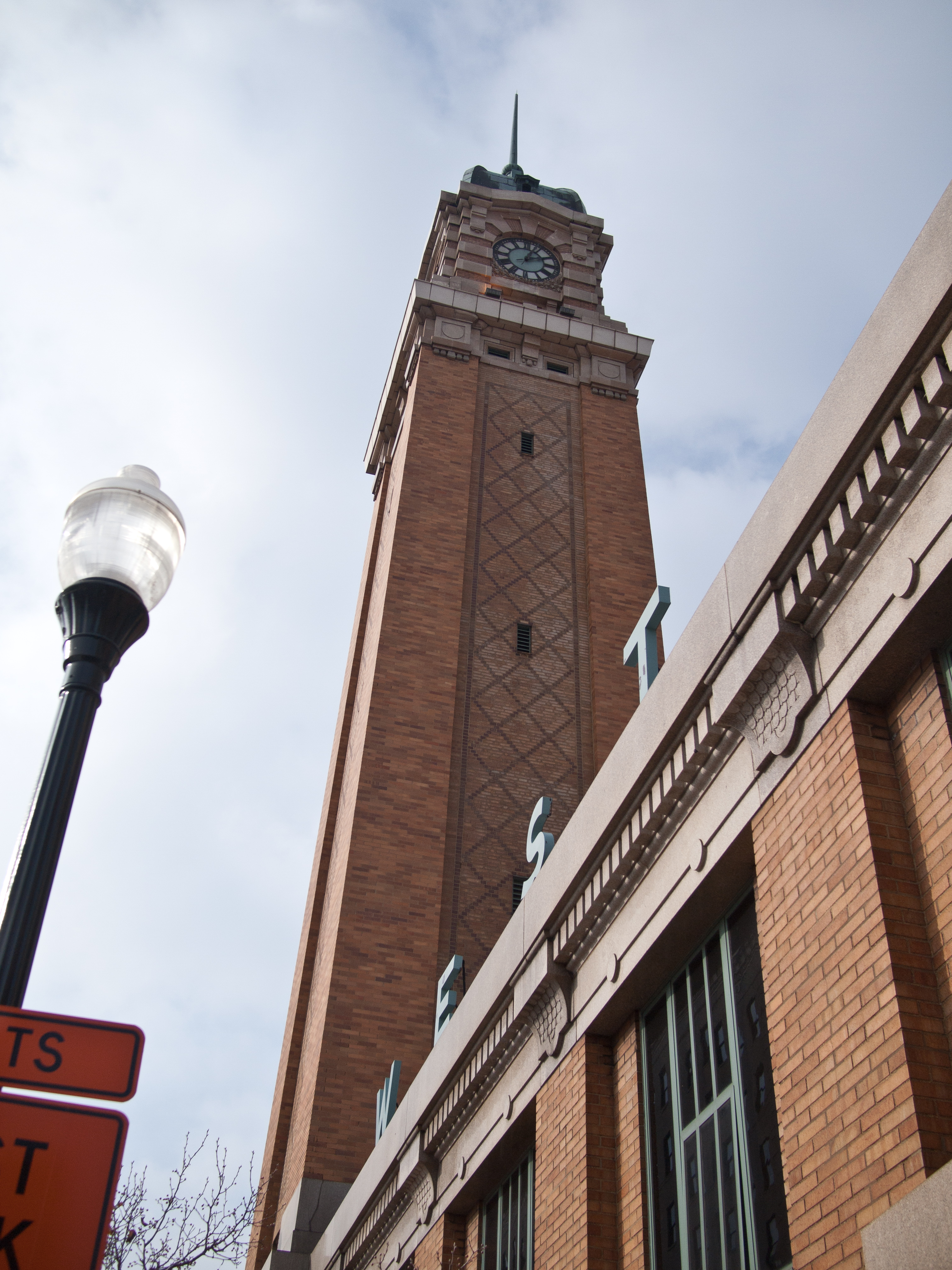
Market's tower

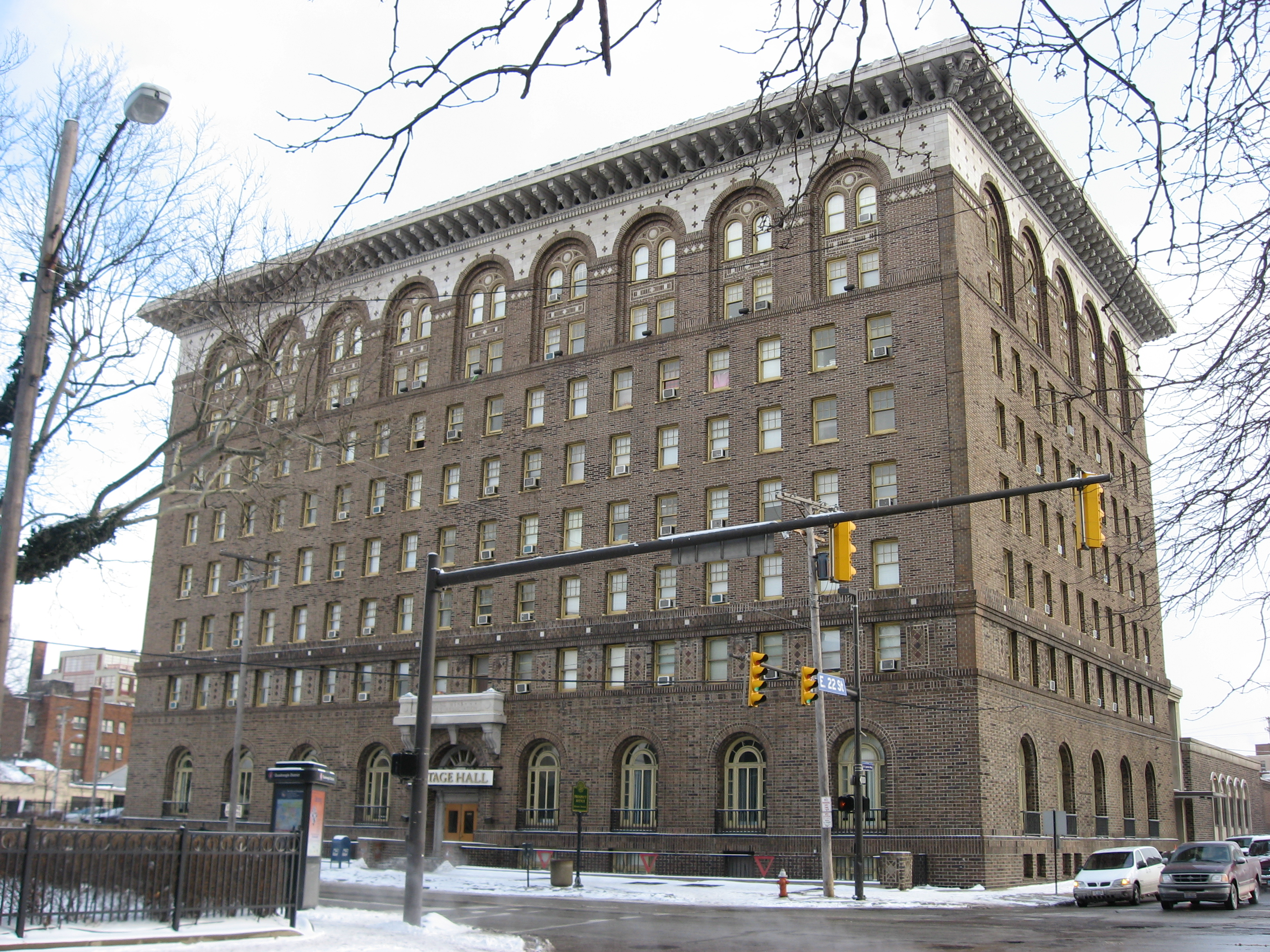
Central YMCA in Cleveland

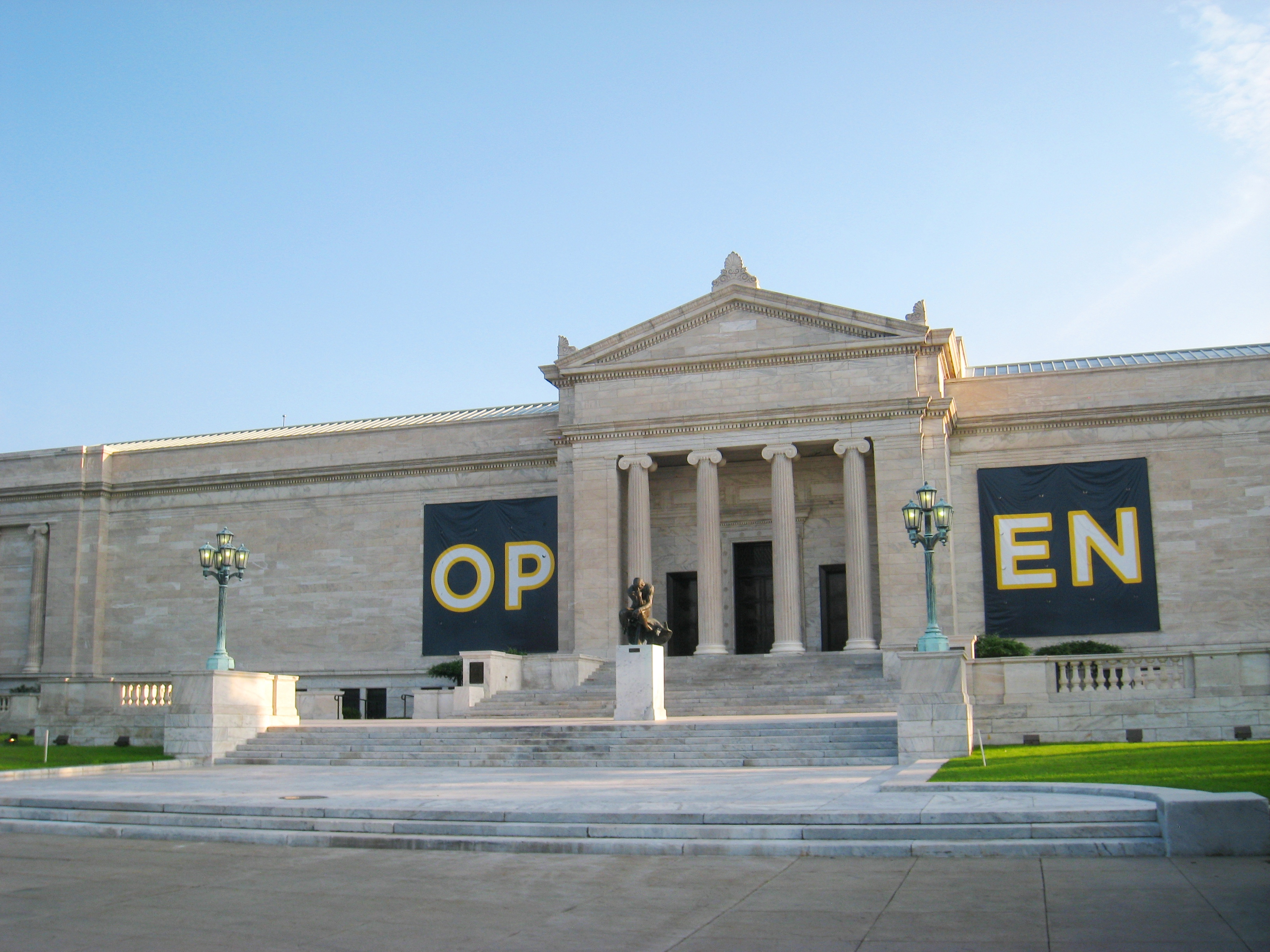
Older wing of the Cleveland Museum of Art

Hubbell & Benes was a prominent Cleveland, Ohio architectural firm formed by Benjamin Hubbell (July 11, 1867 – February 21, 1953) and W. Dominick Benes (June 14, 1857 – May 15, 1935) in 1897 after the pair departed from Coburn, Barnum, Benes & Hubbell. Their work included commercial and residential buildings as well as telephone exchange buildings, the West Side Market and Cleveland Museum of Art. Before teaming up, they worked for Coburn and Barnum. Benes was Jeptha Wade’s personal architect and designed numerous public buildings, commercial buildings, and residences for him including the Wade Memorial Chapel.

Hubbell retired in 1927, but the firm continued and outlived both its original partners. In 1960, it was known as Hubbell, Benes & Hoff, with Benjamin Hubbell's son Benjamin S. Hubbell (1897–1988) the senior partner. Many of the firm's drawings are collected at the Western Reserve Historical Society. They designed the Plain Dealer building, also used by the Cleveland Public Library as well as the Ohio Bell Telephone Co. building, an important early Cleveland with modern architecture and Art Deco features. The firm was also known for its designs in Classical Revival architecture.

A number of their works are listed on the U.S. National Register of Historic Places.

== Works ==
Works include (with attribution):

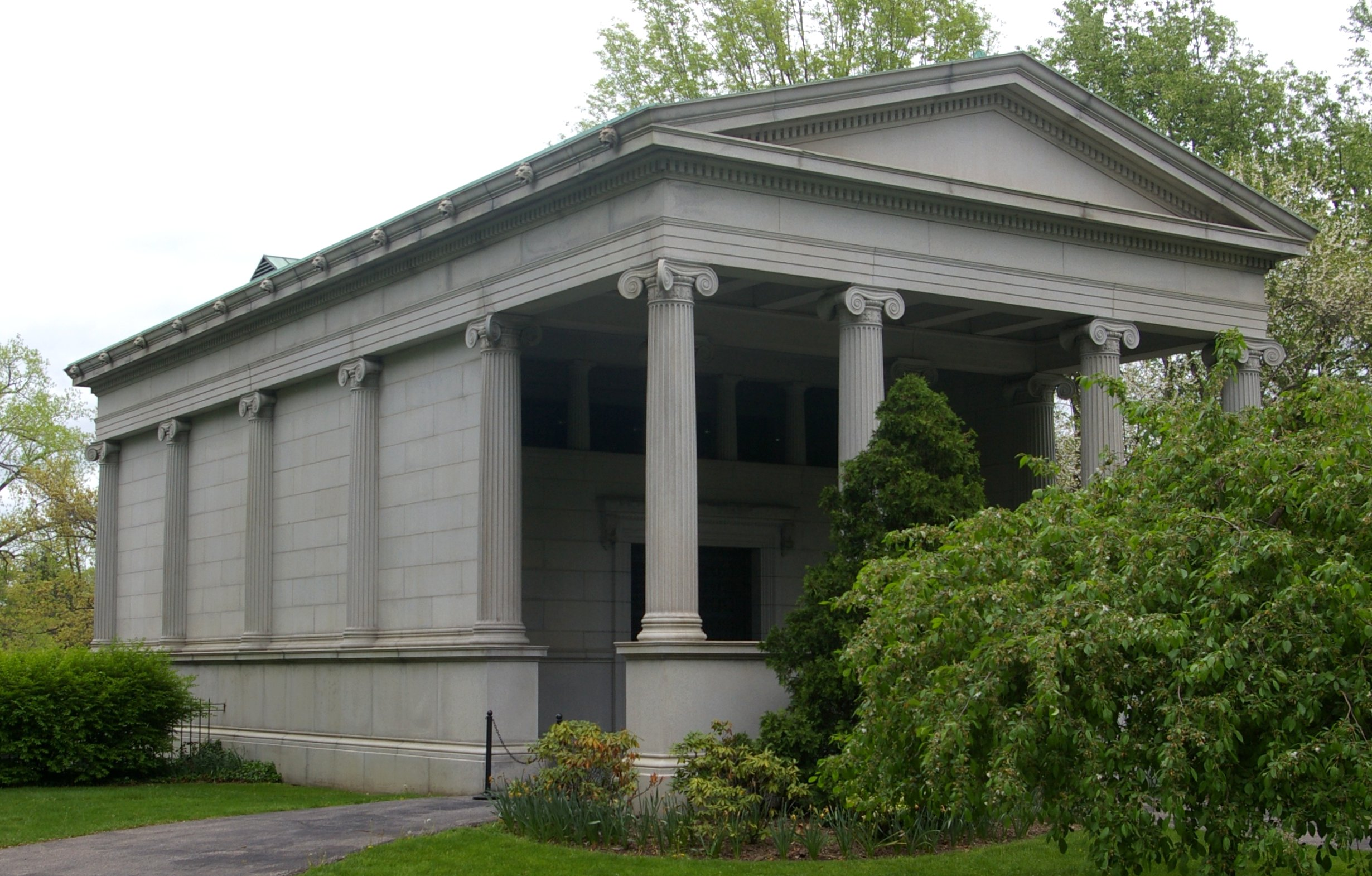
Wade Memorial Chapel was the firm's first commission. Its interior was decorated by Louis Comfort Tiffany and it is listed on the National Register

- Wade Memorial Chapel (1901) at 12316 Euclid Avenue in Lake View Cemetery, Cleveland, NRHP-listed
- Citizens Building (1903), now known as the City Club Building
- Cleveland School of Art (1905) at 1641 Magnolia Drive. Since demolished
- Mather College Gymnasium (1908) at 11120 Bellflower Road . Part of Flora Stone Mather College?
- West Side Market (1912), 1979 West 25th Street, Cleveland, (Hubbell & Benes), NRHP-listed as well as designs for neighboring structures that were never built
- Central YMCA (1912) 2200 Prospect Avenue, Cleveland, (Hubbell & Benes), NRHP-listed
- W.S. Tyler Office Building (1913) at 3601-5 Superior Avenue
- Original Illuminating Building (1915) at 75 Public Square, headquarters of the Cleveland Electric Illuminating Company until 1958 when the business relocated to a new Illuminating Building nearby at 55 Public Square in 1958.
- Cleveland Museum of Art (1916) at 11150 East Boulevard
- Cultural buildings around the Wade Park Oval (1916)
- Cleveland Masonic Temple (1921), 3615 Euclid Ave., Cleveland (Hubbell and Benes), NRHP-listed
- Plain Dealer building (1922) that was also used by the Cleveland Public Library at Superior and East 6th. Since demolished
- Pearl Street Savings and Trust (1923) at 4175 Pearl and Broadview
- Phyllis Wheatley Association building (1927), 4450 Cedar Ave., Cleveland (Hubbell & Benes), NRHP-listed
- St. Luke's Hospital (Cleveland) (1927) at 11311 Shaker Boulevard
- Ohio Bell Telephone Co. building (1927) at 750 Huron Road, now known as the AT&T Huron Road Building
- University Circle (early plans)
- Shaker Heights High School and its auditorium, renovated in 2008.
- St. Thomas Episcopal Church, 214 E. Second St. Port Clinton, OH (Coburn, Barnum, Benes & Hubbell), NRHP-listed
- One or more works in South Brooklyn Commercial District, roughly along Pearl and Broadview Rds. Cleveland, OH (Hubbell and Benes), NRHP-listed

== Other projects ==
- Residence for Arthur Odell (1892) at 1715 East 82nd Street. Demolished
- Residence for Arthur O'Dell (1898) at 1709 East 82nd Street. Demolished
- Residence for Atthur Odell (1898) at 1725 East 82nd Street. Demolished
- Cornell Alumni Hall (1899) Ithaca, New York
- Residence of W.B. White (1899)
- Residence for Benjamin Hubbell (1899) at 1672 East 117th Street. Demolished
- Millford Plantation (Thomasville, Georgia), Mill Pond Plantation, Arcadia Plantation (after being divided among the family) a recreational home site and residence for J.H. Wade and family 1903, 1905, 1910 Thomasville, Georgia, (Hubbell & Benes), NRHP-listed as Millpond Plantation
- H.E. Gresham Residence (1904)
- Fred C. Dorn Residence (1904)
- Stephen L. Peirce Residence (1904) at 17856 Lake Road in Lakewood, Ohio
- Benes Residence (1905) at 17881 Lake Avenue
- Hathaway Brown School (1905) at 1945 East 97th Street. Demolished
- Equity Savings and Loan (1905) at 5701 Euclid. Demolished
- Commercial block for Joseph Carabelli (1905) Demolished
- Commercial block for J.H. Wade (1905) Demolished
- Cleveland Telephone Co building (1906) at 5300 Prospect Avenue. Demolished
- East End School (1906) Demolished
- Cleveland School of Art -Art Studio Building (1907) Demolished
- Brayton Residence (1907) at 10803 Magnolia Drive. Demolished
- Wade Garretson Residence (1907) at 10804 Magnolia Drive. Demolished
- Cleveland Telephone Company Eddy Exchange (1907) at 12225 St. Clair Avenue
- Residence for J.H. Wade (1908) in Gates Mills, Ohio
- C.L. F. Weiber Residence (1908) at 12574 Lake Avenue in Lakewood, Ohio. Demolished
- Residence for J.H. Wade (1909) at 10831 Magnolia Drive
- Albert and Caleb Gowan Residence (1909) at 11120 Magnolia Drive. Demolished
- Residence of J.W. Wade (1910) in Gates Mills, Ohio
- Fries & Schele Department Store (addition and renovation) (1908 and 1912) at 1948 West 25th Street
- James C. Pettee Residence (1914) at 11610 Edgewater Drive. Demolished
- Cutler Office Building (1915). Demolished
- Cleveland Telephone Company Fairmount Exchange (1916) at 13174 Cedar Road in Cleveland Heights
- Hough Avenue Congregational Church (1917). Demolished
- T.B. Stauffer Residence (1917)
- Cleveland Telephone Company St. Clair Exchange (1920) at 12221 St. Clair Avenue
- National Malleable Castings building (1921) at 10600 Quincy Avenue. Demolished
- G.A. Kositzsky Cottage (1923)
- Carmi Thompson Residence (1923)
- G.C. King III Residence (1925)
- Dr Stoner Residence (1927)
- Carabelli Commercial Building
- Cleveland Builders Supply Stable and Warehouse Demolished
- Cliffside Office Building
- D.L. Cockley Residence
- East End Baptist Church Demolished
- East End School Association building Demolished
- Arthur M. Gordon Business Block
- Joshua Gregg Residence Demolished
- Gross and Riley Apartment Buildings
- Halcyon Flats
- Parmely Herrick Estate Demolished
- Joseph Hummell Apartment Building (Demolished)
- William H. Hunt Residence Demolished
- Laurel School Demolished
- J.P. Murphy Melrose Apartment
- National Malleable Castings building. Demolished
- New England Apartment Building. Demolished
- Ohio Bell Central Exchange in Massilon, Ohio
- Rosedale Office Building. Demolished
- F. A. Scott Residence
- F.G. Smith Residence
- Mrs. Taylor Apartment Building
- Taylor and Clinton Apartment Buildings
- J. H. Wade Farm Building in Mills, Ohio
- J.C. Wallace Residence
- Frank P. Whitton Apartment Building. Demolished
- Woodland Avenue Savings and Trust Demolished
- Jeptha Wade Estate, Valley Ridge Farm working buildings in Hunting Valley, Ohio
