= Hartness =

Hartness is a surname. Notable people with the surname include:

- Ann Hartness (born 1936), American academic research librarian
- Don Hartness (fl. 2020s), American politician from Mississippi
- Helen Hartness Flanders (1890–1972), American ballad collector
- Henry Hartness, English footballer
- James Hartness (1861–1934), American inventor, entrepreneur, and governor of Vermont
- Minnie Hartness (1867-1957), American stenographer, writer, lecturer

== See also ==
- Hartness State Airport, public airport near Springfield, Vermont
