= Coburn & Barnum =

American architect

Coburn & Barnum was a Cleveland, Ohio architectural firm from 1878 to 1897. It was established by Forrest A. Coburn (1848 – December 1, 1897) and Frank Seymour Barnum (November 25, 1850 – December 17, 1927). The firm also included W. Dominick Benes and Benjamin S. Hubbell for one year and was known as Coburn, Barnum, Benes & Hubbell until 1897, when Benes and Hubell departed to establish their own firm Hubbell & Benes. After their departure and Coburn's death, Barnum formed F. S. Barnum & Co. with Albert Skeel, Harry S. Nelson, Herbert Briggs, and Wilbur M. Hall. Barnum also served as consulting architect to the Cleveland Board of Education. He retired in 1915 having designed more than 75 school buildings, the Caxton Building (1903) and the Park Building (1904) (in Cleveland's Public Square), an early example of reinforced concrete floor slabs. The firm continued after his 1915 retirement under the name of Briggs & Nelson.

Several of its works are listed on the National Register of Historic Places (NRHP).

== Projects (Coburn & Barnum) ==
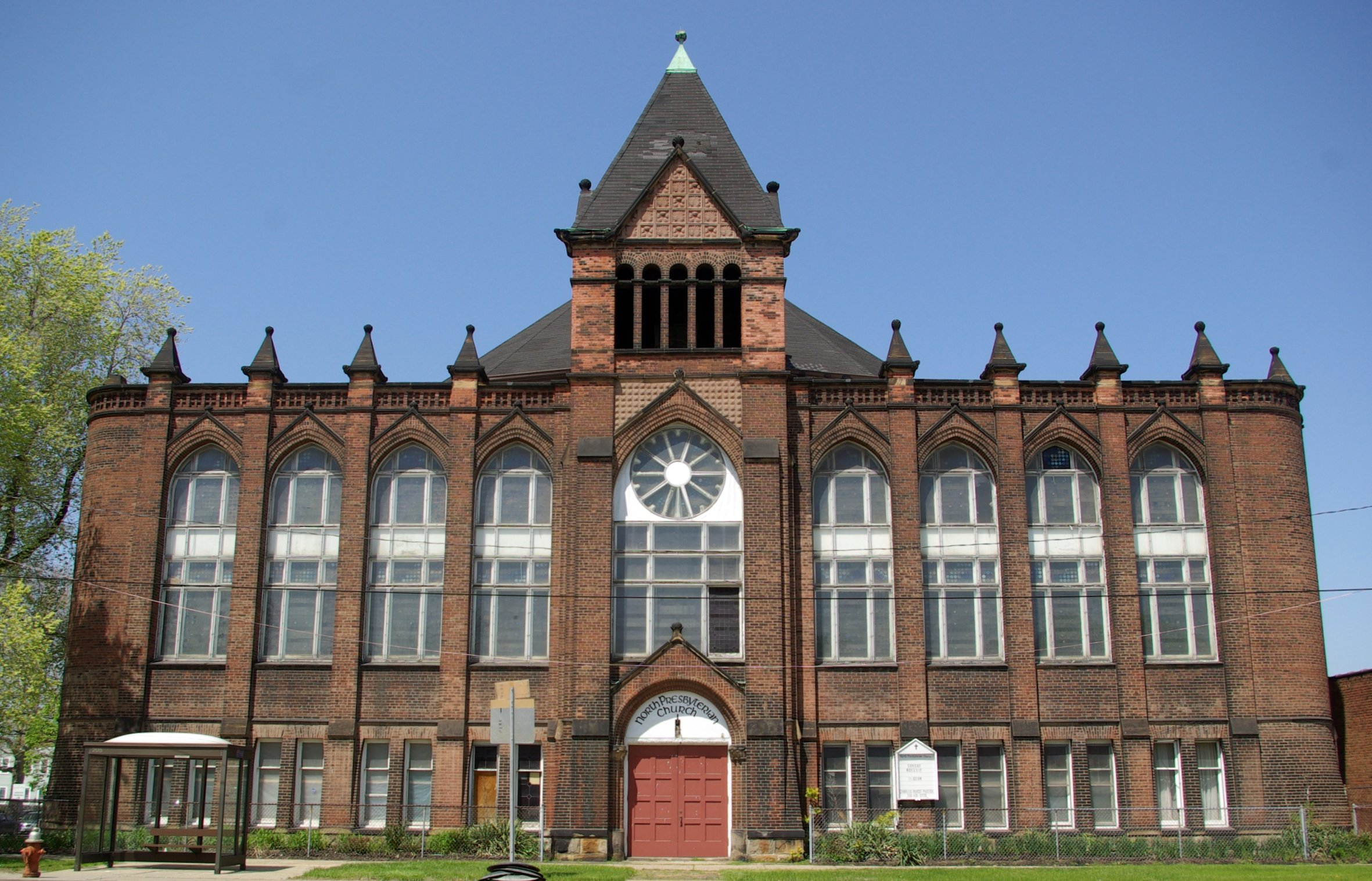
North Presbyterian Church

- Furniture Block ca. 1881–1882
- Blackstone Building ca. 1881–1882 (burned in 1897)
- First Congregational, Cleveland on Franklin Avenue
- Euclid Avenue Congregational Church on East 96th Street and Euclid Avenue. It was gutted by fire in 2010 and demolished.
- William J. Morgan residence
- George Howe residence (1893) at 2258 Euclid Avenue, also used as the Vixseboxse gallery, was acquired by Cleveland State University in 1982 and is now known as Parker Hannifin Hall, it is one of the few remaining homes from Millionaire's Row on Euclid Avenue.
- Washington H. Lawrence mansion (1898) on Lake Avenue, in 1947 the 24-room mansion was purchased for $75,000 and $350,000 worth of renovations completed for the Bay View Hospital osteopathic section complete with 75 beds. It was dedicated on October 3, 1948.
- Western Reserve University:
  - Medical School (1885–87)
  - Guilford College (1892)
- Olney Art Gallery on W. 14th Street (1893)., also known as Charles Olney House and Gallery, 2241–2255 W. Fourteenth St. Cleveland, Ohio (Coburn & Barnum), NRHP-listed
- North Presbyterian Church (1886–1887) listed on the NRHP (1974)
- St. Paul's Episcopal Church of East Cleveland, 15837 Euclid Ave. East Cleveland, Ohio (Coburn, Barnum, & Benes)
- One or more works in NRHP-listed Lorain Avenue Commercial Historic District, 3202–5730 Lorain Ave. Cleveland, Ohio (Coburn and Barnum)

== Projects (Coburn, Barnum, Benes & Hubbell, Betsch, Edward) ==
- St. Thomas Episcopal Church (1896), 214 E. Second St. Port Clinton, Ohio (Coburn, Barnum, Benes & Hubbell), NRHP-listed
- St. Thomas Episcopal Church, also known as St. Thomas Guild Hall, at 214 East Second Street in Port Clinton, Ohio.
- St. Paul's Episcopal Church of East Cleveland
