= East 4th Street (Cleveland) =

Avenue in Cleveland Ohio

Coordinates: 41°29′56″N 81°41′24″W

Official logo

East 4th Street is a major pedestrian zone in Downtown Cleveland, Ohio, known for its food, entertainment, and nightlife. The street runs south from Euclid Avenue to Prospect Avenue. Once a very run down street, the area has been renovated and revitalized by the establishment of numerous restaurants, bars, nightclubs, and apartments, turning it into one of the main nightlife hotspots in the city.

== Overview ==
The old Cleveland Arcade is located across Euclid Avenue from East 4th Street. The historic May Company Ohio Building is down Euclid Avenue toward Public Square. The new The Beacon apartment tower is across the street and down on East 6th Street. The Park Building, The Lofts at Rosetta Center, The Euclid, The Frederick, The Commercial, The Windsor, and The Buckeye Building are all apartment blocks in the area.

Additionally, the district butts up against the Gateway Sports and Entertainment Complex which includes Rocket Mortgage FieldHouse, home of the Cleveland Cavaliers, Progressive Field, home of the Cleveland Guardians, and numerous bars and restaurants.

The street is given a Mardi Gras atmosphere due to its being festooned with over hanging bubble lights along the entire length of the avenue. No vehicular traffic is allowed to travel up or down the street due to the heavy foot traffic.
