= Millpond Plantation =

Historic house in Georgia, United States

- U.S. National Register of Historic Places
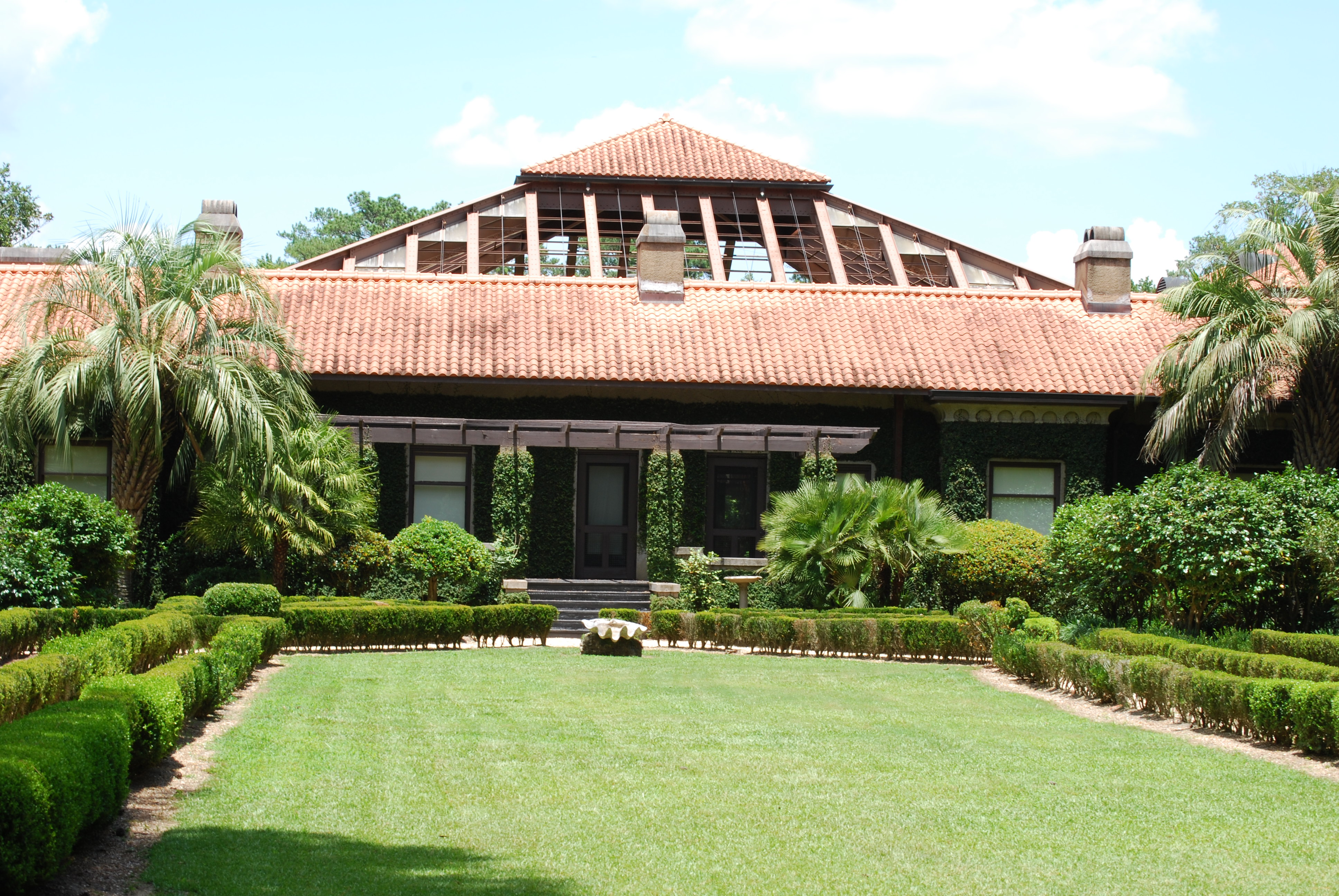

- Location within Georgia Location within the United States
- Location: South of Thomasville, Georgia on Pine Tree Blvd., Thomas County, Georgia
- Coordinates: 30.80304°N 83.97257°W
- Area: 1,200 acres (4.9 km^{2})
- Built: 1903-1910
- Architect: Hubbell & Benes; Warren Manning
- Architectural style: Mission/spanish Revival
- NRHP reference No.: 76000651
- Added to NRHP: December 12, 1976

The Millpond Plantation in Thomas County, Georgia near Thomasville was listed on the National Register of Historic Places in 1976.

The present main house was built between 1903 and 1905, and the complex was completed in 1910. Its architects were the noted Cleveland, Ohio, firm Hubbell & Benes and landscape design was by Warren Manning. The architecture is in the Mission/Spanish Revival style. The listing includes six contributing buildings and two contributing structures on 1,200 acres (4.9 km^{2}).
