= St. Luke's Hospital (Cleveland) =

- U.S. National Register of Historic Places
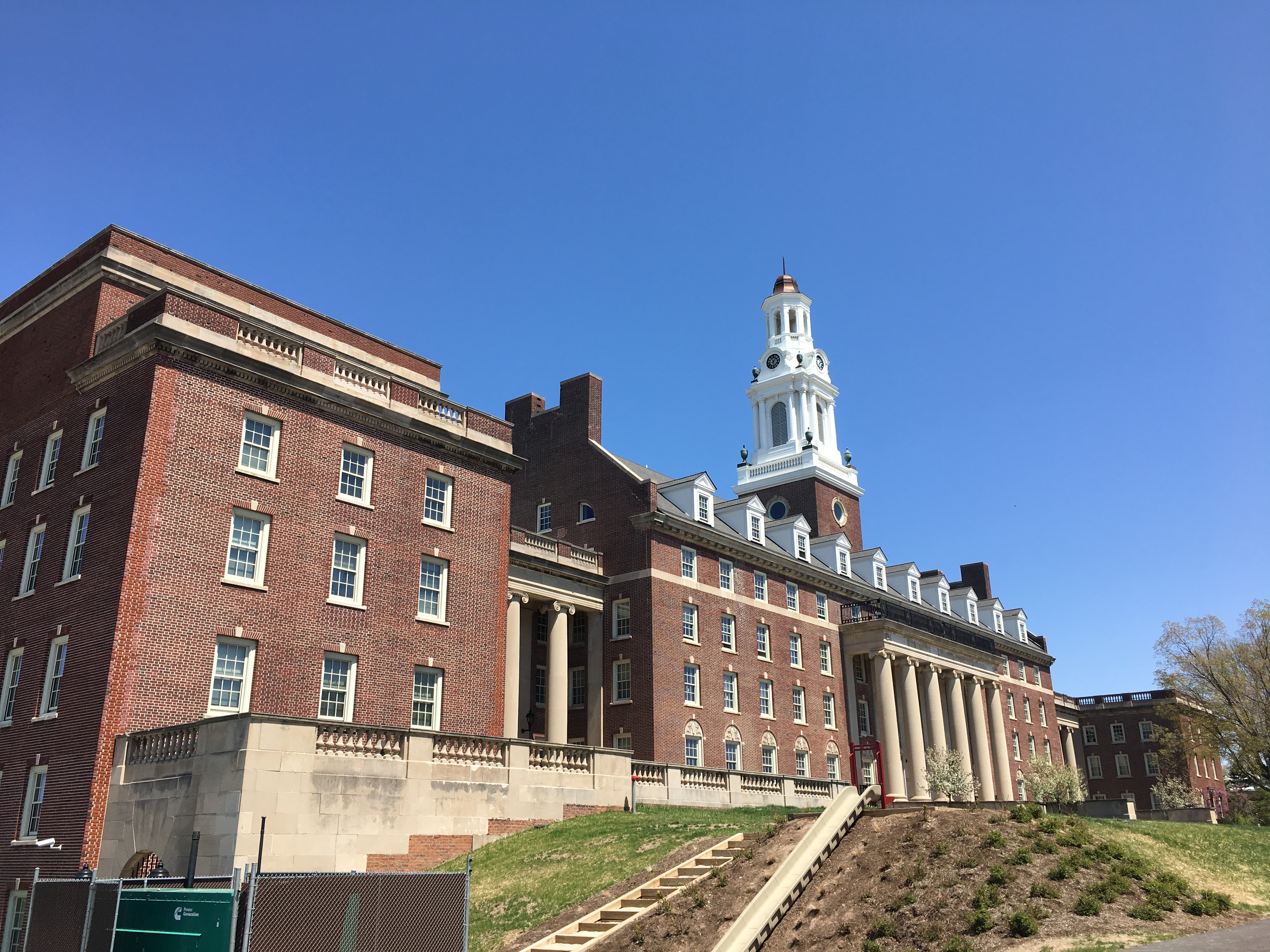
- South facade in 2018

- Location within Cleveland Location within Ohio Location within the United States
- Location: 11311 Shaker Blvd., Cleveland, Ohio
- Coordinates: 41°29′6″N 81°36′21″W
- Area: 8.2 acres (3.3 ha)
- Built: 1927
- Architect: Hubbell & Benes
- Architectural style: Georgian Revival
- NRHP reference No.: 05000579
- Added to NRHP: June 10, 2005

St. Luke's Hospital is a historic former hospital in the Woodland Hills neighborhood of Cleveland, Ohio. The building, designed in the Georgian Revival style by the Cleveland-based architectural firm Hubbell & Benes, was constructed in 1927 followed by completion of the originally planned east wing in 1929. As the hospital grew, later additions were made in the 1940s, 1960s, and 1970s. In May 1999, the hospital announced the closure of its Level 2 trauma center, and the hospital shut down the rest of its surgical and medical services later that summer.

After the closure of the hospital in 1999, the building was vacant for over 10 years, falling into decay and becoming a major target for vandals. In 2005, it was added to the National Register of Historic Places and the following year was purchased by Cleveland Neighborhood Progress with plans for residential redevelopment by 2008. The later additions from the 1940s, 1960s, and 1970s were demolished in 2007 leaving the original 380,000-square-foot (35,000 m^{2}), Georgian Revival building. Economic difficulties, however, prevented further work from beginning until 2011. The building was renovated and restored in three phases with the first two phases being an independent senior living and subsidized housing community called St. Luke's Manor. The central wing, with 72 apartments, was completed first in 2012, followed by an additional 65 apartments in the west wing in phase two. The 65,000-square-foot (6,000 m^{2}) east wing, which included the Prentiss Auditorium, was renovated in phase three, mainly for office use, and was mostly completed by late 2013 with the Prentiss Auditorium completed in late 2014 and dedicated in February 2015. Its anchor tenant is a charter school with approximately 250 students in grades K–8 along with a Boys & Girls Clubs of America location and offices for Cleveland Neighborhood Progress and the St. Luke's Foundation.
