= Union Gospel News =

- Type: weekly
- Publisher: Gospel News Company
- President: D. L. Davis
- Editor: D. L. Davis; R. M. Kurtz; F. M. Barton
- General manager: Horace H. Barrett
- Founded: 1888
- Ceased publication: June 28, 1906
- Headquarters: Caxton Building
- City: Cleveland, Ohio
- Country: U.S.

The Union Gospel News (1888-1906) was an American evangelical weekly newspaper of Cleveland, Ohio. It was published on Thursdays, from 1888 through June 28, 1906, by the Gospel News Company, which was located in the city's Caxton Building. The Union Gospel News was a 16 page undenominational religious paper, with circulation to ministers and laymen of all religious denominations. The subscription price was US$.50 per year. The Union Gospel News had a number of departments that made it attractive as a family paper. These included Editorial, Sermon (by Dr. J. Wilbur Chapman of New York), Bible Study, Sunday School Lesson Page, Young People's Society Notes, Inner Life Articles, Science Notes, Stories, Children's Page, Puzzle Column, and general reading.

== History ==
The Union Gospel News began publication in 1888 in Cleveland, Ohio. On July 8 of that year, copies of the publication were distributed to Cleveland's central police station. The following year, the publication was provided to the Elyria Free Reading Room, in the Eady & Foster block of Elyria, Ohio.

In April 1890, Minnie Harpster, of West Cairo, Ohio was appointed stenographer and private secretary for D. L. Davis, president of the Gospel News Company and the publication's editor. Horace H. Barrett served as the publication's manager in 1891. After marriage, Minnie Harpster Hartness and her husband continued to be connected with the publication while attending the Columbian Exposition in Chicago in 1893. In the early 1890s, L. H. Nelson served as secretary and treasurer of the Union Gospel News Company. In 1896, the average number of copies of each issue was 125,000. That year, Rev. Vesey, of Toledo, Ohio served as itinerant and collecting agent for the Union Gospel News Company, Mr. Reilley served as pressman, and Alta Gilliland accepted a position as stenographer. R. M. Kurtz served as editor in 1899.

In 1900, F. M. Barton was managing editor. In August of that year, the Union Gospel News had raised and forwarded to India nearly US$15,000 for the famine sufferers, and, in response to an appeal for help, the paper opened a fund for the purpose of assisting native Christians in China.

It was a distributor of successive issues of Marshall Everett's The Japanese Russian War in 1904.

== Contents ==
From 1901 to 1903, Dr. James Martin Gray of Boston wrote 104 articles in the Union Gospel News, which were republished in 1908 in book form. In October 1901, he began a two year course in Dispensational Bible Study. The first year of the course was in the Old Testament, with the New Testament following afterwards. Each week, the readers of that paper received a lesson by Epochs-a plan that was characterized as being altogether out of the ordinary. At the beginning of the course, over 10.000 new subscriptions to the Union Gospel News were received from persons who were anxious to take up the Dispensational Studies with Gray. A new department called "A Primer of the Faith" was begun in 1904, with Gray again writing on the topic.

Some of its articles and quotes were published in other media, such as "The Keeping Power of Prayer" (The Cleveland Leader, April 15, 1894), "The Bible in English" (The Weekly Jeffersonian, December 8, 1898), "Each glass of beer" (Edon Commercial, July 28, 1899), "Why a Man Left a Church" (Wellington Enterprise, April 19, 1899), "How Not to Grow Weary" (The Cleveland Leader, December 28, 1901), and "What the Church Teaches Regarding the Dance" (West Unity Reporter, September 28, 1904).

"The Redemption of David Corson", by Charles Frederic Goss , which came out originally in book form, was printed as a serial in the Union Gospel News in 1900. In 1900, over the course of three months, the Union Gospel News published Charles Sheldon's tragic story, "The Crucifixion of Phillip Strong", and it was illustrated for the first time by original photographs. "Christian Science Exposed" was presented in four sermons by Rev.A. C. Dixon, of Ruggles Street Baptist Church, Boston in four January 1905 issues.

Weekly evangelical sermons by Rev. John Wilbur Chapman, D.D.; weekly prayer-meeting discussions by Rev. A. C. Dixon, D.D.; a Department of Personal Work by Rev. Howard W. Pope; and a Home Department by Helen M. Winslow were included in 1903.

"All the tastes and inclinations of life are formed early" was quoted and expounded on The Greenville Journal on January 4, 1900. In "What Do You See?", a German allegory is explained (West Unity Reporter, October 2, 1901).

== Legacy ==
Microfilm format of the publication is held by the New York Public Library.
