= Belle Harpster Hartness =

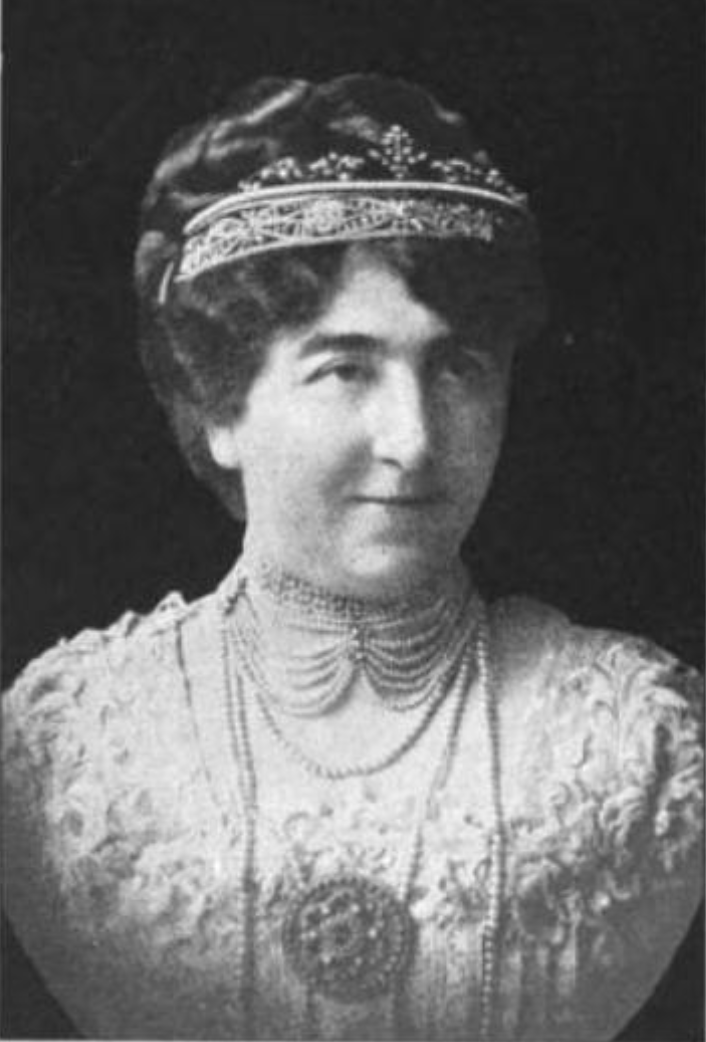
- Hartness in a 1917 publication.
- Born: Minnie Belle Harpster; October 25, 1867; Cairo, Ohio, U.S.
- Died: June 25, 1957 (aged 89); Springfield, Vermont, U.S.
- Burial place: Lake View Cemetery
- Occupations: stenographer; writer; lecturer; lady of letters
- Organization: Union Gospel News

Belle Harpster Hartness (née, Harpster; 1867–1957) was American stenographer, writer, lecturer, and lady of letters. She was prominent in the social world and in charitable work in London.

== Early life ==
Minnie Belle Harpster was born in Cairo, Ohio on October 25, 1867. Her parents were Thomas Harpster (b. 1840) and Margaret Jane (Reeder) Harpster.

== Career ==
In April 1890, Harpster was appointed stenographer and private secretary for D. L. Davis, president of the Gospel News Company and editor of the Union Gospel News. At the same time, she was an able literary writer, which admitted her to exclusive circles.

She met John A. Hartness (d. 1934, England) in Cleveland, Ohio; both were associated the Union Gospel News. They married on August 16, 1893. The following day, they left for the Columbian Exposition in Chicago.

In 1899, Mr. Hartness was made the head of the Jones & Lamson Machine Company in London, England; they moved to that city, making their home at 8 Gordon Street, Gordon Square. With her husband, Mrs. Hartness visited nearly every country on the European continent.

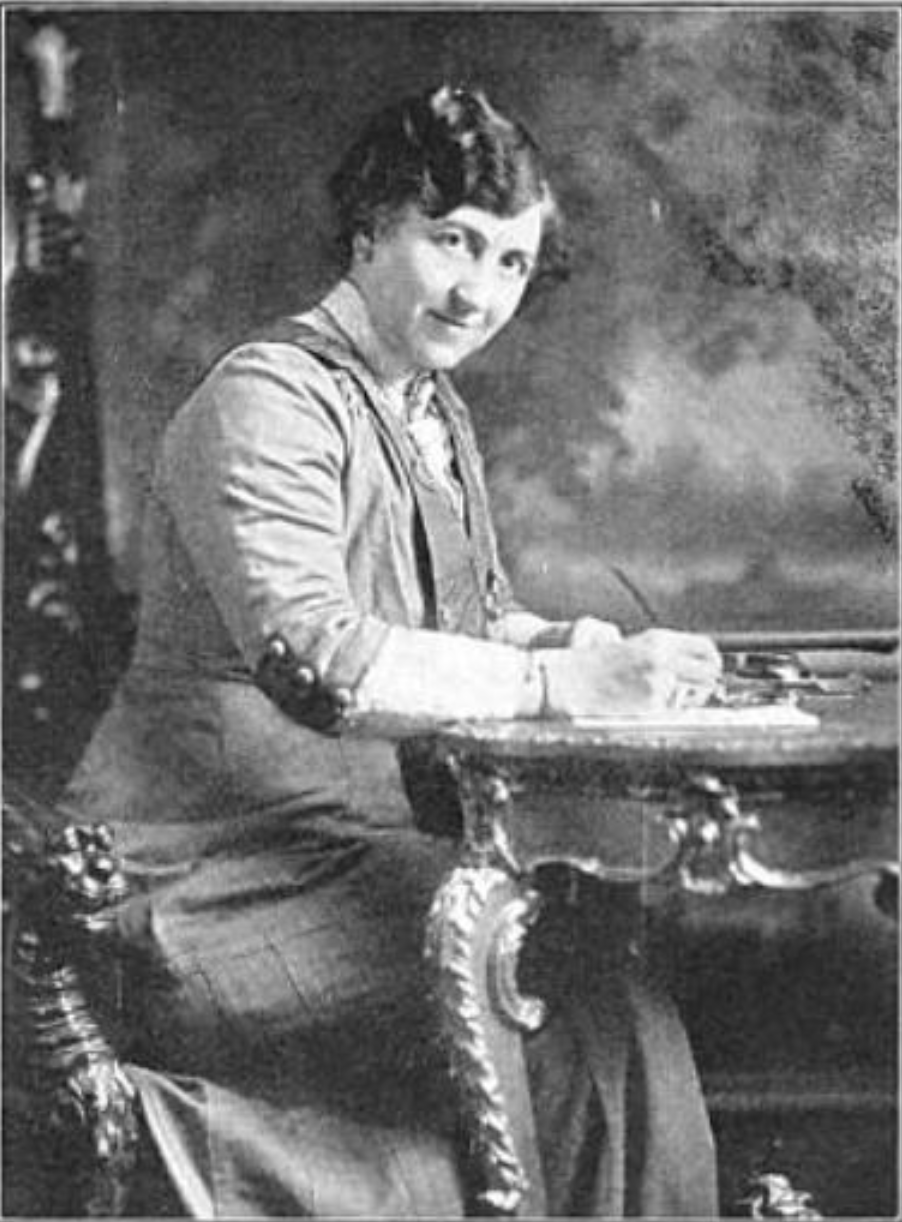
Hartness in a 1914 publication.

A writer, lecturer, and lady of letters, Mrs. Hartness served as honorary secretary of the American Circle in London. She was a delegate to the International Peace Congress in London some years later. As a special delegate of the American Circle of the Lyceum Club of London, she attended the meeting of the National League of American Pen Women in Washington, D.C.

Under the auspices of the Congregational Home Missionary Society, Hartness delivered her lecture "What Was the Star of Bethlehem?" in Lima, Ohio, in January 1914. The lecture was illustrated with reproductions of paintings and photographic appearances of the sky as taken by the astronomers of the United States, England, France, Germany. Hartness had given this lecture previously abroad and in New York City. She spent several years gathering the data and the pictures which illustrated her theory. With material gathered from the Bible and astronomical observatories of the world, Hartness unfolded her own theory of the story of the Star of Bethlehem.

In June of the following year, she accepted a position as private secretary to D. L. Davis, editor of the Union Gospel News.

During World War I, she worked for the American Circle of London.

== Personal life ==
Her husband's brother was Governor James Hartness of Vermont.

Belle Harpster Hartness died June 25, 1957, in Springfield, Vermont, and was buried in Lake View Cemetery, Cleveland, Ohio.

== Awards and honors ==
The 81st Ohio Volunteer Infantry (OVI) conferred upon her the title of "Daughter of Regiment". This was the regiment with which her father served through the Civil War.
