= AT&T Huron Road Building =

Art deco skyscraper located in downtown Cleveland, Ohio

Coordinates: 41°29′53.3″N 81°41′11″W

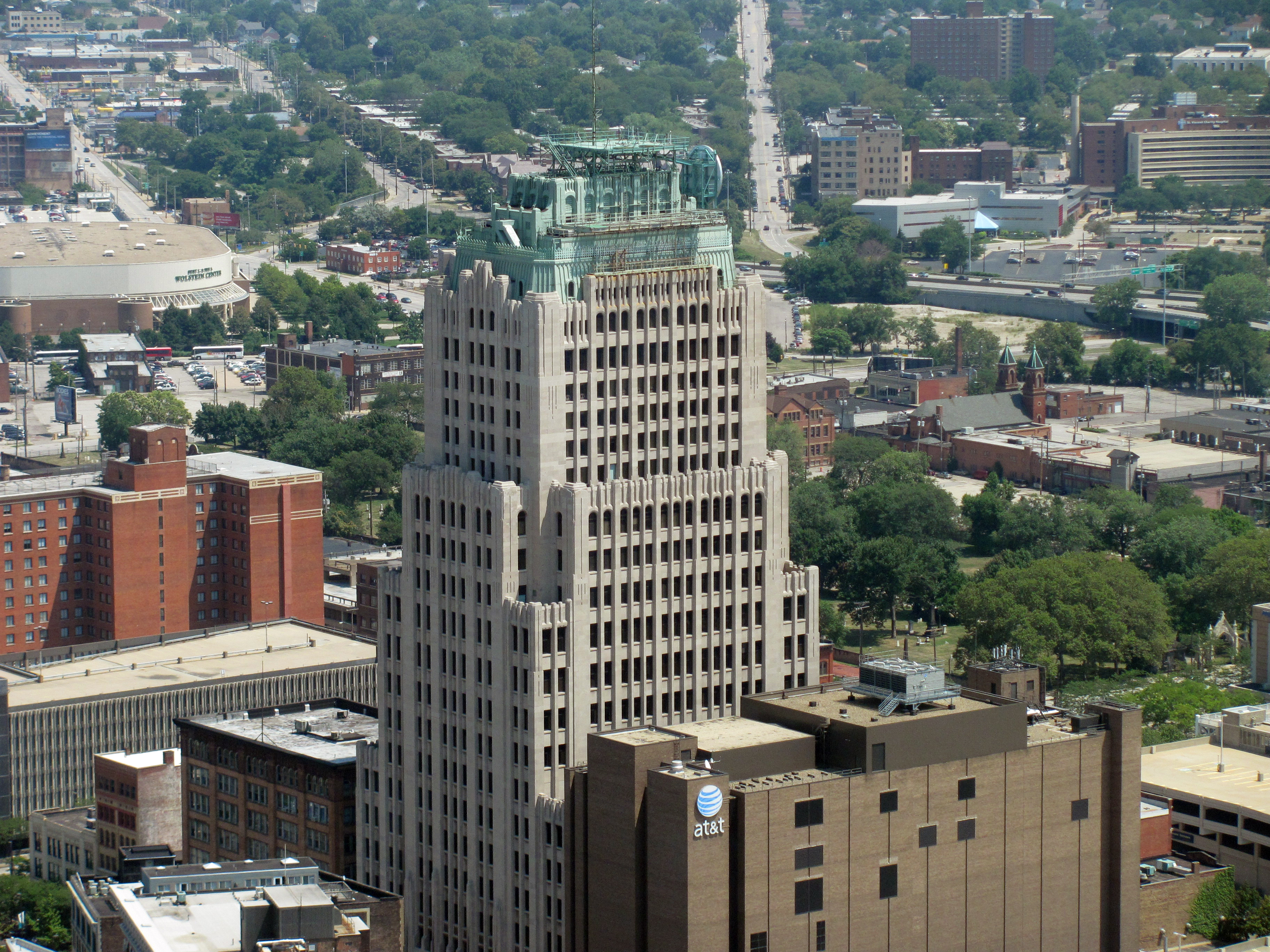
- View from the Terminal Tower observation deck
- Interactive map of the AT&T Huron Road Building area
- Former names: SBC Center, Ohio Bell Building

General information
- Type: Office
- Architectural style: Art Deco
- Location: 750 Huron Road Cleveland, Ohio 44113 United States
- Construction started: 1925
- Completed: 1927

Height
- Roof: 111.25 m (365 ft)

Technical details
- Floor count: 22

Design and construction
- Architect: Hubbell & Benes

The AT&T Huron Road Building (formally known as the Ohio Bell Building) is an art deco skyscraper located at 750 Huron Road in downtown Cleveland, Ohio. It serves as the corporate headquarters for Ohio Bell, a regional telephone company owned by AT&T. The building has 24 stories and rises to a height of 365 ft (111 m). It was designed by the firm of Hubbell and Benes, in what they called "Modern American Perpendicular Gothic", a style influenced by Eliel Saarinen's unrealized design for the Tribune Tower in Chicago. Work on the building began in 1925 and was completed in 1927 at a cost of $5 million. It was briefly the tallest building in Cleveland, surpassed in 1928 by the Terminal Tower.

== History ==
The Huron Road Building was built for necessity. Ohio Bell had its switching center on Michigan Avenue (now vacated) from 1890 to 1927. This building had to be vacated due to the construction of the Terminal Tower complex. During construction, some 10,000 miles of lines and switches were moved from Michigan Avenue to the current Huron Complex. In 1938, the Ohio Bell installed a new switching board, which, by 1944, was receiving some 25,300 long-distance calls daily on average.

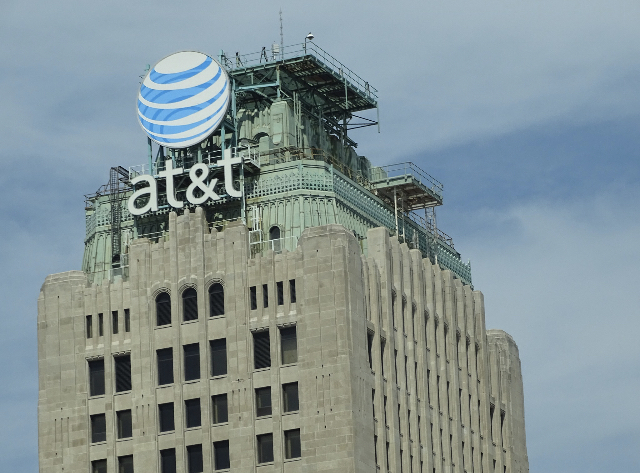

In 1964, Ohio Bell moved into the new Erieview Tower. The Huron Road building was retained as a telephone switching center for Downtown Cleveland. It was one of the biggest switching stations in the country for years. In 1983, Ohio Bell moved into its current location at 45 Erieview. Today, the Huron Road building has been expanded for DSL service for Cleveland.

== References in Pop Culture ==
- The building's current owners claim that Superman co-creator Joe Shuster used it as the model for the Daily Planet building, but Shuster himself denied that Cleveland provided any visual inspiration for Metropolis.
- The tower can be seen on the ABC miniseries Agent Carter in several episodes as a backdrop outside the offices of the SSR.
- The tower can also be seen briefly in The Avengers film.

== See also ==
- List of tallest buildings in Cleveland
