= Cleveland Masonic Temple =

- U.S. National Register of Historic Places
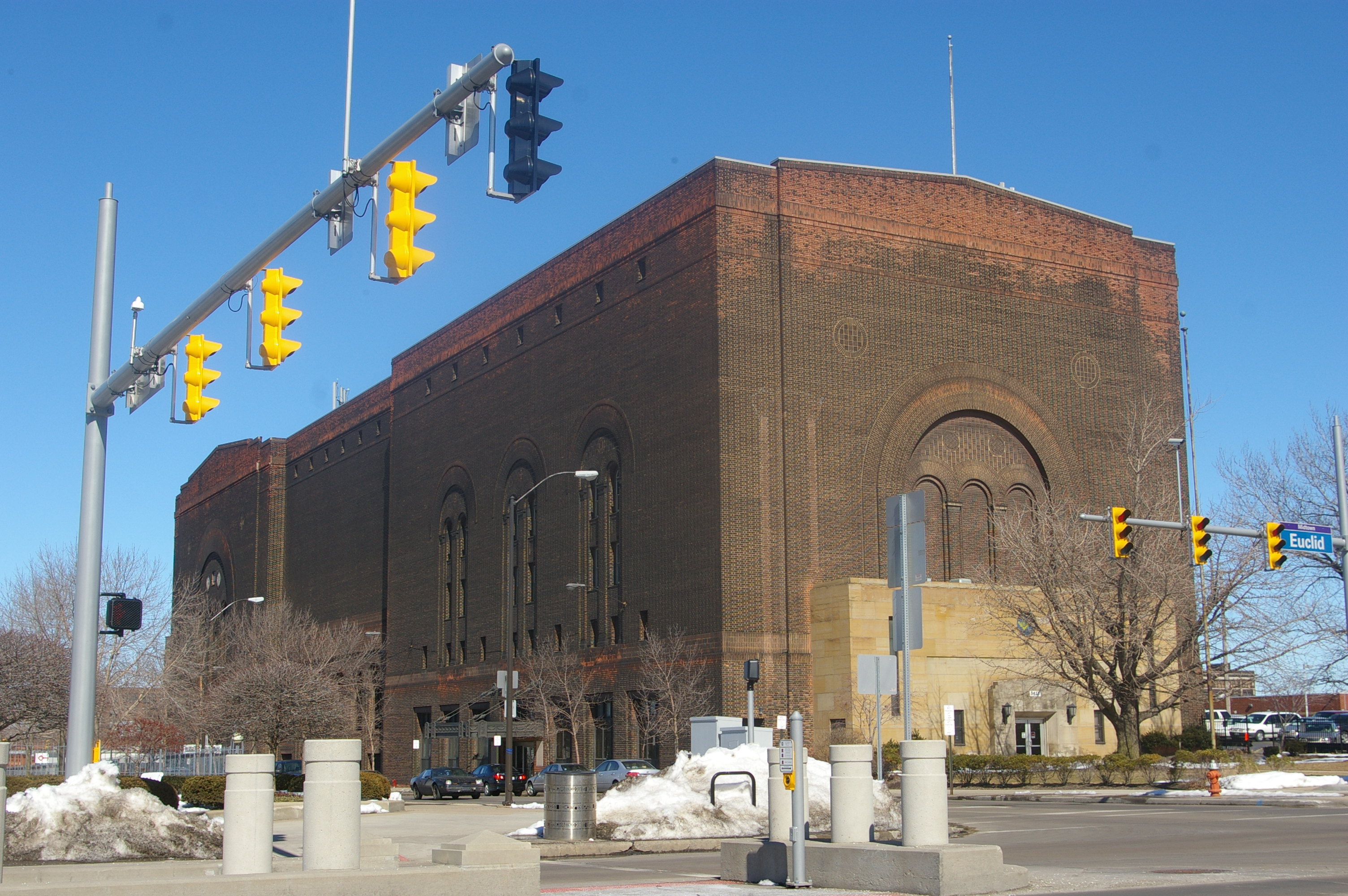

- Location within Cleveland Location within Ohio Location within the United States
- Location: 3615 Euclid Ave., Cleveland, Ohio
- Coordinates: 41°30′13″N 81°39′44″W
- Area: 2.8 acres (1.1 ha)
- Built: 1921
- Architect: Hubbell & Benes
- Architectural style: Late 19th And Early 20th Century American Movements
- NRHP reference No.: 01000894
- Added to NRHP: August 17, 2001

The Cleveland Masonic Temple in Cleveland, Ohio is an auditorium and banquet hall which opened in 1921. It is noted for containing two large organs (Austin opus 823 and a Wurlitzer Opus 793), and for many years was home to the Cleveland Orchestra. It was designed by the architectural firm of Hubbell and Benes.

It was listed on the National Register of Historic Places in 2001, and the venue continues to host concerts, like the Decemberists, and in recent years has also held professional wrestling events from numerous promotions, such as Total Nonstop Action Wrestling (TNA), the National Wrestling Alliance (NWA), and Game Changer Wrestling (GCW).

Besides the main auditorium (which features 2,200 theater seats, and extra floor seating capable of being added for concerts and wrestling), there is also a banquet hall and lounge as part of the complex, which can be used for wedding receptions, business meetings, or charity events.
