= 75 Public Square =

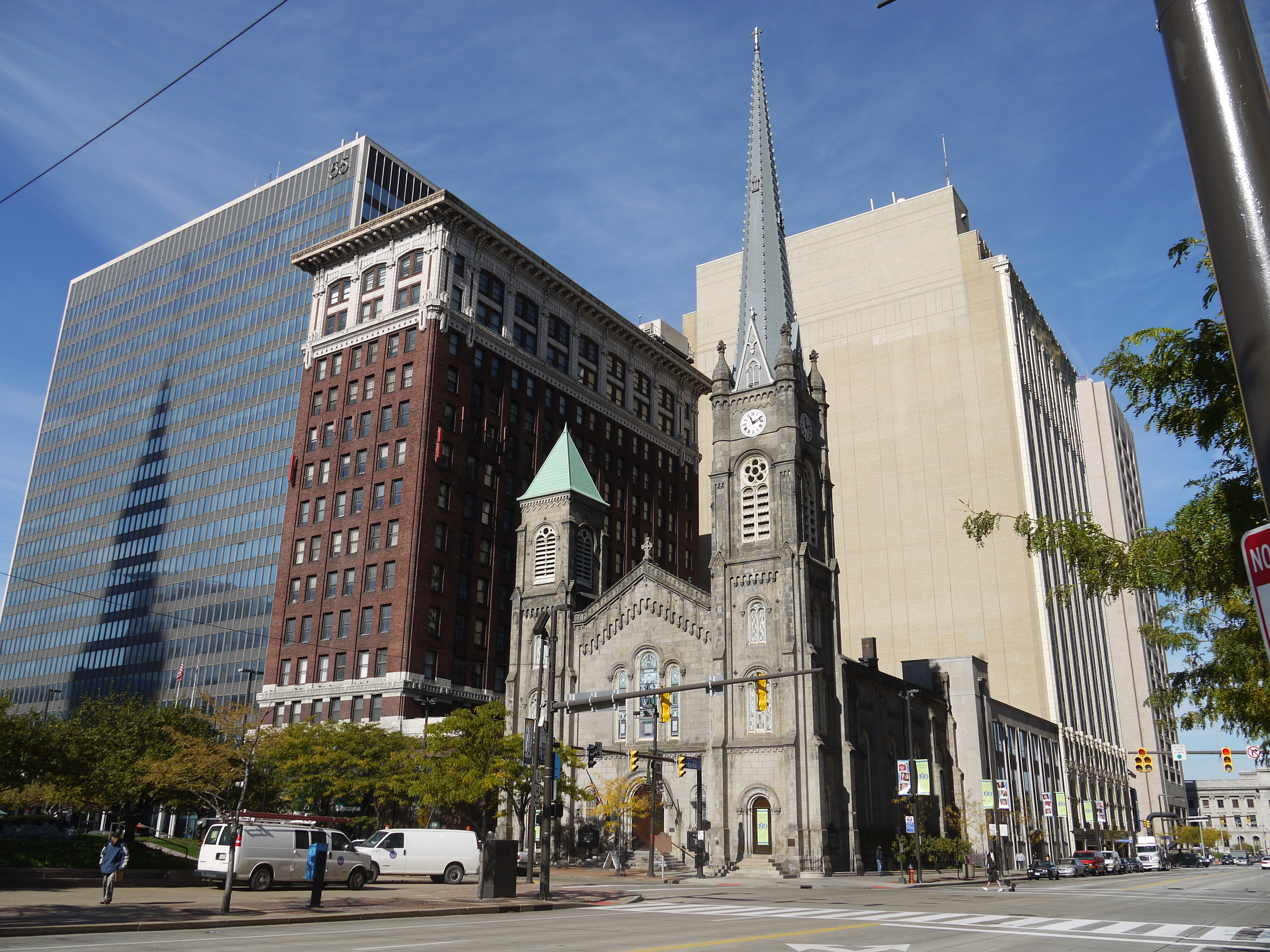
- 75 Public Square sits between 55 Public Square and the Old Stone Church
- Interactive map of the 75 Public Square area
- Former names: Illuminating Building

General information
- Status: Completed
- Type: Offices
- Location: 75 Public Square, Cleveland, United States
- Coordinates: 41°30′0.77″N 81°41′42.35″W
- Construction started: 1913
- Completed: 1915

Height
- Height: 187 feet (57 m)

Technical details
- Floor count: 15

Design and construction
- Architecture firm: Hubbell & Benes

75 Public Square is a high-rise office building on Public Square in downtown Cleveland, Ohio. It was designed by the Cleveland architectural firm of Hubbell & Benes and was completed in 1915. It served as the headquarters for the Cleveland Electric Illuminating Company until the construction of the adjacent 55 Public Square in 1958. The building also abuts Cleveland's historic Old Stone Church. In 2014, the Millennia Companies, planning to convert the building into apartments, purchased the building for $4 million.
