= St. Paul's Episcopal Church of East Cleveland =

Historic church in Ohio, United States

- U.S. National Register of Historic Places
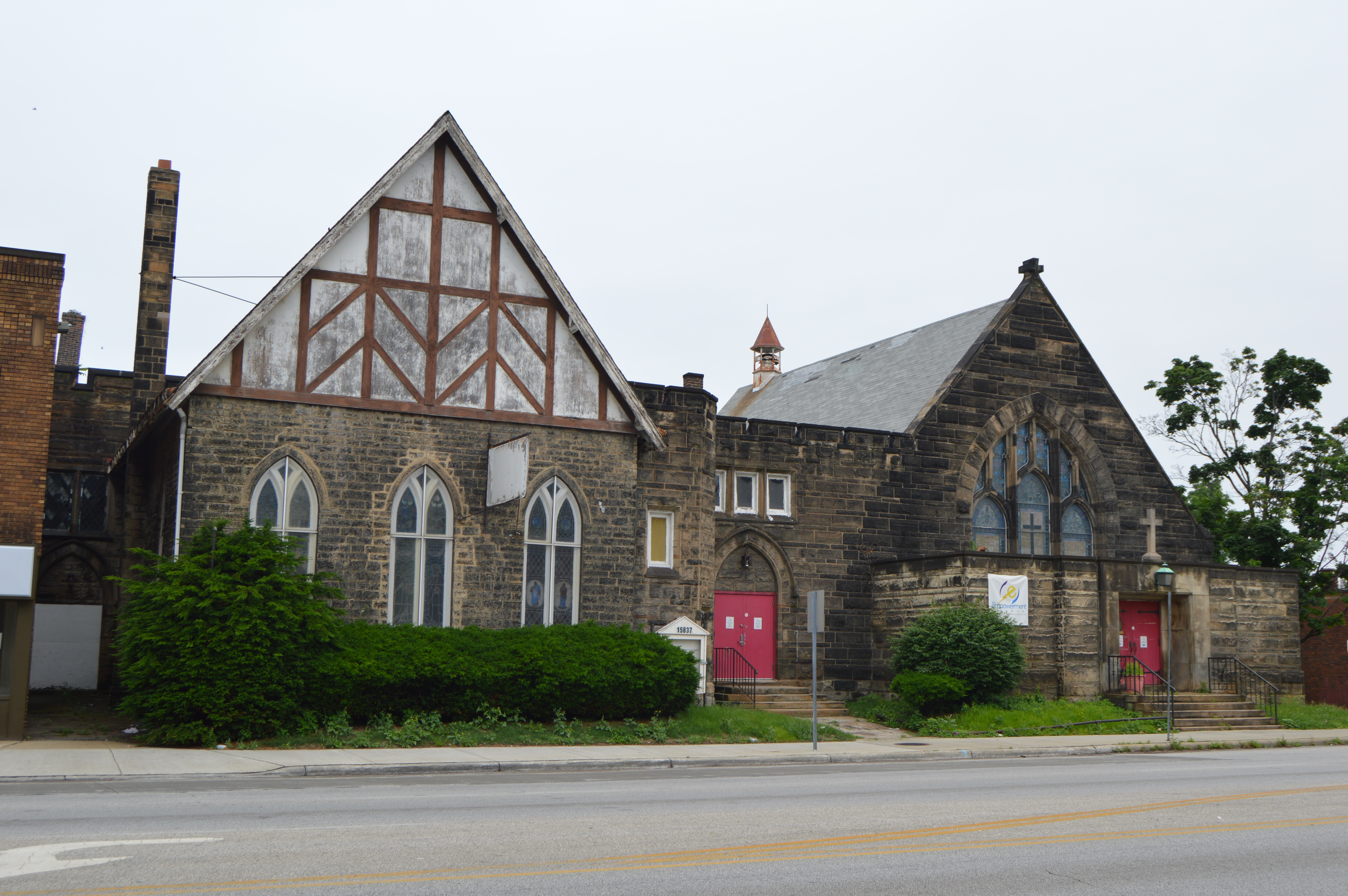
- Front and western side

- Location within Ohio Location within the United States
- Location: 15837 Euclid Ave., East Cleveland, Ohio
- Coordinates: 41°32′30.83″N 81°34′13.53″W
- Built: 1846
- Architect: Coburn, Barnum, & Benes
- Architectural style: Gothic Revival
- NRHP reference No.: 84000130
- Added to NRHP: October 18, 1984

St. Paul's Episcopal Church of East Cleveland is a church building in East Cleveland, Ohio. It was built in 1846, and it was listed on the U.S. National Register of Historic Places in 1984. It is credited to the firm of Coburn, Barnum, & Benes. The current occupants are a congregational church, the "Empowerment Church".

== See also ==
- St. Paul's Episcopal Church
