= Caxton Building =

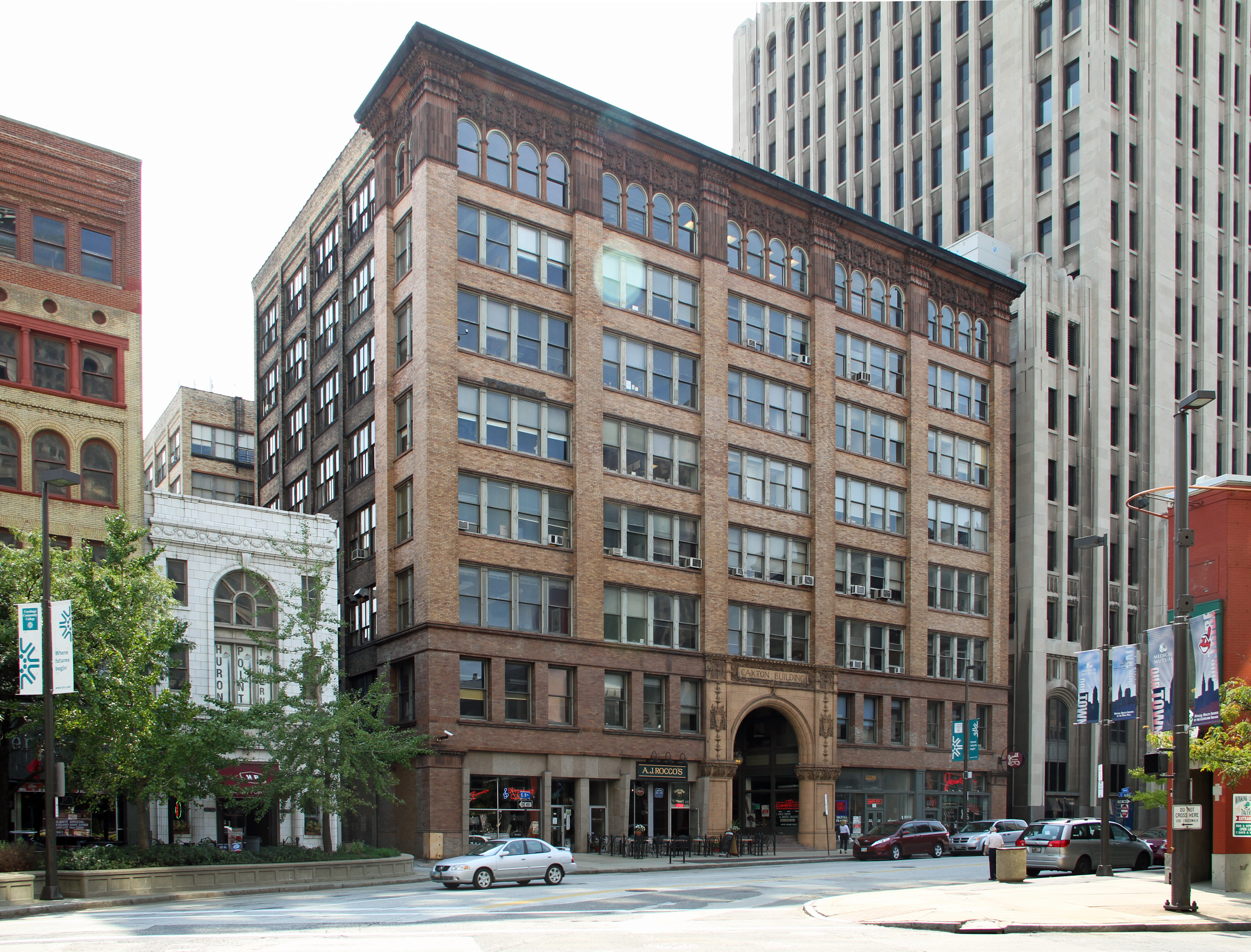
- Interactive map of the Caxton Building area

General information
- Status: Completed
- Location: Cleveland, Ohio, US, 812 Huron Road
- Coordinates: 41°29′53.8″N 81°41′9.9″W
- Completed: 1903

Website
- www.caxtoncleveland.com

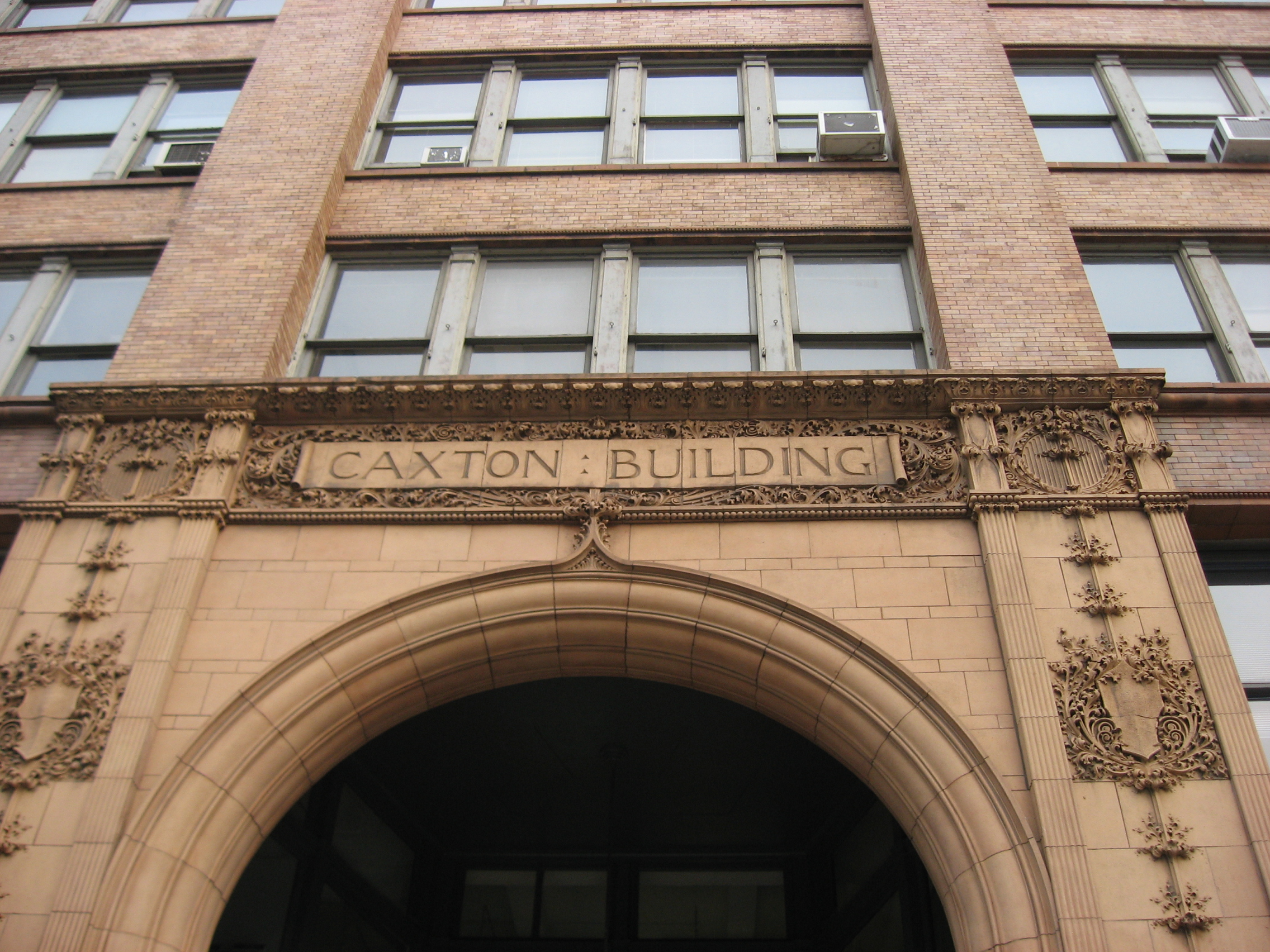
Caxton Building archway

The Caxton Building is a historic building completed in 1903 in Cleveland, Ohio, US. It was designed by Frank Seymour Barnum's F. S. Barnum & Co architectural firm. The 8-story steel-frame office building was constructed for the Caxton Building Company and its president Ambrose Swasey. It housed graphic arts and printing businesses, and was named after William Caxton, a British printer in the 15th century.

The main entrance to the building is a Romanesque architecture style terra cotta archway. It includes intricate organic cartouches in the style popularized by American architect Louis Sullivan, as well as column capitals accenting its buff-colored masonry. Its ground floor retail frontage has included restaurants and cafes.

== History ==
The building was designed to accommodate heavy printing presses. In 1905, it housed Alfred Cahen's business which became the World Publishing Company. Through 1906, the Gospel News Company published the Union Gospel News in the Caxton Building.

The Caxton Building was added to the National Register of Historic Places in October, 1973. It was declared a Cleveland landmark in 1976. The building underwent restorations in the 1990s.

== See also ==
- World Publishing Company
