= West Side Market =

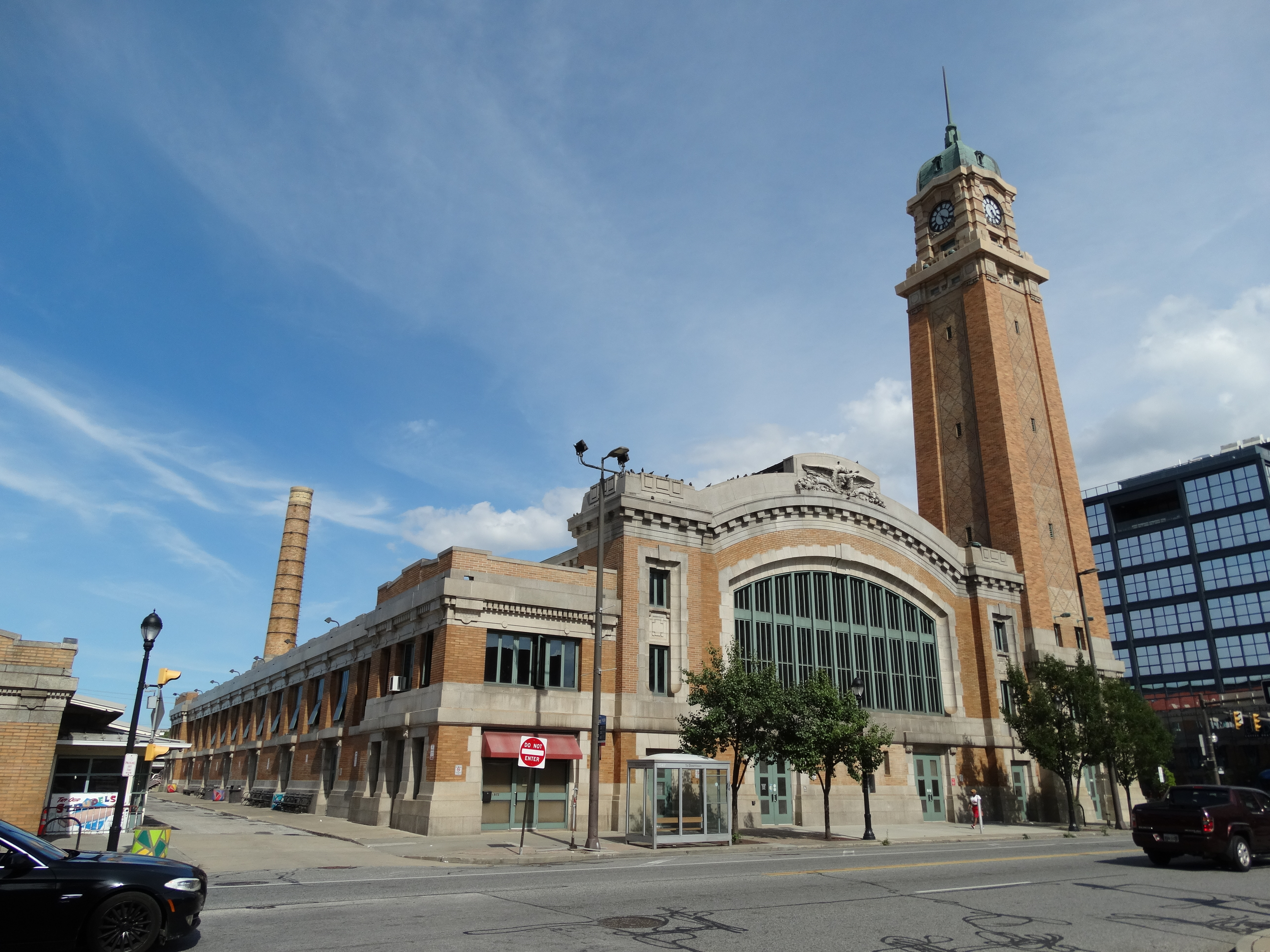
- View of the market from West 25th Street
- Interactive map of the West Side Market area

General information
- Type: Market hall
- Location: 1979 West 25th Street, Cleveland, Ohio, United States
- Coordinates: 41°29′4″N 81°42′11″W}
- Construction started: 1907; 119 years ago
- Completed: 1912; 114 years ago
- Owner: City of Cleveland

Design and construction
- Architecture firm: Hubbell & Benes

Website
- westsidemarket.org
- West Side Market
- U.S. National Register of Historic Places
- Cleveland Landmark
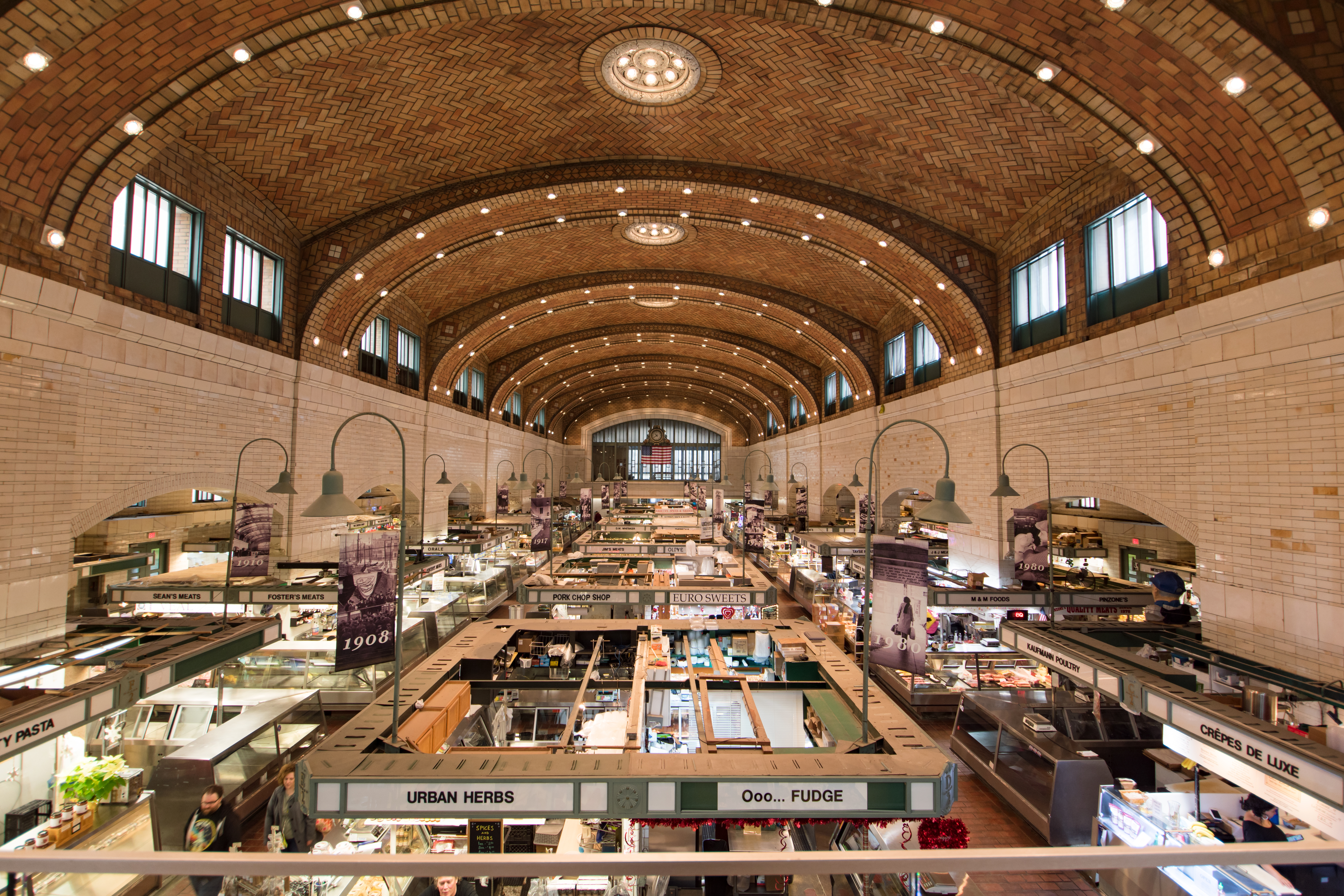
- Interior of the market

- Location within Cleveland Location within Ohio Location within the United States
- NRHP reference No.: 73001423
- Added to NRHP: December 18, 1973

The West Side Market is the oldest operating indoor/outdoor market space in Cleveland, Ohio. It is located at the corner of West 25th Street and Lorain Avenue in the Ohio City neighborhood. On December 18, 1973, it was added to the National Register of Historic Places.

== History ==
The market began operating in 1840, across the street from its current location. Josiah Barber and Richard Lord, prominent businessmen and both former mayors of Ohio City before it was incorporated into Cleveland, donated land to Ohio City's government, stipulating that the tract be used for an open-air neighborhood market. The market space became a center of the Ohio City community for the next three decades and other benefactors donated adjacent lands allowing the marketplace to expand. In 1868, a one-story, wooden framed building was erected on the site, and the newly christened Pearl Street Market was opened.

Thanks to brisk population growth in Cleveland and Ohio City in the latter part of the 19th century, the market outgrew its space again. In 1902, lands were purchased across the street from the Pearl Market site to allow for market expansion and eventual construction of additional indoor market space. Cleveland architectural firm Hubbell and Benes was contracted to create the new indoor space and, after nearly a decade of planning and construction, the current West Side Market building was completed in 1912 at a cost of nearly $680,000. The Neo-Classical/Byzantine building is a brick construct with a large interior concourse that provides nearly 100 stalls for sellers and an 85-stall outdoor produce arcade that wraps around the side and rear of the main building. In addition, the building has a large clock tower, easily visible from most of Ohio City in the building's early days.

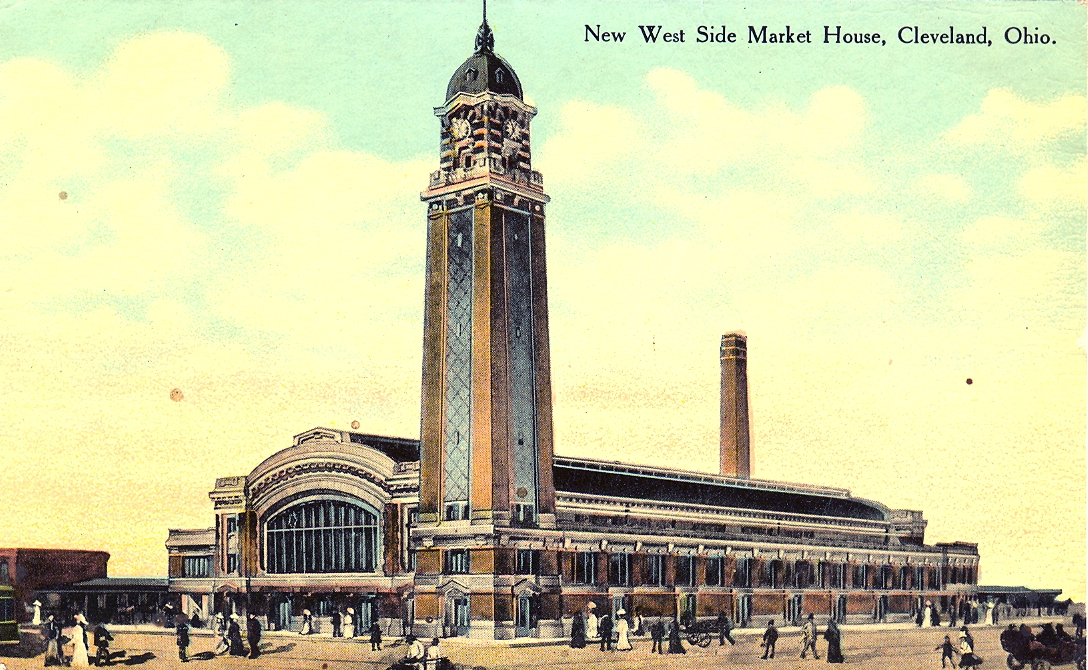
Postcard of the West Side Market, circa 1912

In 1915, the permanent building spurred sellers to establish the West Side Market Tenants' Association, a coalition founded to help maintain the market and organize for future improvements and additions. This organization exists at the Market today.

Periodic upgrades accommodated more tenants and maintained and improved the overall conditions. A fuller, $1.1 million modernization was undertaken in 1953 to add lower-level storage areas and upgrade stalls in the arcade. Another renovation, this one for $5 million, took place after the Market was added to the National Register of Historic Places in 1973.

The market's profile rose in the latter 20th century. Politicians passing through Cleveland often stopped in to sample the array of foods sold at the market on any given day. The market also began sponsoring major food festivals in the neighborhood which drew people from Cleveland and the rest of the world. Despite the successes of the 1980s, however, the market began to face financial straits as Cleveland itself was experiencing monetary struggles. A large portion of the market's subsidies from the city dried up, leaving tenants facing higher rents to keep the market open. Yet the market expanded and was renovated throughout the 1990s and into the 21st century.

A 2004 project enclosed and added space heating to the arcade portion of the market, as well as completed major interior and architectural renovations to the main building. The market's centennial was celebrated in 2012.

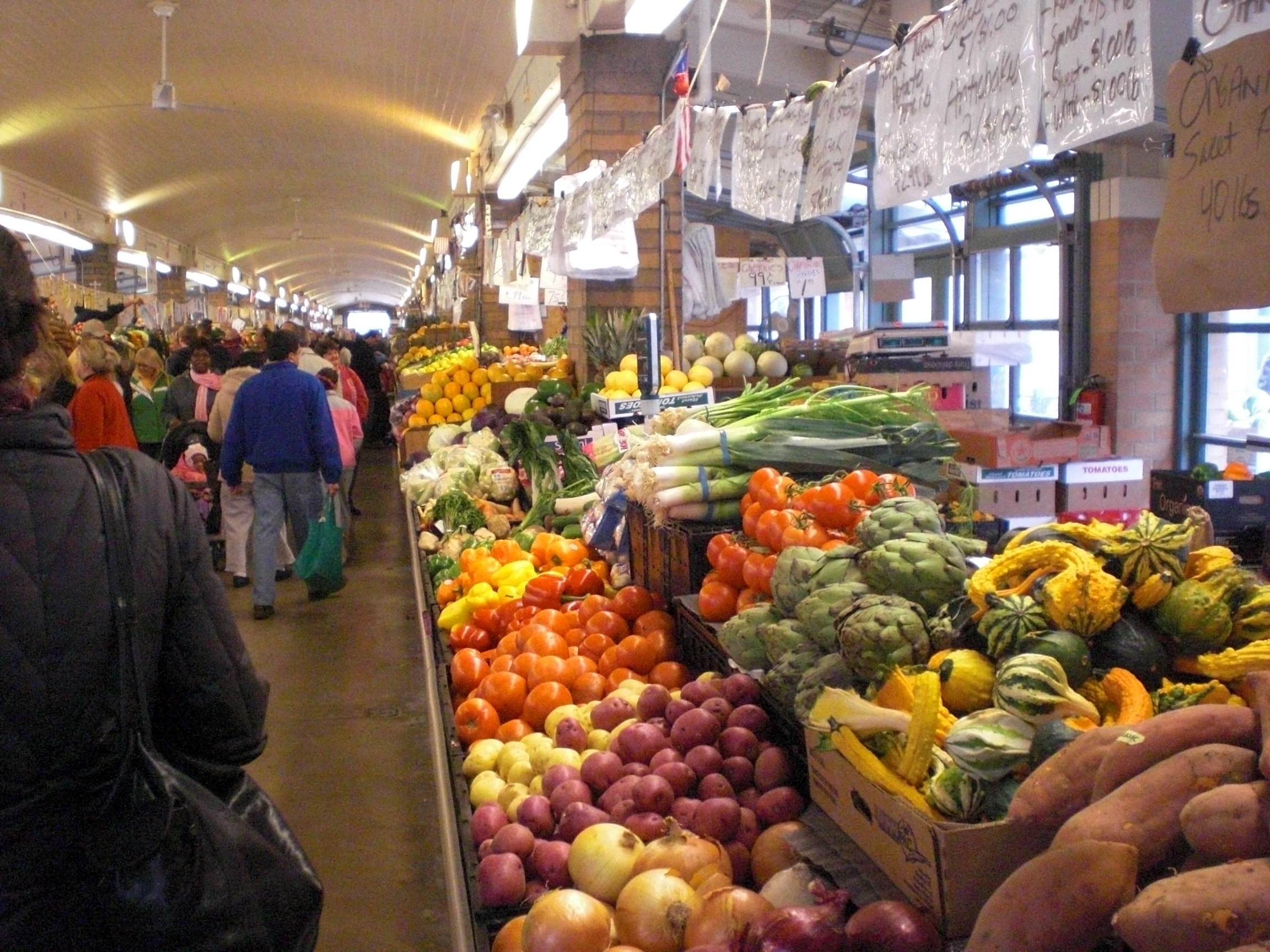
Produce section of the market

The market attracts tourists from all parts of the United States, who visit and learn about its history. Its national profile has been boosted in recent years by coverage on various programs produced by the Travel Channel and Food Network.

Many stalls have remained under individual family control for much of the life of the market, several dating to 1912. The market's tenants and sellers reflect the cultural diversity of the surrounding neighborhood and Cleveland as a whole. The current roster of tenants includes those of Irish, German, Slovene, Italian, Hungarian, Greek, Polish, Russian, and Middle Eastern descent, among others.

In the September 2010 issue of Food Network Magazine, the West Side Market was named America's "Best Food Lovers' Market."

In 2016 city officials announced that starting April 3 of that year the market would add regular Sunday hours for the first time in its history.

The city of Cleveland transferred management of the market to the non-profit board Cleveland Public Market Corporation on April 24, 2024; the city retains ownership.

As of 2025 the market was in the beginning stages of a renovation.
