= East End Baptist Church =

Historic church in Alabama, United States

- U.S. National Register of Historic Places
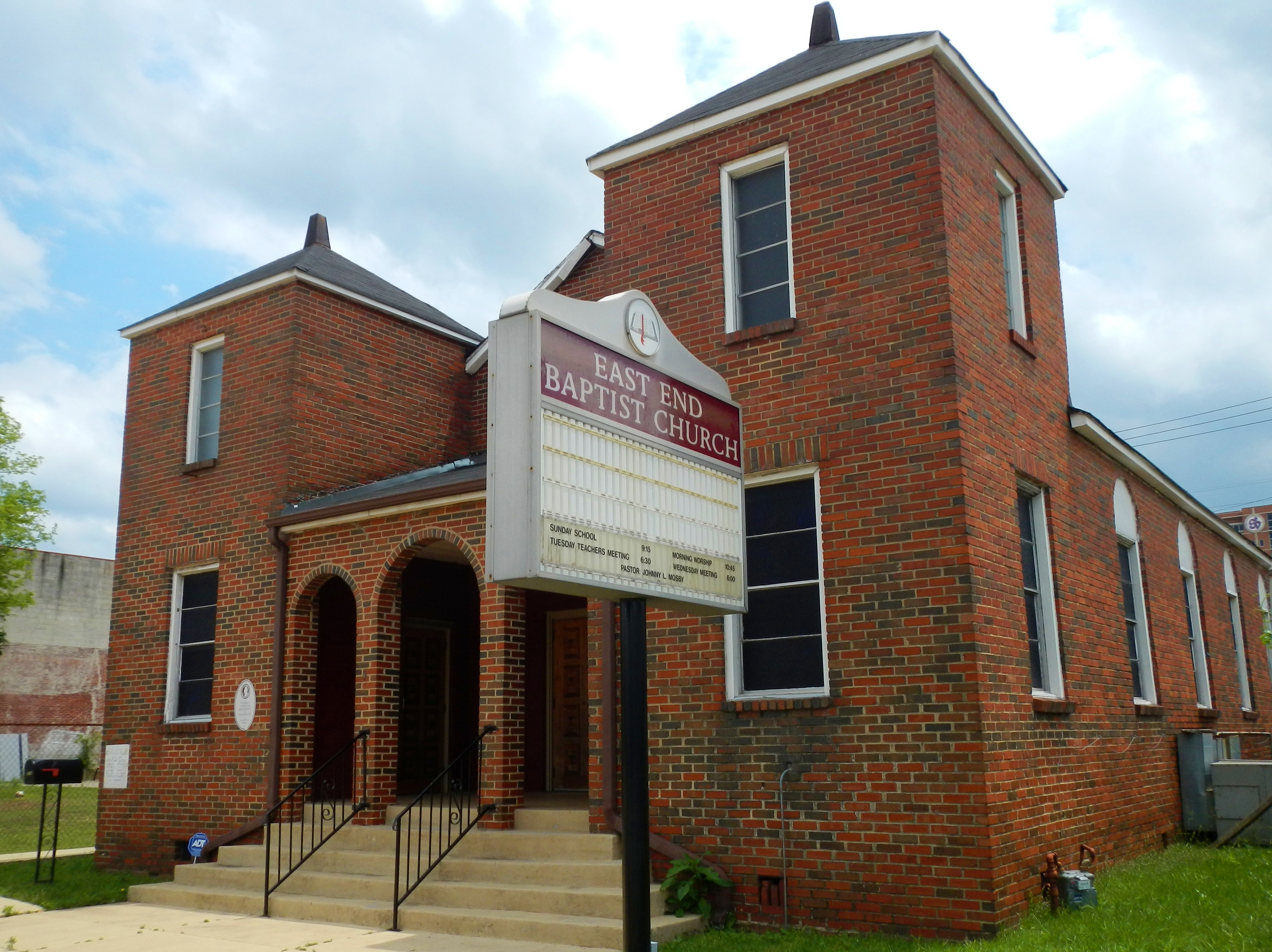

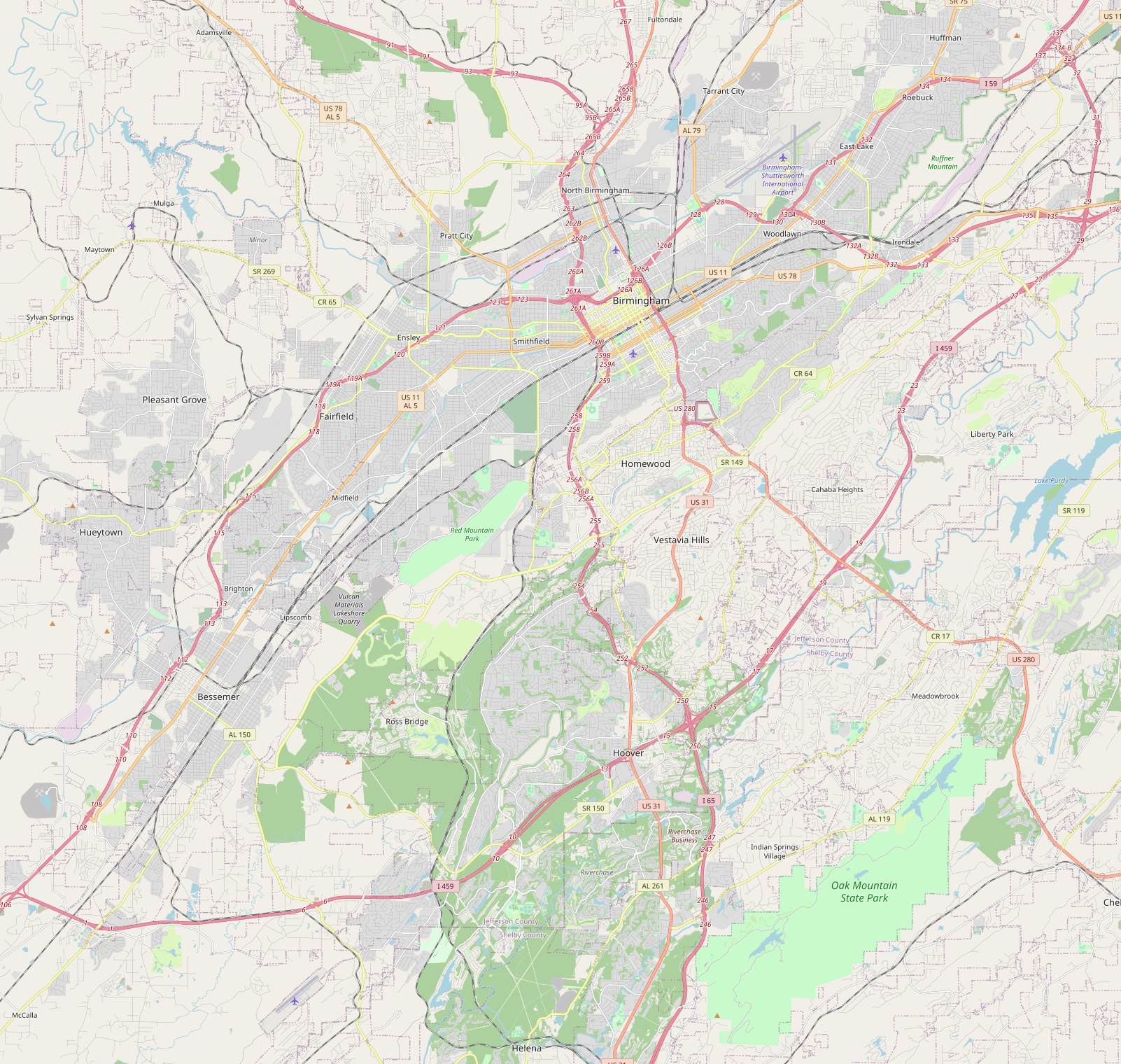
- Location within Birmingham, Alabama Location within Alabama Location within the United States
- Location: 2609 Sixth Ave. S, Birmingham, Alabama
- Coordinates: 33°30′45″N 86°47′33″W
- Area: less than one acre
- Built: 1947
- Architectural style: Renaissance
- MPS: Civil Rights Movement in Birmingham, Alabama MPS
- NRHP reference No.: 05000292
- Added to NRHP: April 22, 2005

East End Baptist Church is a historic Baptist church building at 2609 Sixth Avenue South in Birmingham, Alabama. It was built in 1947 in a style that can be described as Romanesque Revival, but has been well described by Jay Price as mid-century traditional. It added to the National Register of Historic Places in 2005. During the Civil Rights Movement it was led by the Reverend Calvin W. Woods.
