= Park Building (Cleveland) =

- U.S. National Register of Historic Places
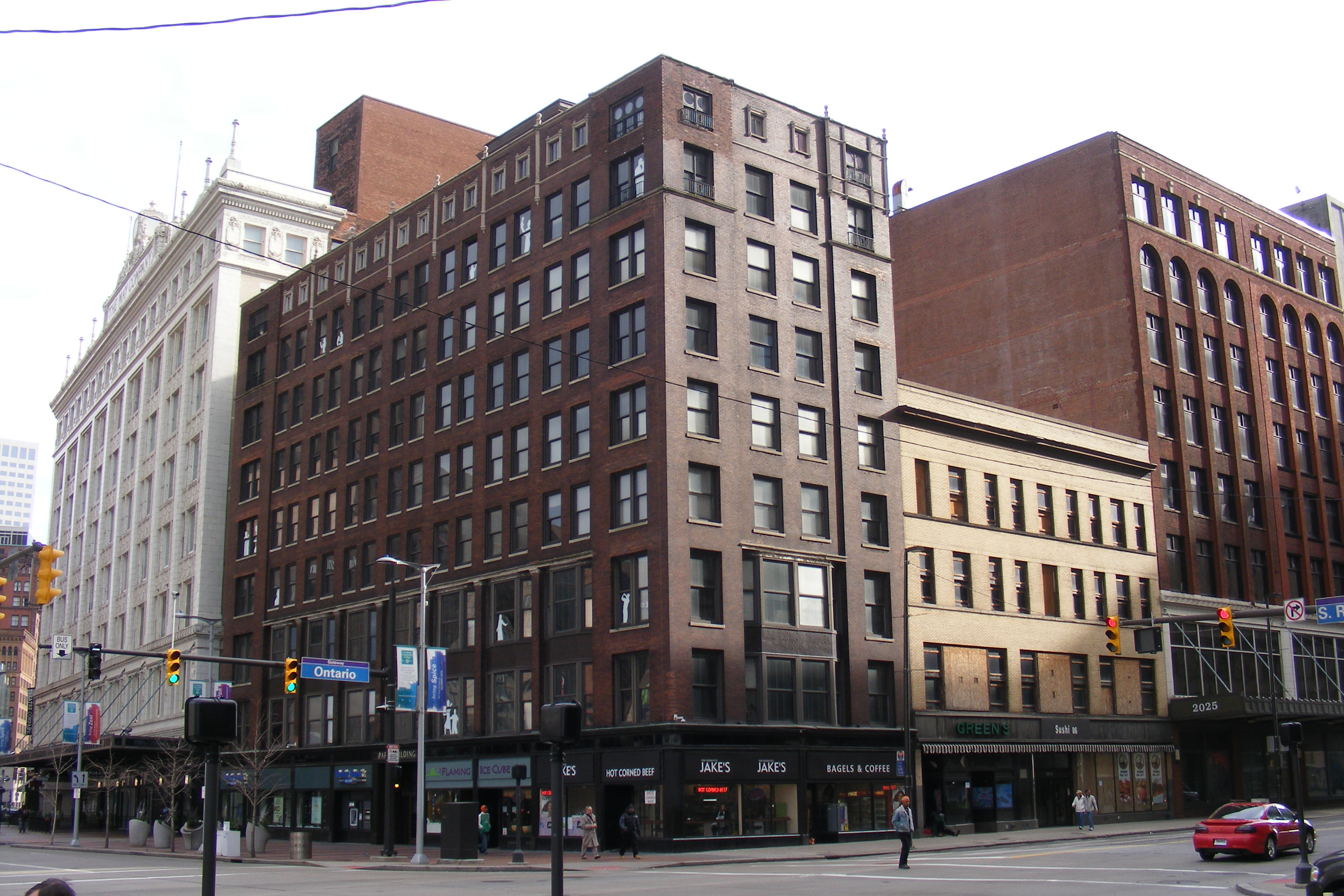
- Northern side (left) and front (right)

- Location within Cleveland Location within Ohio Location within the United States
- Location: 140 Public Square, Cleveland, Ohio
- Coordinates: 41°29′24″N 81°41′0″W
- Area: Less than 1 acre (0.40 ha)
- Architect: Frank S. Barnum and Company
- Architectural style: Early Commercial
- NRHP reference No.: 96000674
- Added to NRHP: July 1, 1996

The Park Building is a historic commercial building on Public Square in downtown Cleveland, Ohio, United States. It was named a historic site in 1996.

Nine stories tall, the Park Building abuts a four-story building to the south and the taller May Company Building to the rear; the side facing Public Square is several times the length of the Ontario Street-facing front. The walls are primarily brick, covered with an asphalt roof and resting on a concrete foundation. Concrete construction is a distinguishing feature of the architecture; the Park Building was one of Cleveland's earliest office towers with floors constructed of reinforced concrete. This usage reflects the tastes of the architect, Frank Seymour Barnum, one of the region's pioneers of twentieth-century architectural methods. Among its architectural details are large bay windows with bronze and granite components, floors mixing terrazzo with stone, and carefully formed woodwork.

For much of its history, the Park Building was used by small service businesses, including dentists, barbers, architects, and lawyers, but some spaces were used for purposes ranging from insurance sales to periodicals publication to foreign consulates. It was owned by the same family from construction in 1904 until a 2006 sale to developer Matt Howells, who later converted it into condominia; the first residents moved into the building in early 2009. Thirteen years earlier, it had been listed on the National Register of Historic Places because of its architectural significance.
