= St. Thomas Episcopal Church (Port Clinton, Ohio) =

Historic church in Ohio, United States

- St. Thomas' Episcopal Church
- U.S. National Register of Historic Places
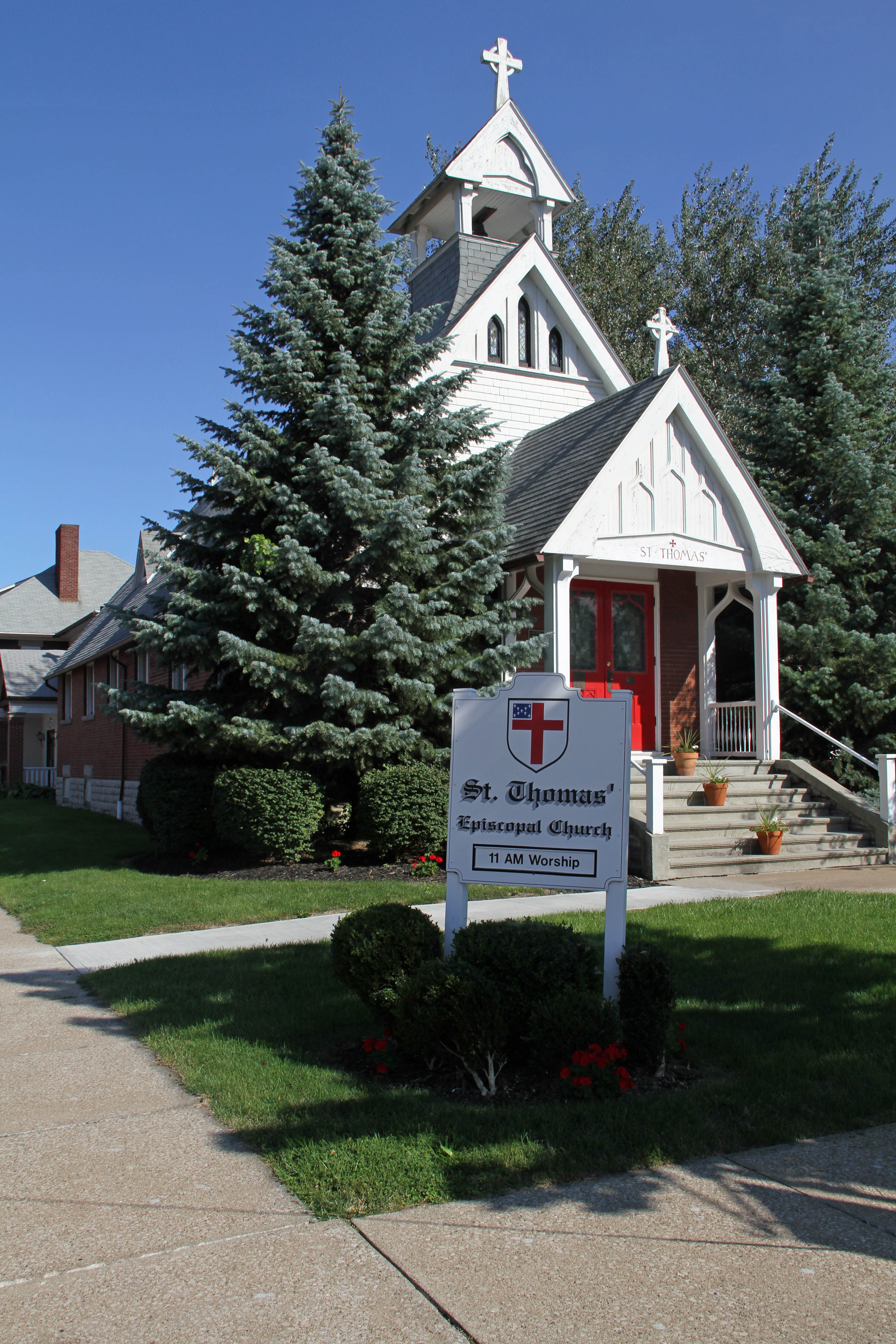

- Location within Ohio Location within the United States
- Location: 214 E. Second St., Port Clinton, Ohio
- Coordinates: 41°30′41″N 82°56′20″W
- Area: less than one acre
- Built: 1896
- Architect: Coburn, Barnum, Benes & Hubbell; Betsch, Edward
- Architectural style: Gothic Revival
- NRHP reference No.: 99000845
- Added to NRHP: July 15, 1999

St. Thomas' Episcopal Church is a parish in the Episcopal Diocese of Ohio. Its historic Gothic Revival style church, at 214 E. Second Street in Port Clinton, Ohio, was built in 1896. It was added to the National Register of Historic Places in 1999.

In 2017, the church reported 53 members; in 2023, it reported 49 members. No membership statistics were reported in 2024 national parochial reports. Plate and pledge financial support reported by the church in 2023 was $102,596. Average Sunday Attendance (ASA) reported in 2024 was 23 persons. This was a relative decrease on ASA of 29 in 2017.
