= Cairo, Ohio =

- Village
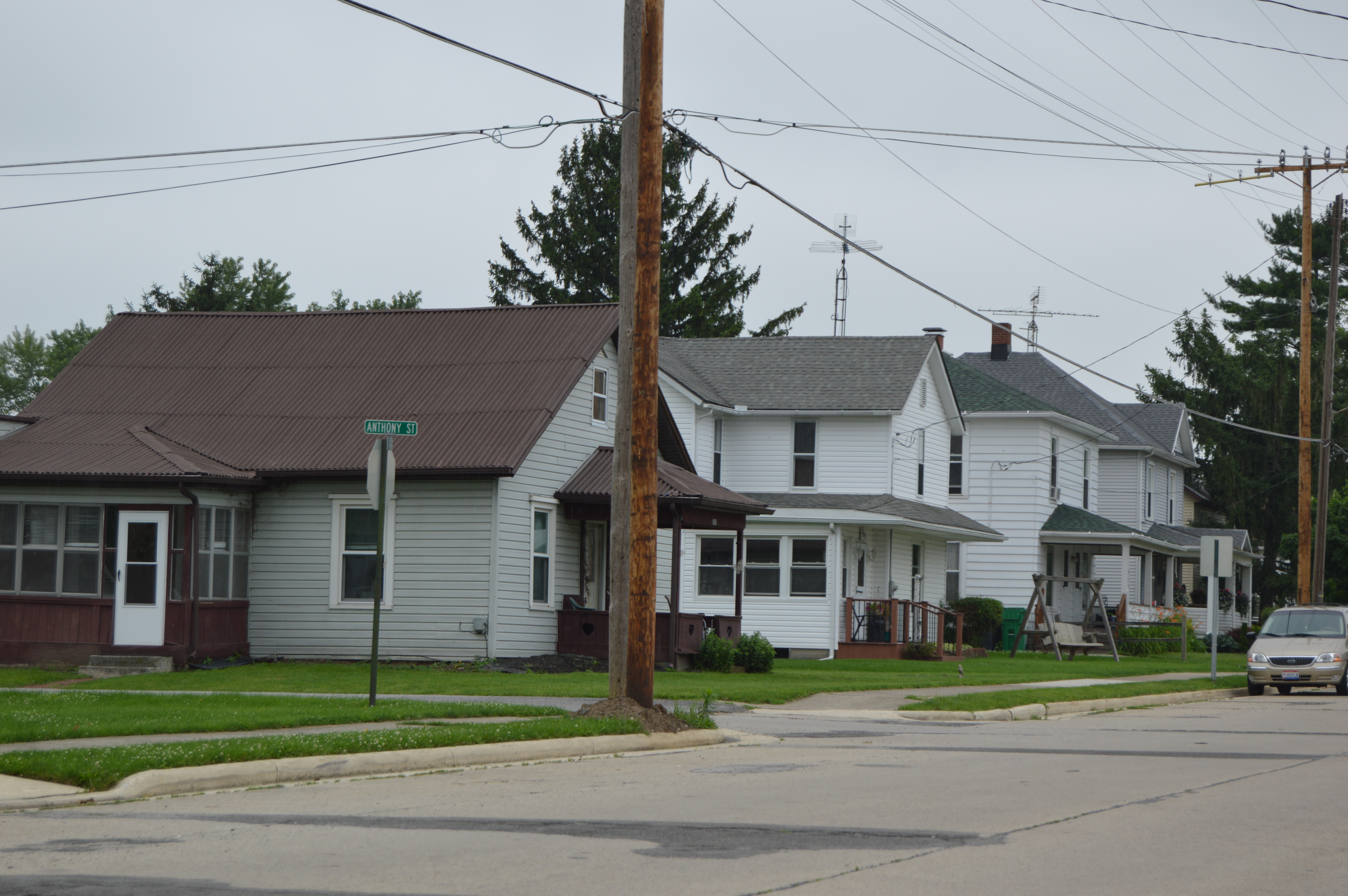
- Houses on Main Street

- Logo

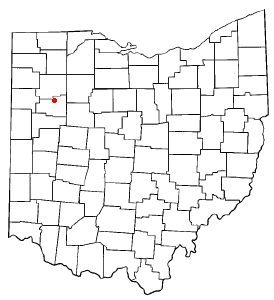
- Location of Cairo, Ohio

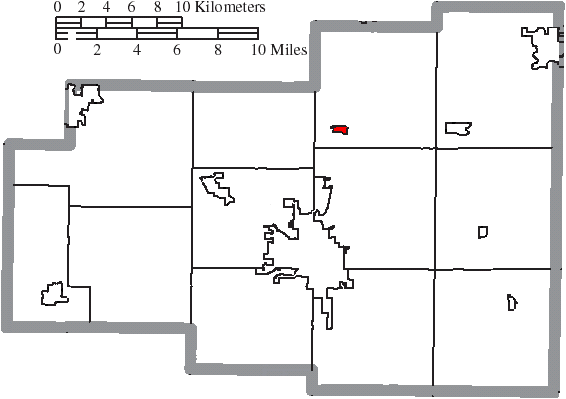
- Location of Cairo in Allen County
- Coordinates: 40°49′51″N 84°05′04″W
- Country: United States
- State: Ohio
- County: Allen
- Township: Monroe

Government
  - Mayor: John Vandemark

Area
  - Total: 0.28 sq mi (0.72 km^{2})
  - Land: 0.28 sq mi (0.72 km^{2})
  - Water: 0 sq mi (0.00 km^{2})
- Elevation: 814 ft (248 m)

Population (2020)
  - Total: 517
  - Estimate (2023): 502
  - Density: 1,866.4/sq mi (720.62/km^{2})
- Time zone: UTC-5 (Eastern (EST))
  - Summer (DST): UTC-4 (EDT)
- ZIP code: 45820
- Area code: 419
- FIPS code: 39-10884
- GNIS feature ID: 2397522
- Website: cairooh.org

Cairo (/ˈkɛəroʊ/ KAIR-oh) is a village in Allen County, Ohio, United States. As of the 2020 census it had a population of 517. It is included in the Lima Metropolitan Statistical Area.

== History ==
Cairo was originally called West Cairo, and under the latter name was platted in 1848. A post office called West Cairo was established in 1852, and the name was changed to Cairo in 1922.

== Geography ==
Cairo is located at the intersection of what was the east–west U.S. Route 30 (the Lincoln Highway) and the north–south State Route 65 ("Ottawa Road") in the middle of farming country. In the 1970s, Route 30 was upgraded and moved approximately one mile south of Cairo. Now, the east–west street in Cairo is Main Street. Cairo lies near the following city and towns:

- Lima, about six miles to the south on State Route 65
- Columbus Grove, about six miles to the north on State Route 65
- Gomer, about five miles to the west on the old Lincoln Highway route
- Beaverdam, about six miles to the east on the old Lincoln Highway route

The elevation of the land area of Cairo (ranges from about 812' at the west end to 842' at the east end of the village above sea level) is benchmarked at 815 feet (248 m) above sea level, generally flat and moderately wooded. The nearest stream with year-round flow is Rattlesnake Creek, which flows from south of the village and passes just to the west of the village. Water flow in the village is generally from the south and east to the north and west.

According to the United States Census Bureau, the village has a total area of 0.23 square miles (0.60 km^{2}), all land.

== Demographics ==
Historical population
Census	Pop.	Note	%±
1880	316		—
1890	325		2.8%
1900	338		4.0%
1910	386		14.2%
1920	380		−1.6%
1930	374		−1.6%
1940	440		17.6%
1950	505		14.8%
1960	566		12.1%
1970	587		3.7%
1980	596		1.5%
1990	473		−20.6%
2000	499		5.5%
2010	524		5.0%
2020	517		−1.3%
2023 (est.)	502	▼	−2.9%
U.S. Decennial Census

=== 2010 census ===
As of the census of 2010, there were 524 people, 198 households, and 150 families living in the village. The population density was 2,278.3 inhabitants per square mile (879.7/km^{2}). There were 214 housing units at an average density of 930.4 per square mile (359.2/km^{2}). The racial makeup of the village was 97.7% White, 0.6% African American, 0.2% Native American, 0.2% Asian, and 1.3% from two or more races. Hispanic or Latino of any race were 1.5% of the population.

There were 198 households, of which 37.9% had children under the age of 18 living with them, 58.1% were married couples living together, 14.1% had a female householder with no husband present, 3.5% had a male householder with no wife present, and 24.2% were non-families. 22.7% of all households were made up of individuals, and 11.1% had someone living alone who was 65 years of age or older. The average household size was 2.65 and the average family size was 3.10.

The median age in the village was 37.2 years. 28.2% of residents were under the age of 18; 7.7% were between the ages of 18 and 24; 24.1% were from 25 to 44; 27.2% were from 45 to 64; and 13% were 65 years of age or older. The gender makeup of the village was 46.6% male and 53.4% female.

=== 2000 census ===
As of the census of 2000, there were 499 people, 181 households, and 148 families living in the village. The population density was 2,064.0 inhabitants per square mile (796.9/km^{2}). There were 184 housing units at an average density of 761.1 per square mile (293.9/km^{2}). The racial makeup of the village was 98.60% White, 0.40% African American, 0.20% Asian, and 0.80% from two or more races. Hispanic or Latino of any race were 0.80% of the population.

There were 181 households, out of which 40.9% had children under the age of 18 living with them, 65.2% were married couples living together, 12.7% had a female householder with no husband present, and 18.2% were non-families. 15.5% of all households were made up of individuals, and 7.2% had someone living alone who was 65 years of age or older. The average household size was 2.76 and the average family size was 3.08.

In the village, the population was spread out, with 30.7% under the age of 18, 6.8% from 18 to 24, 31.5% from 25 to 44, 21.4% from 45 to 64, and 9.6% who were 65 years of age or older. The median age was 34 years. For every 100 females there were 92.7 males. For every 100 females age 18 and over, there were 90.1 males.

The median income for a household in the village was $32,917, and the median income for a family was $39,375. Males had a median income of $34,250 versus $25,313 for females. The per capita income for the village was $14,365. About 6.8% of families and 6.9% of the population were below the poverty line, including 11.4% of those under age 18 and 3.8% of those age 65 or over.

== Education ==
Cairo has a public library, a branch of the Allen County Library.

== Notable people ==
- Minnie Hartness (1867–1957), stenographer, writer, lecturer, and lady of letters
