= North Presbyterian Church (Cleveland) =

Historic church in Ohio, United States

- U.S. National Register of Historic Places
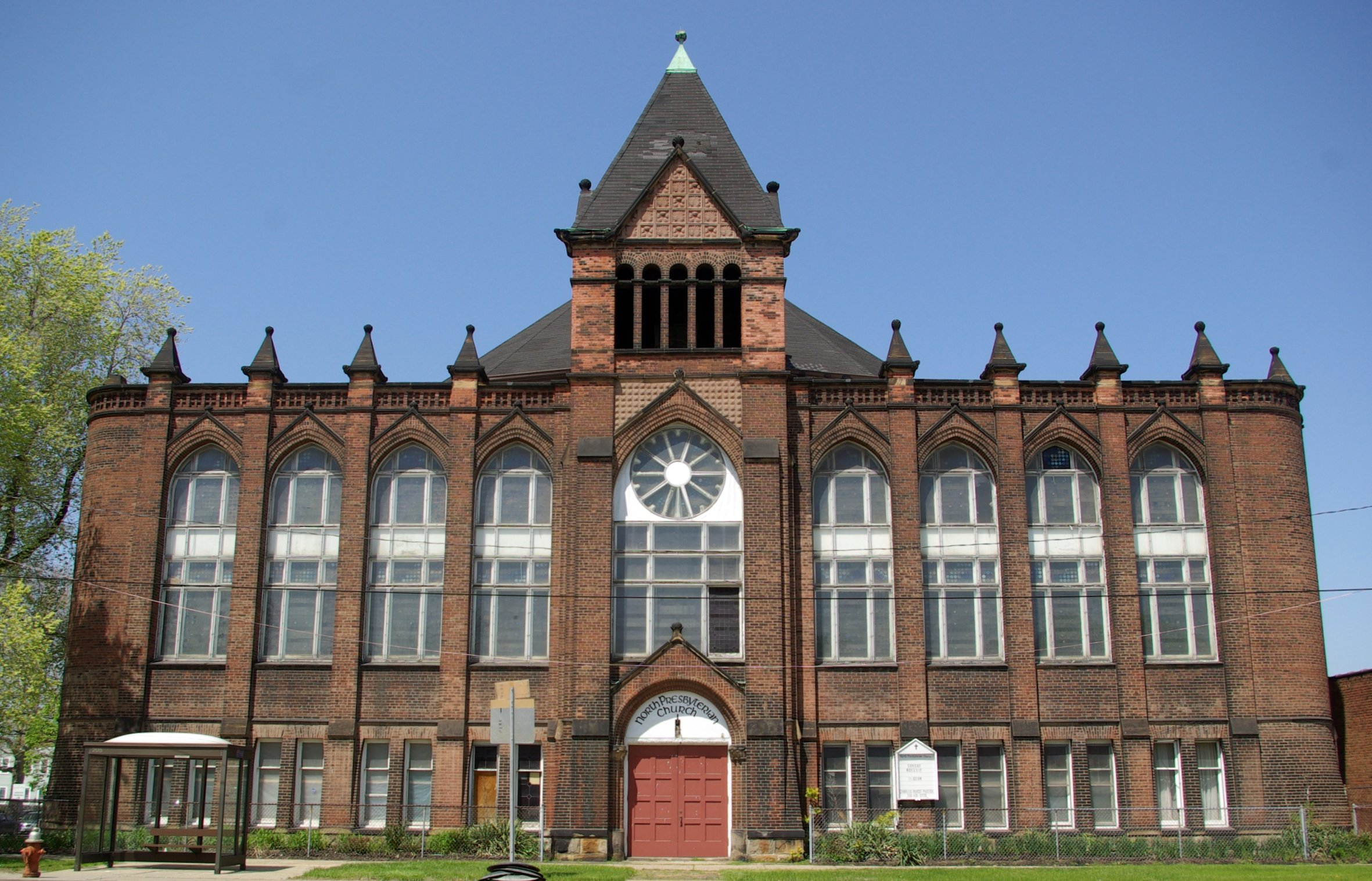
- Front of the church

- Location within Cleveland Location within Ohio Location within the United States
- Location: 4001 Superior Ave., Cleveland, Ohio
- Coordinates: 41°30′51″N 81°39′43″W
- Area: Less than 1 acre (0.40 ha)
- Built: 1887
- Architectural style: Gothic Revival, Romanesque Revival
- NRHP reference No.: 74001445
- Added to NRHP: October 29, 1974

North Presbyterian Church is a historic Presbyterian church on the east side of Cleveland, Ohio, United States. Constructed in the 1880s, the church building has been named a historic site.

Throughout its history, the congregation has been focused on Sunday school work. North Presbyterian Church developed out of a mission Sunday school established in east-side Cleveland in 1859. The local presbytery organized a congregation out of the Sunday school in 1867, and within a short while, the new congregation formed the first of two mission Sunday schools in other locations. When the present building was constructed, it was designed to facilitate Sunday schools, with small classrooms surrounding the sanctuary.

Members arranged for the present building to be erected in the mid-1880s: construction began in 1886 and continued into the following year. It is an eclectic structure, mixing Gothic Revival and Romanesque Revival design elements in an unusual manner. A central tower protrudes slightly from the rest of the facade; it is topped by a steep pyramidal roof. At the base of the tower is the main entrance, and small vertical windows shelter a belfry immediately below the base of the roof; a large window fills nearly all of the space between the main entrance and the belfry. On each side of the tower, the facade is divided into four bays by buttresses running from foundation to the roof, topped by steep pinnacles. Each bay includes two small windows at ground level and a massive window, similar to the one in the tower, that fills most of the width and height in the bay. The building's main corner (on the left from the perspective of someone facing the main entrance), facing an intersection along Superior Avenue, is rounded, and the design of the facade continues onto the western side.

In late 1974, North Presbyterian Church was listed on the National Register of Historic Places, qualifying both because of its architecture and because of its place in local history. Critical to this designation was the congregation's dedication to religious education, as seen both in its history and its architecture. The general design elements were unusual for period churches, and the floor plan that concentrated on the Sunday school space was highly distinctive; together, these themes caused the church to be a unique example of late nineteenth-century churches in the region.
