= Parker Hannifin Hall =

Coordinates: 41°30′06″N 81°40′24″W

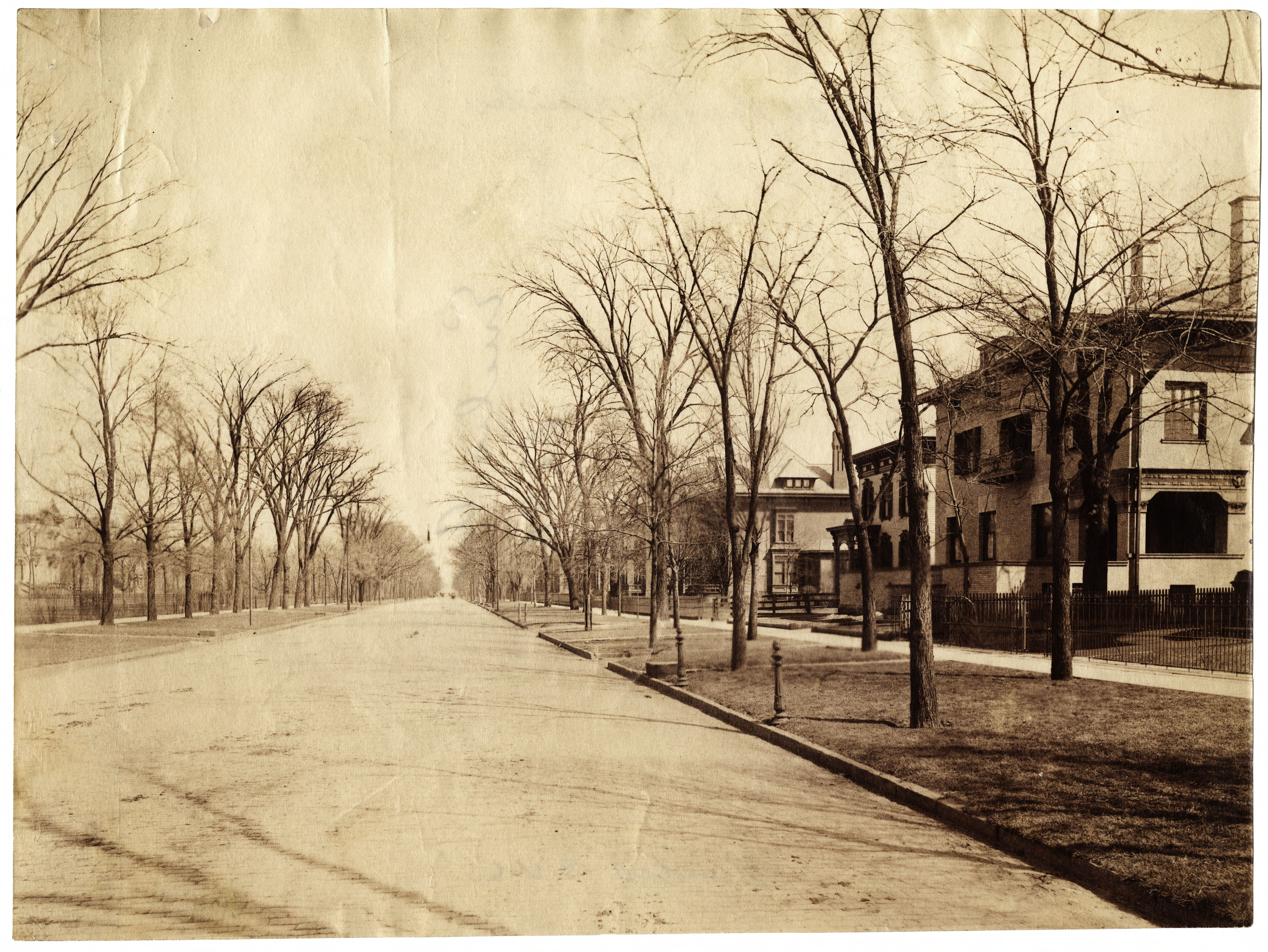
Historic photograph of Euclid Avenue, with the Howe mansion on the far right

Parker Hannifin Hall, formerly the George Howe residence/ George Howe mansion and also used as the Vixseboxse gallery, is a historic residence at 2258 Euclid Avenue in Cleveland, Ohio. It was acquired by Cleveland State University in 1982 and is used for offices. It is one of the few remaining homes from Millionaire's Row on Euclid Avenue.

== History of Parker Hannifin Hall ==
In 1894, Cleveland Police Commissioner and businessman George Howe built the George Howe Mansion, which would later become Parker Hannifin Hall. George Howe died in 1901 and Gage Gallery of Fine Arts established the mansion as a hub for the fine arts community in Cleveland. George Gage was the buying agent for Gage Gallery of Fine Arts and connected many wealthy Clevelanders with art. Many of these Clevelanders would later donate their art to the Cleveland Museum of Art. Following Gage’s death, the Vixseboxse Art Gallery operated the mansion for about 50 years before moving to Cleveland Heights. In 1983 Cleveland State University purchased the mansion and restored it using donations from private individuals and area corporations. Due to a large donation from the Parker-Hannifin Corporation, the mansion was renamed Parker Hannifin Hall in 2005. As of 2024, the mansion still lies on the south side of Millionaire’s Row as Cleveland State University’s College of Graduate Studies and the Office of Research and is one of the last surviving mansions from Millionaire’s Row.
