= Henry Hartness =

English footballer

Personal information
- Date of birth: 1888
- Place of birth: Newcastle upon Tyne, England
- Date of death: 1958 (aged 69–70)
- Place of death: Newcastle upon Tyne, England
- Height: 5 ft 10 1/2 in (1.79 m)
- Positions: Forward; half back

Senior career*
Years	Team	Apps	(Gls)
- Benwell Adelaide
	Sunderland	0	(0)
1911	Heart of Midlothian	1	(1)
- Scotswood
1912–1915	Croydon Common	25	(5)
- Scotswood
- * Club domestic league appearances and goals

Henry Hartness (1888–1958) was an English professional footballer who played as a forward and half back. He scored on his only appearance in the Scottish League for Heart of Midlothian.

== Career statistics ==
Appearances and goals by club, season and competition
Club	Season	League			National cup (Note: Includes FA Cup, Scottish Cup)		Total	
Club	Season	Division	Apps	Goals	Apps	Goals	Apps	Goals
Heart of Midlothian	1910–11	Scottish League First Division	1	1	0	0	1	1
Croydon Common	1912–13	Southern League Second Division	8	5	0	0	8	5
Croydon Common	1913–14	Southern League Second Division	1	0	0	0	1	0
Croydon Common	1914–15	Southern League First Division	16	0	1	0	17	0
Croydon Common	Total		25	5	1	0	26	5
Career total			26	6	1	0	27	6
