= National Register of Historic Places listings in Cleveland =

List of historic sites in Cleveland, Ohio, US

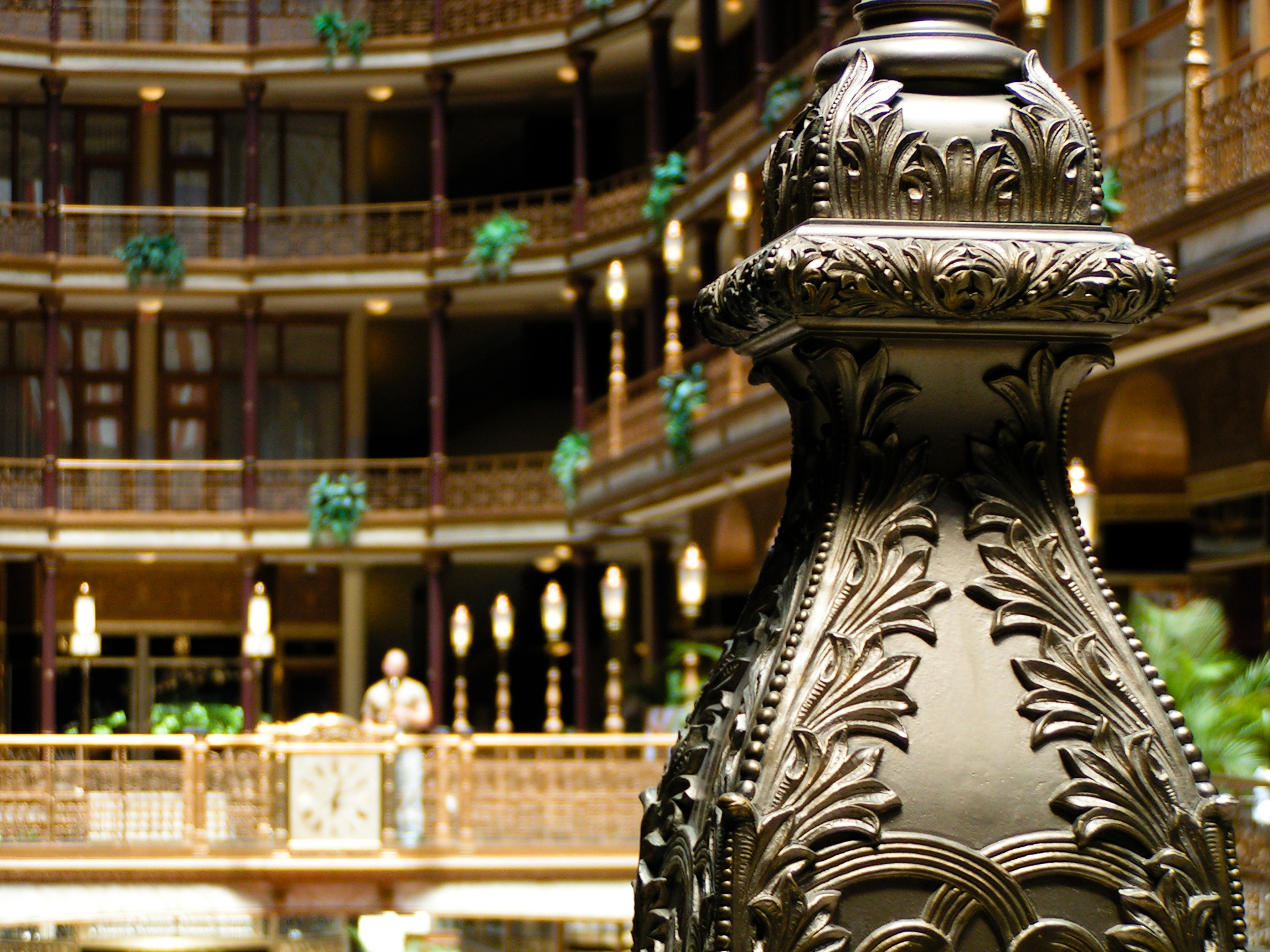
Interior of the Cleveland Arcade.

This is a list of the National Register of Historic Places listings in Cleveland, Ohio.

This is intended to be a complete list of the properties and districts on the National Register of Historic Places in Cleveland, Ohio, United States. Latitude and longitude coordinates are provided for many National Register properties and districts; these locations may be seen together in an online map.

There are 447 properties and districts listed on the National Register in Cuyahoga County, including 4 National Historic Landmarks. The city of Cleveland is the location of 285 of these properties and districts, including 3 of the National Historic Landmarks; they are listed here, while the remainder are listed separately. Four properties and districts are split between Cleveland and other parts of the county, and are thus included on both lists. Another 8 properties in Cleveland were once listed but have been removed.

This National Park Service list is complete through NPS recent listings posted November 6, 2026.

== Current listings ==
	Name on the Register	Image	Date listed	Location	Description
1	Adams-Bagnall Electric Co.- Cleveland Motorcycle Manufacturing Co.		October 29, 2026 (#100013565)	7299 Platt Avenue; 41°29′26″N 81°38′17″W	
2	Adelbert Hall	Adelbert Hall	October 30, 1973 (#73001405)	Case Western Reserve University campus 41°30′18″N 81°36′30″W	A Case Western Reserve University administration building built in 1881 to serve as the home of Western Reserve College. Designed by local architect Joseph Ireland in the Italianate, Romanesque, and Stick-Eastlake styles, it was named after Adelbert Stone, the drowned son of industrialist Amasa Stone. The building was gutted by a fire in June 1991, and restored in 1993.
3	Advent Evangelical Lutheran Church		June 22, 2026 (#100013149)	15309 Harvard Avenue; 41°27′00″N 81°34′26″W	
4	Allen Memorial Medical Library	Allen Memorial Medical Library	November 30, 1982 (#82001365)	11000 Euclid Ave. 41°30′22″N 81°36′31″W	A Case Western Reserve University building on Euclid Avenue, designed in the Neoclassical Revival style by the Cleveland firm of Walker and Weeks and completed in 1926.
5	Alta Public Library	Alta Public Library	October 4, 2005 (#05001143)	12510 Mayfield Rd. 41°30′29″N 81°35′46″W	This 1914 Neoclassical addition to Alta House (completed in 1899) was designed by George B. Post of New York City. Alta House burned in 1980 and was demolished in 1981, but the library survived undamaged. A new, smaller Alta House was finished in 1982, and the library underwent a major renovation in 2016.
6	Ansel Road Apartment Buildings Historic District	Ansel Road Apartment Buildings Historic District	July 2, 2008 (#08000589)	1588 Ansel Rd to 9501 Wade Park Ave. 41°30′53″N 81°37′12″W	Four apartment buildings (six structures) on Ansel Road between Talbot and Wade Park Avenue, and one apartment building (two structures) on Wade Park Avenue, built overlooking Rockefeller Park between 1910 and 1928. Large and small buildings, for the wealthy and the working class, in a wide range of architectural styles are outstanding examples of early 20th century apartment living.
7	Archwood Avenue Historic District	Archwood Avenue Historic District	March 19, 1987 (#87000428)	Archwood Ave. roughly bounded by W. 31st Pl. and W. 37th St. 41°27′10″N 81°42′25″W	
8	Archwood Congregational Church	Archwood Congregational Church	May 13, 1994 (#94000416)	2800 Archwood Ave. 41°27′11″N 81°42′11″W	
9	Arnold Wooden Ware Co.-Arnold Wholesale Corp. Building		April 1, 2024 (#100009173)	5207 Detroit Ave. 41°29′09″N 81°43′22″W	
10	The Astrup Company Building	The Astrup Company Building	August 31, 2018 (#100002875)	2937 W. 25th St. 41°28′20″N 81°41′54″W	
11	Audubon School		July 18, 2022 (#100007904)	3055 Martin Luther King Jr. Dr. 41°28′31″N 81°36′35″W	
12	Baker Motor Vehicle Company Building	Baker Motor Vehicle Company Building	February 21, 2007 (#07000071)	7100-7122 Euclid Ave. 41°30′14″N 81°38′21″W	1910 electric automobile luxury showroom, garage, and repair facility designed by local architect Frank B. Meade and erected by the Baker Electric Motor Vehicle Company. A mix of Early Commercial and Mission Revival architecture, it was restored in 2008 and is now a startup business incubator.
13	Beehive School	Beehive School	April 5, 1984 (#84002910)	4345 Lee Rd. 41°26′06″N 81°33′53″W	Demolished about 2009.
14	Dr. James Bell House	Dr. James Bell House	October 16, 1986 (#86002878)	1822 E. 89th St. 41°30′28″N 81°37′30″W	A 1901 Richardsonian Romanesque home in the Hough neighborhood designed by local architect George J. Hardway. It epitomizes the local reaction against the excesses of Victorian architecture.
15	Sarah Benedict House	Sarah Benedict House	November 1, 1984 (#84000220)	3751 Prospect Ave. 41°30′08″N 81°39′41″W	
16	Bingham Company Warehouse	Bingham Company Warehouse	November 2, 1973 (#73001406)	1278 W. 9th St. 41°29′56″N 81°42′05″W	Designed by Walker and Weeks and completed in 1916, this was formerly the largest single-unit warehouse in the world. It is an exemplar of the Commercial style of architecture. It was converted into The Bingham apartments in 2001.
17	H. Black and Company Building	H. Black and Company Building	January 24, 2002 (#01001523)	1900 Superior Avenue; 41°30′24″N 81°40′45″W	Clothing manufacturing factory constructed in 1907 and designed by New York City architect Robert D. Kohn, this Mission Revival building was once a nationally-known model for beauty and worker comfort. It is now known as the Tower Press Building. It underwent a renovation in 2003.
18	Body Block	Body Block	September 18, 1998 (#98001178)	4925-4955 Payne Ave., 1692-1696 E. 55th St. 41°30′46″N 81°39′09″W	Likely designed by local architect George Smith, this Queen Anne style block of apartments has an interior arcade and ground-floor retail. It anchored a major intersection in Goodrich–Kirtland Park for half a century. The structure underwent historic preservation and renovation from 1994 to 1995.
19	Bohemian National Hall	Bohemian National Hall	May 28, 1975 (#75001359)	4939 Broadway St. 41°28′20″N 81°39′23″W	Erected by 40 Czech cultural societies in 1896, this building, a mix of Renaissance Revival and Romanesque Revival architecture designed by the local firm of Steffens & Searles, was designed to serve the cultural, political, and social needs of Cleveland's Czech community. (At the time, Cleveland had the fourth-largest Czech population of any city in the world, behind Prague, Vienna, and Chicago).
20	Bomante House	Bomante House	March 19, 1987 (#87000441)	3000 Mapledale Ave. 41°27′17″N 81°42′09″W	This 1905 Swiss Chalet Revival style house was built for Frederick W. Bomonti, a famous Swiss American restaurateur in Cleveland. It is an exemplar of the type of architecture favored by Swiss Americans, a large and influential immigrant group in Cleveland in the late 1800s.
21	Broadway Avenue Historic District	Broadway Avenue Historic District	October 19, 1988 (#88001860)	Broadway Ave. and E. 55th St. 41°28′02″N 81°39′05″W	Historic district of 43 buildings constructed between 1888 and 1930. The district runs on Broadway between Cable and Barkwill Avenues, and on E. 55th Street between Lufkin and Broadway Avenues, with a few buildings to either side. It is the heart of the Czech community in Cleveland, and was once the second largest shopping district in the city.
22	Brooklyn Bank Building	Brooklyn Bank Building	July 19, 1984 (#84002912)	3764 W. 25th St. 41°27′08″N 81°42′07″W	1904 bank building in an eclectic mix of styles, designed by noted local architect J. Milton Dyer during his most prolific, creative period. It is a contributing property to the Archwood Avenue Historic District and to the Brooklyn Centre Historic District, and is listed on the NRHP independently as well.
23	Brooklyn Centre Historic District	Brooklyn Centre Historic District	March 4, 1999 (#99000238)	Roughly bounded by Interstate 71, Pearl Rd., and Big Creek Valley; 41°27′05″N 81°42′31″W	
24	Brownell School and Annex	Brownell School and Annex	February 1, 2006 (#05001576)	1300-1360 Sumner St. 41°29′52″N 81°40′49″W	Three brick public school buildings in the Queen Anne style, completed in 1885 (John Eisenmann), 1905 (Frank Seymour Barnum), and 1909 (Barnum). Several nationally and locally famous individuals were educated there, and it was the first home of Tri-C. The complex was sold to private investors in 1979, and underwent a significant interior remodel into office space from 1983 to 1985.
25	Bruce-Macbeth Engine Company	Bruce-Macbeth Engine Company	February 14, 2018 (#100002120)	2111 Center St. 41°29′41″N 81°42′20″W	
26	Bryant Building	Bryant Building	December 11, 2014 (#14001051)	1261 Superior Ave. 41°30′15″N 81°41′08″W	Automobile salesroom and service center built by Mall Motor Co. in 1921 and designed by the local architectural firm of Christian, Schwarzenburg and Gaede. It was sold to Bryant Motor Co. in 1922, from which the building draws its name. The structure was significantly renovated by Masthead Brewing in 2016.
27	Buckeye Commercial Historic District		August 23, 2024 (#100010698)	11132-12814 Buckeye Road, 2871, 2884 E 116th Street; 2846 E 118th Street; 41°28′52″N 81°36′15″W	
28	Building at 3101 Euclid Avenue	Building at 3101 Euclid Avenue	August 7, 2017 (#100001438)	3101 Euclid Avenue; 41°30′10″N 81°40′00″W	
29	Calvary Presbyterian Church	Calvary Presbyterian Church	February 3, 2025 (#100011407)	7812 Euclid Ave; 41°30′13″N 81°38′02″W	
30	Caxton Building	Caxton Building	October 30, 1973 (#73001407)	812 Huron Rd., SE. 41°29′54″N 81°41′10″W	
31	Cedar Branch Young Men's Christian Association (YMCA)		August 26, 2024 (#100010710)	7515 Cedar Avenue; 41°30′01″N 81°38′07″W	
32	Cedar Glen Apartments	Cedar Glen Apartments	June 17, 1994 (#94000594)	11424-11432 Cedar Glen Parkway; 41°29′57″N 81°36′15″W	A Georgian Revival luxury apartment building completed in 1927 on a bluff overlooking Cedar Glen Parkway. Designed by Samuel H. Weis (a.k.a. Samuel H. White), it was saved from demolition in 1993 and converted to condominiums.
33	Central YMCA	Central YMCA	November 1, 1984 (#84000221)	2200 Prospect Ave. 41°29′59″N 81°40′26″W	
34	Cermak Building	Cermak Building	October 18, 1984 (#84000128)	3503 E. 93rd St. 41°27′48″N 81°37′16″W	
35	Church of the Holy Spirit-Nazarene Baptist Church		December 18, 2025 (#100012414)	8411-8415 Wade Park Avenue; 41°30′57″N 81°37′44″W	
36	Cleveland Arcade	Cleveland Arcade	March 20, 1973 (#73001408)	401 Euclid Ave. 41°29′58″N 81°41′36″W	
37	Cleveland Centre Historic District	Cleveland Centre Historic District	January 22, 2014 (#13001117)	Roughly bounded by James and Riverbed Sts. and the Cuyahoga River; 41°29′39″N 81°42′05″W	
38	Cleveland Club	Cleveland Club	February 28, 2008 (#08000113)	10660 Carnegie Ave. 41°30′02″N 81°36′47″W	
39	Cleveland Dental Manufacturing Company Building	Cleveland Dental Manufacturing Company Building	September 3, 2004 (#04000936)	3307 Scranton Rd. 41°27′52″N 81°41′53″W	
40	Cleveland Discount Building	Cleveland Discount Building	October 2, 1991 (#91001416)	815 Superior Ave., NE. 41°30′10″N 81°41′24″W	
41	Cleveland East Pierhead Light	Cleveland East Pierhead Light	December 19, 1991 (#91001855)	Eastern breakwater pierhead, entrance to Cleveland harbor 41°30′37″N 81°42′55″W	
42	Cleveland Grays Armory	Cleveland Grays Armory	March 28, 1973 (#73001409)	1234 Bolivar Rd. 41°29′56″N 81°40′56″W	
43	Cleveland Harbor Station, U.S. Coast Guard	Cleveland Harbor Station, U.S. Coast Guard	January 1, 1976 (#76001390)	New West Pier; 41°30′11″N 81°42′46″W	
44	Cleveland Home for Aged Colored People	Cleveland Home for Aged Colored People	December 17, 1982 (#82001366)	4807 Cedar Ave. 41°30′02″N 81°39′14″W	
45	Cleveland Jewish Center-Cory United Methodist Church	Cleveland Jewish Center-Cory United Methodist Church	April 17, 2023 (#100008829)	1117 East 105th St. 41°31′35″N 81°36′55″W	
46	Cleveland Mall	Cleveland Mall	June 10, 1975 (#75001360)	Roughly T-shaped mall area between E. 9th and W. 3rd Sts. 41°30′14″N 81°41′36″W	
47	Cleveland Masonic Temple	Cleveland Masonic Temple	August 17, 2001 (#01000894)	3615 Euclid Ave. 41°30′13″N 81°39′44″W	
48	Cleveland Municipal Stadium	Cleveland Municipal Stadium	November 13, 1987 (#87002287)	Erieview Dr. 41°30′24″N 81°41′50″W	Demolished from November 1996 to March 1997
49	Cleveland Packard Building	Cleveland Packard Building	November 1, 1984 (#84000222)	5100-5206 Prospect Ave. 41°30′09″N 81°39′11″W	
50	Cleveland Public Carnegie Library Hough Branch	Cleveland Public Carnegie Library Hough Branch	September 6, 2016 (#16000603)	1765 Crawford Rd. 41°30′32″N 81°37′38″W	
51	Cleveland Public Square	Cleveland Public Square	December 18, 1975 (#75001361)	Superior Ave. and Ontario St. 41°29′59″N 81°41′38″W	
52	Cleveland State University-University Tower	Cleveland State University-University Tower	September 18, 2023 (#100009325)	1860 East 22nd St. 41°30′12″N 81°40′32″W	AKA the Rhodes Tower
53	Cleveland Trust Company	Cleveland Trust Company	November 26, 1973 (#73001410)	900 Euclid Ave. at E. 9th St. 41°30′00″N 81°41′09″W	1907 bank building designed by George B. Post featuring a striking glass rotunda, a tympanum sculpture, and interior murals. Interior renovated after 2013 into a grocery store and nightclub.
54	Cleveland Warehouse District	Cleveland Warehouse District	September 30, 1982 (#82003558)	Roughly bounded by Front and Superior Aves. and Railroad, Summit, 3rd, and 10th Sts.; also 1384-1410 W. 10th St. 41°30′00″N 81°42′03″W	10th St. addresses represent a boundary increase of February 21, 2007
55	Cleveland West Pierhead Light	Cleveland West Pierhead Light	August 4, 1983 (#83001950)	Cleveland Harbor on Lake Erie; 41°30′32″N 81°43′04″W	
56	Cleveland Worsted Mills Company	Cleveland Worsted Mills Company	August 8, 1985 (#85001695)	5846-6116 Broadway; 41°27′53″N 81°38′57″W	Destroyed by fire, July 4, 1993
57	Clinton Apartments	Clinton Apartments	March 29, 2006 (#06000199)	3607 Clinton Ave. 41°29′13″N 81°42′50″W	
58	Colonial and Euclid Arcades	Colonial and Euclid Arcades	May 8, 1987 (#87000660)	508 and 600 Euclid Ave. 41°29′56″N 81°41′21″W	
59	The Commodore Hotel	The Commodore Hotel	September 2, 2016 (#16000594)	11990 Ford Dr.; 11309-11325 Euclid Ave. 41°30′32″N 81°36′21″W	
60	Consolidated Fruit Auction Company Building	Consolidated Fruit Auction Company Building	August 17, 2021 (#100006833)	601 Stone's Levee; 41°29′31″N 81°41′31″W	
61	Cook Building	Cook Building	November 1, 1984 (#84000224)	4600-4800 Prospect Ave. 41°30′08″N 81°39′18″W	
62	Corlett Building	Corlett Building	October 29, 2003 (#03001101)	1923-35 Euclid Ave. 41°30′06″N 81°40′39″W	Demolished
63	The Courtland	The Courtland	November 2, 2000 (#00001296)	5403 Detroit Ave. 41°29′07″N 81°43′28″W	
64	Justus L. Cozad House	Justus L. Cozad House	January 18, 1974 (#74001435)	11508 Mayfield Rd. 41°30′29″N 81°36′11″W	
65	Crawford-Tilden Apartments	Crawford-Tilden Apartments	March 21, 1978 (#78002038)	1831-1843 Crawford Rd. and 1878-1888 E. 84th St. 41°30′25″N 81°37′45″W	The structure, built in 1908, is notable partially because of the way it is situated on a triangular piece of land, not unlike the Flatiron Building.
66	Andrew Dall, Jr., and James Dall Houses	Andrew Dall, Jr., and James Dall Houses	July 19, 1984 (#84002913)	2225 and 2229 E. 46th St. 41°29′52″N 81°39′14″W	
67	Detroit-Superior High Level Bridge	Detroit-Superior High Level Bridge	January 18, 1974 (#74001437)	Over the Cuyahoga River valley between Detroit Ave. and Superior Ave. 41°29′39″N 81°42′09″W	
68	Division Avenue Pumping Station	Division Avenue Pumping Station	January 18, 1974 (#74001438)	Division Ave., at the foot of W. 45th St. 41°29′24″N 81°43′00″W	
69	Dixon Hall Apartments	Dixon Hall Apartments	November 1, 1984 (#84000225)	3814 Prospect Ave. 41°30′06″N 81°39′36″W	
70	Doan School	Doan School	August 23, 1984 (#84002915)	1350 E. 105th St. 41°31′13″N 81°36′58″W	
71	Dunham Tavern	Dunham Tavern	July 25, 1974 (#74001439)	6709 Euclid Ave. 41°30′17″N 81°38′19″W	
72	East 89th Street Historic District	East 89th Street Historic District	May 26, 1988 (#88000678)	E. 89th St. roughly between Chester and Hough Aves. 41°30′30″N 81°37′31″W	
73	East Boulevard Apartment House	East Boulevard Apartment House	August 24, 2017 (#100001506)	2691 E. 116th St. 41°29′09″N 81°36′09″W	
74	East Boulevard Historic District	East Boulevard Historic District	November 29, 1995 (#95001366)	Roughly bounded by East Boulevard, St. Clair Ave., E. 99th St. and University Cir. 41°31′27″N 81°37′16″W	
75	East Fourth Street Historic District	East Fourth Street Historic District	July 9, 1987 (#87001179)	Roughly on E. 4th St. between Euclid and Prospect Aves. 41°29′57″N 81°41′24″W	
76	The East Ohio Building	The East Ohio Building	January 23, 2013 (#12001212)	1717 E. 9th St. 41°30′08″N 81°41′17″W	
77	East Ohio Gas Company Building	East Ohio Gas Company Building	February 20, 2003 (#03000043)	1403 E. 6th St. 41°30′09″N 81°41′29″W	
78	Emmanuel Baptist Church		December 3, 2025 (#100012357)	7901 Quincy Ave. 41°29′37″N 81°38′00″W	
79	Empire Junior High School		July 7, 2023 (#100009088)	9113 Parmelee Ave. 41°31′56″N 81°37′26″W	
80	Jeremiah Ensworth House	Jeremiah Ensworth House	November 1, 1984 (#84000226)	3214 Prospect Ave. 41°30′04″N 81°39′50″W	
81	Erie Railroad Cleveland Powerhouse	Erie Railroad Cleveland Powerhouse	July 19, 1984 (#84003614)	1246 River Rd. 41°29′47″N 81°42′42″W	Demolished May 2014
82	Erie Street Cemetery Historic District	Erie Street Cemetery Historic District	September 16, 2024 (#100010810)	2301 East 9th Street; 41°29′52″N 81°40′54″W	
83	Erieview Historic District		February 1, 2021 (#100006084)	Roughly bounded by Lakeside Ave., Chester Ave., East 9th St., and East 12th St. 41°30′13″N 81°41′18″W	
84	Erieview Tower	Erieview Tower	September 25, 2017 (#100001655)	1322 E. 12th St. 41°30′19″N 81°41′18″W	
85	Euclid Avenue Christian Church	Euclid Avenue Christian Church	February 10, 2022 (#100007415)	9990 Euclid Ave. 41°30′12″N 81°37′09″W	1908 Romanesque Revival church built by Disciples of Christ. Sold to East Mt. Zion Baptist Church in 1955.
86	Euclid Avenue Historic District	Euclid Avenue Historic District	June 28, 2002 (#02000702)	Roughly bounded by Public Square, Euclid Ave. to E. 17th St., and E. 21st St.; also 205 St. Clair Ave., 1370 Ontario St., and 1796-1808 E. 13th St.; also 1835 to 1937 Prospect Ave. East; 41°30′02″N 81°41′12″W	Second set of addresses represents a boundary increase of May 29, 2007; third set represents a boundary increase approved June 24, 2022.
87	Euclid Avenue Presbyterian Church	Euclid Avenue Presbyterian Church	March 12, 1980 (#80002977)	11205 Euclid Ave. 41°30′30″N 81°36′27″W	
88	Euclid Avenue Temple-Liberty Hill Baptist Church	Euclid Avenue Temple-Liberty Hill Baptist Church	January 11, 2024 (#100009713)	8206 Euclid Avenue; 41°30′13″N 81°37′51″W	
89	The Euclid-Seventy-First Street Building	The Euclid-Seventy-First Street Building	August 8, 1996 (#96000866)	7002-7030 Euclid Ave. 41°30′15″N 81°38′25″W	
90	Fairhill Road Village Historic District	Fairhill Road Village Historic District	May 10, 1990 (#90000758)	12309-12511 Fairhill Rd. 41°29′36″N 81°35′47″W	Extends into Cleveland Heights, elsewhere in Cuyahoga County
91	Fairmont Creamery Company Ice Cream Building	Fairmont Creamery Company Ice Cream Building	February 23, 2015 (#15000038)	1720 Willey Ave. and 2306 W. 17th St. 41°28′50″N 81°41′45″W	
92	Federal Knitting Mills Building	Federal Knitting Mills Building	January 16, 2001 (#00001662)	2860-2894 Detroit Ave.; also 2820 and 2811-21 Vermont Ave. 41°29′20″N 81°42′49″W	Vermont Ave. addresses represent a boundary increase of February 1, 2006
93	Federal Reserve Bank of Cleveland	Federal Reserve Bank of Cleveland	October 8, 1976 (#76001392)	E. 6th St. and Superior Ave. 41°30′06″N 81°41′26″W	
94	Fellowship Missionary Baptist Church	Fellowship Missionary Baptist Church	January 17, 2025 (#100011262)	1754 E. 55th Street; 41°30′40″N 81°39′07″W	
95	Fenway Hall	Fenway Hall	December 13, 2016 (#16000845)	1986 Stokes Boulevard; 41°30′14″N 81°36′48″W	13-story Georgian Revival residential hotel completed in 1923. It is the last surviving building of the Doan's Corners commercial and entertainment district.
96	First Church of Christ, Scientist	First Church of Christ, Scientist	February 20, 2003 (#03000042)	2200 Overlook Rd. 41°30′12″N 81°35′58″W	
97	First Evangelical Church - Greater Friendship Baptist Church		January 7, 2026 (#100012510)	12305 Arlington Avenue; 41°32′03″N 81°35′59″W	
98	First Methodist Church	First Methodist Church	September 1, 1995 (#84003953)	3000 Euclid Ave. 41°30′08″N 81°40′01″W	
99	Ford Motor Company Cleveland Plant	Ford Motor Company Cleveland Plant	March 17, 1976 (#76001393)	11610 Euclid Ave. 41°30′38″N 81°36′10″W	
100	Forest City Bank Building	Forest City Bank Building	August 31, 1992 (#86003827)	1400 W. 25th St. 41°29′28″N 81°42′27″W	
101	Forest City Brewery	Forest City Brewery	May 3, 1976 (#76001394)	6920-6922 Union Ave. 41°27′47″N 81°38′24″W	
102	Franklin Boulevard Historic District	Franklin Boulevard Historic District	May 31, 1989 (#89000430)	Franklin Boulevard from W. 52nd to W. 38th Sts. 41°29′08″N 81°42′56″W	
103	Franklin Boulevard-West Clinton Avenue Historic District	Franklin Boulevard-West Clinton Avenue Historic District	December 6, 1993 (#93001334)	5207-7625 Franklin Boulevard and 5802-7325 W. Clinton Ave.; also 6801-7003 and 7319-7405 Detroit Ave. 41°28′55″N 81°43′46″W	Detroit Avenue represents a boundary increase of December 5, 2006
104	Phillip Gaensslen House	Phillip Gaensslen House	November 1, 1984 (#84000227)	3050 Prospect Ave. 41°30′03″N 81°39′58″W	
105	Garfield Memorial	Garfield Memorial	April 11, 1973 (#73001411)	12316 Euclid Ave. in Lake View Cemetery; 41°30′36″N 81°35′29″W	Extends into Cleveland Heights, elsewhere in Cuyahoga County
106	Dr. William Gifford House	Dr. William Gifford House	November 1, 1984 (#84000228)	3047 Prospect Ave. 41°30′05″N 81°39′58″W	
107	Francis K. Glidden House	Francis K. Glidden House	February 8, 1988 (#88000054)	1901 Ford Dr. 41°30′40″N 81°36′30″W	
108	Globe Iron Works Building	Globe Iron Works Building	March 17, 1994 (#94000245)	2320 Center St. 41°29′45″N 81°42′32″W	
109	Globe Machine and Stamping Company	Globe Machine and Stamping Company	January 14, 2013 (#12001180)	1250 W. 76th St. 41°29′11″N 81°44′17″W	
110	Jacob Goldsmith House	Jacob Goldsmith House	March 8, 1978 (#78002039)	2200 E. 40th St. 41°29′53″N 81°39′26″W	Demolished in January 1989 after arson two months prior
111	Gordon Square Building	Gordon Square Building	April 30, 1985 (#85000944)	6500-6616 Detroit Ave. and 1396-1490 W. 65th St. 41°29′03″N 81°43′51″W	
112	Gordon Square Historic District	Gordon Square Historic District	October 25, 2002 (#02001209)	Detroit Ave. and W. 65th St. 41°29′02″N 81°43′50″W	
113	Greater Abyssinia Baptist Church	Greater Abyssinia Baptist Church	February 2, 2026 (#100012684)	1161 E. 105th St. 41°31′32″N 81°36′55″W	
114	Greyhound Bus Station	Greyhound Bus Station	June 2, 1999 (#91000302)	1465 Chester Ave. 41°30′12″N 81°40′56″W	
115	Grossman Paper Box Company	Grossman Paper Box Company	August 15, 2016 (#16000601)	1729 Superior Ave. 41°30′23″N 81°40′52″W	
116	Halle Building	Halle Building	September 8, 1983 (#83001953)	1228 Euclid Ave. 41°30′00″N 81°40′59″W	
117	Halle's Shaker Square	Halle's Shaker Square	February 9, 2005 (#05000029)	13000 Shaker Boulevard; 41°29′00″N 81°35′32″W	
118	Harp Apartments	Harp Apartments	March 9, 2000 (#00000180)	1389 W. 64th St. 41°29′05″N 81°43′45″W	
119	Harvard School	Harvard School	May 22, 2002 (#02000550)	6900 Harvard Ave. 41°26′54″N 81°38′28″W	
120	Nathaniel Hawthorne Elementary School		July 11, 2022 (#100007884)	3575 West 130th St. 41°27′25″N 81°46′46″W	
121	Hay-McKinney and Bingham-Hanna House	Hay-McKinney and Bingham-Hanna House	June 18, 1976 (#76001395)	10825 E. Boulevard; 41°30′48″N 81°36′38″W	
122	Herold Building	Herold Building	January 29, 2013 (#12001245)	310 Prospect Ave. 41°29′53″N 81°41′25″W	
123	Hessler Court Wooden Pavement	Hessler Court Wooden Pavement	March 3, 1975 (#75001362)	11330 East Boulevard between Bellflower and Hessler Rds. 41°30′39″N 81°36′20″W	
124	James Hill House	James Hill House	May 13, 1994 (#94000415)	1840 W. 58th St. 41°28′54″N 81°43′36″W	
125	Hilliard Apartment Building	Hilliard Apartment Building	March 17, 1987 (#86003502)	2804-2906 Sackett Ave. 41°27′49″N 81°42′06″W	
126	Holy Rosary Church	Holy Rosary Church	June 16, 1976 (#76001397)	12021 Mayfield Rd. 41°30′32″N 81°35′56″W	
127	Hotel Statler	Hotel Statler	April 1, 1998 (#98000317)	1127 Euclid Ave. 41°30′02″N 81°41′06″W	
128	House of Wills	House of Wills	December 17, 1982 (#82001367)	2491 E. 55th St. 41°29′26″N 81°39′06″W	
129	Hoyt Block	Hoyt Block	January 18, 1974 (#74001440)	608 W. St. Clair St. 41°29′59″N 81°41′56″W	
130	Hruby Conservatory of Music	Hruby Conservatory of Music	November 29, 1979 (#79001807)	5417 Broadway St. 41°28′05″N 81°39′07″W	
131	Hubbard Cooke Block	Hubbard Cooke Block	December 22, 2014 (#14001073)	2206-2220 Superior Viaduct; 41°29′36″N 81°42′22″W	
132	Joseph Ireland House	Joseph Ireland House	November 1, 1984 (#84000229)	2074 E. 36th St. 41°30′03″N 81°39′46″W	Demolished
133	Irishtown Bend Archeological District	Irishtown Bend Archeological District	May 25, 1990 (#90000757)	Western bank of the Cuyahoga River, along Riverbed Rd. 41°29′22″N 81°42′18″W	
134	Jennings Apartments	Jennings Apartments	March 29, 1984 (#84003618)	2711 W. 14th St. 41°28′30″N 81°41′29″W	
135	Jones Home for Children	Jones Home for Children	August 30, 1996 (#87002636)	3518 W. 25th St. 41°27′30″N 81°42′06″W	
136	Jones Home Subdivisions Historic District	Jones Home Subdivisions Historic District	February 17, 2012 (#12000031)	Woodbridge, Marvin, Daisy, and Library Aves., and W. 25th St. 41°27′34″N 81°42′20″W	
137	The Joseph and Feiss Clothcraft Shops	The Joseph and Feiss Clothcraft Shops	October 28, 2010 (#10000873)	2149 W. 53rd St. 41°28′23″N 81°43′14″W	
138	Karamu House	Karamu House	December 17, 1982 (#82001368)	2355 E. 89th St. 41°29′37″N 81°37′26″W	
139	Kendel Building	Kendel Building	January 29, 2013 (#12001246)	210 Prospect Ave. 41°29′53″N 81°41′26″W	
140	Kennedy Apartments and Commercial Block	Kennedy Apartments and Commercial Block	July 6, 1989 (#85003764)	6425 Detroit Ave. 41°29′02″N 81°43′48″W	
141	Lewis Kies House	Lewis Kies House	August 11, 2004 (#04000833)	4208 Prospect Ave. 41°30′08″N 81°39′25″W	
142	W.H. Kindra Apartments	W.H. Kindra Apartments	March 19, 1987 (#87000434)	3802-2812 Mapledale Ave. 41°27′16″N 81°42′37″W	Address range is wrong on the nomination form. Should be 3802-3812 Mapledale Ave.
143	Krause Building-Otto Moser's Cafe	Krause Building-Otto Moser's Cafe	November 14, 1985 (#85002834)	2042-2044 E. 4th St. 41°29′56″N 81°41′27″W	
144	Theodor Kundtz Company Building	Theodor Kundtz Company Building	February 2, 2001 (#01000051)	2249 Elm St. 41°29′44″N 81°42′22″W	
145	Lake Shore Bank and Cleveland Public Library St. Clair Branch	Lake Shore Bank and Cleveland Public Library St. Clair Branch	December 15, 2015 (#15000901)	5410 St. Clair Ave. and 1368 E. 55th St. 41°31′19″N 81°39′08″W	
146	LaSalle Theatre Building	LaSalle Theatre Building	June 15, 2011 (#11000365)	819-829 E. 185th St. 41°35′06″N 81°32′59″W	
147	League Park	League Park	August 8, 1979 (#79001808)	Lexington and 66th Sts. 41°30′42″N 81°38′39″W	
148	Lerner Building	Lerner Building	June 24, 2000 (#00000750)	322-324 Euclid Ave. 41°30′02″N 81°41′31″W	
149	Lindner Building	Lindner Building	September 13, 1978 (#78002040)	1331 Euclid Ave. 41°30′04″N 81°40′55″W	
150	Lion Knitting Mills	Lion Knitting Mills	September 12, 2016 (#16000617)	3256 W. 25th St. 41°27′57″N 81°42′02″W	
151	Liquid Carbonic Corporation Dry Ice Plant	Liquid Carbonic Corporation Dry Ice Plant	December 22, 2014 (#14001074)	1318 W. 58th St. 41°29′15″N 81°43′36″W	Demolished per Google Street View.
152	Henry W. Longfellow School		February 20, 2020 (#100004982)	650 East 140th St. 41°33′48″N 81°35′07″W	
153	Lorain Avenue Commercial Historic District	Lorain Avenue Commercial Historic District	June 17, 1994 (#94000596)	3202-5730 Lorain Ave. 41°28′50″N 81°42′47″W	
154	Lorain Station Historic District	Lorain Station Historic District	May 13, 1994 (#94000417)	9005-10134 Lorain Ave. 41°28′05″N 81°44′57″W	
155	Lorain-Carnegie Bridge	Lorain-Carnegie Bridge	October 8, 1976 (#76001398)	Spans the Cuyahoga River between Lorain and Carnegie Aves. 41°29′26″N 81°41′30″W	
156	Lower Prospect-Huron Historic District	Lower Prospect-Huron Historic District	November 19, 1995 (#94000640)	Seven blocks in downtown centered around the junction of Prospect Ave., Huron Rd. and E. 9th St.; also 727, 737, 1020-1060, and 1124 Bolivar Rd., 2217 E. 9th St., and 1303 Prospect Ave. 41°29′55″N 81°41′10″W	Second set of addresses represents a boundary increase of June 10, 2005
157	Magnolia-Wade Park Historic District	Magnolia-Wade Park Historic District	October 25, 1990 (#90001566)	Roughly bounded by Asbury Ave., E. 118th St., Wade Park Ave., Mistletoe Dr., Magnolia Dr., and E. 105th St. 41°30′54″N 81°36′30″W	
158	Mallo House	Mallo House	March 19, 1987 (#87000439)	3781 W. 25th St. 41°27′12″N 81°42′04″W	NRHP coversheet has the wrong address. Should be 3731 W. 25th St.
159	Flora Stone Mather College District	Flora Stone Mather College District	February 15, 1974 (#74001442)	Bellflower Rd. at Ford Dr. 41°30′32″N 81°36′28″W	
160	May Company	May Company	January 18, 1974 (#74001443)	158 Euclid Ave. at Public Sq. 41°29′55″N 81°41′31″W	
161	The Mayfield Theatre Building	The Mayfield Theatre Building	June 14, 2013 (#13000389)	12300 Mayfield Road; 41°30′30″N 81°35′50″W	
162	McKinley Terrace	McKinley Terrace	July 9, 1985 (#85001527)	1406-1426 W. 81st St. 41°28′51″N 81°44′29″W	
163	McKinley School		July 18, 2022 (#100007907)	3349 W. 125th St. 41°27′42″N 81°46′30″W	
164	Medical Centre Building	Medical Centre Building	December 20, 1984 (#84000621)	1001 Huron Rd. 41°30′00″N 81°41′06″W	
165	George Merwin House	George Merwin House	June 4, 1973 (#73001412)	3028 Prospect Ave. 41°30′06″N 81°39′52″W	"George Buckingham Merwin ... built a fine brick-house at the head of Prospect Street, which was then west of Sterling, now East 30th Street. When Prospect Street was cut through Sterling, this home was moved to the south side of it. It is a fine type of the architecture of that day, and the high ceilings of its interior, the size of the rooms, and the fine finish of all woodwork evidence refined and dignified taste. It is at present the home of the Rowfant Club, a very appropriate one for book-lovers, as George Merwin was a student all his life."
166	Midtown Historic District		February 22, 2021 (#100006160)	Perkins (south side), Chester, Euclid, Prospect, and Carnegie (north side) Aves., roughly between I-90, East 27th, East 40th and East 55th Sts. 41°30′13″N 81°39′46″W	
167	Miles Park Historic District	Miles Park Historic District	May 17, 1974 (#74001444)	Miles Park Avenue between E. 91st and E. 93rd Streets; 41°26′49″N 81°37′21″W	
168	Miller Block	Miller Block	July 19, 1984 (#84003624)	3202-3214 Lorain Ave. 41°28′55″N 81°42′33″W	
169	Monmouth Building	Monmouth Building	June 27, 2022 (#100007831)	11619 Euclid Ave. 41°30′40″N 81°36′10″W	
170	Montana Apartments	Montana Apartments	November 1, 1984 (#84000230)	2061 E. 36th St. 41°30′04″N 81°39′45″W	Demolished prior to 2005
171	Moreland Theater Building	Moreland Theater Building	September 15, 2011 (#11000670)	11810-11824 Buckeye Rd. 41°28′50″N 81°36′01″W	1927 building by Braverman and Havermaet that served multiple uses in Cleveland's Hungarian community
172	Garrett Morgan House	Garrett Morgan House	December 17, 1982 (#82001369)	5202 Harlem Ave. 41°30′53″N 81°39′12″W	Demolished
173	Mount Auburn School		June 6, 2022 (#100007757)	10110 Mount Auburn Ave. 41°28′34″N 81°36′52″W	
174	Mueller Electric Company Building	Mueller Electric Company Building	February 23, 2016 (#16000042)	1587 E. 31st St. 41°30′32″N 81°40′04″W	
175	Murray Hill School	Murray Hill School	April 28, 1988 (#88000436)	2026 Murray Hill Rd. and 2043 Random Rd. 41°30′27″N 81°35′55″W	
176	Myrtle-Highview Historic District		December 23, 2019 (#100004778)	16209 to 16408 Highview Dr. & 16200 to 16409 Myrtle Ave; Roughly bounded by Lee Rd, Myrtle Ave., Highview Dr. & dead end. 41°25′38″N 81°33′59″W	
177	National Town and Country Club	National Town and Country Club	October 30, 2003 (#03001102)	2401 Euclid Ave. 41°30′08″N 81°40′20″W	
178	Neal Terrace	Neal Terrace	October 3, 2012 (#12000834)	8811 Detroit Ave. 41°28′46″N 81°44′42″W	
179	Neff Apartments	Neff Apartments	November 1, 1984 (#84000231)	3606 Prospect Ave. 41°30′05″N 81°39′45″W	Demolished prior to 2005; the photo is of the structure that replaced that building
180	New England Building	New England Building	September 8, 2000 (#00001065)	617-637 Euclid Ave., 614-626 Vincent Ave. 41°30′01″N 81°41′20″W	
181	Newton Avenue Historic District	Newton Avenue Historic District	August 31, 1988 (#88001298)	9700-10003 Newton Ave. 41°30′41″N 81°37′07″W	
182	Northern Ohio Blanket Mills	Northern Ohio Blanket Mills	June 27, 2014 (#14000353)	3160 and 3166 W. 33rd St., 3401 Paris Ave., and 3167 Fulton Rd. 41°28′05″N 81°42′23″W	
183	North Presbyterian Church	North Presbyterian Church	October 29, 1974 (#74001445)	4001 Superior Ave. 41°30′51″N 81°39′44″W	
184	Notre Dame Academy	Notre Dame Academy	May 26, 1988 (#88000637)	1325 Ansel Rd. 41°31′14″N 81°37′18″W	
185	Ohio Bell Henderson-Endicott Exchange Building	Ohio Bell Henderson-Endicott Exchange Building	November 1, 1984 (#84000232)	5400-5420 Prospect Ave. 41°30′09″N 81°39′09″W	
186	Ohio City Preservation District	Ohio City Preservation District	October 9, 1974 (#74001447)	Bounded by W. 26th, Clinton, W. 38th, and Carroll Sts.; also roughly Franklin Boulevard NW., W. 38th St., Bridge Ave. NW., and W. 44th St., and Stone, W. 25th, Bridge Ave. NW., and W. 28th 41°29′07″N 81°42′33″W	Second set of boundaries represents a boundary increase of May 25, 1989
187	Old Federal Building and Post Office	Old Federal Building and Post Office	May 3, 1974 (#74001448)	201 Superior Ave., NE. 41°30′02″N 81°41′34″W	
188	Old River Road Historic District	Old River Road Historic District	February 1, 2006 (#05001574)	1220-1330 Old River Rd. 41°29′52″N 81°42′09″W	
189	Old Stone Church	Old Stone Church	February 23, 1973 (#73001414)	91 Public Sq. 41°30′01″N 81°41′42″W	
190	Charles Olney House and Gallery	Charles Olney House and Gallery	June 6, 1988 (#88000633)	2241-2255 W. 14th St. 41°28′53″N 81°41′28″W	
191	Oppmann Terrace	Oppmann Terrace	September 19, 2012 (#12000800)	10119 Detroit Ave. 41°28′47″N 81°45′17″W	
192	Panek Block	Panek Block	December 18, 1986 (#86003503)	3154 E. 49th St. 41°28′21″N 81°39′27″W	
193	Park Building	Park Building	July 1, 1996 (#96000674)	140 Public Sq. 41°29′24″N 81°41′00″W	
194	Peerless Motor Company Plant No. 1	Peerless Motor Company Plant No. 1	May 29, 1975 (#75001364)	9400 Quincy Ave. 41°29′33″N 81°37′16″W	Demolished
195	Pennsylvania Railway Ore Dock	Pennsylvania Railway Ore Dock	October 15, 1997 (#95000492)	At Whiskey Island; 41°29′44″N 81°43′19″W	Two of the four historic Hulett ore unloaders were scrapped in 2000, with the remaining two being dismantled.
196	Perry-Payne Building	Perry-Payne Building	July 16, 1973 (#73001415)	740 Superior Ave. 41°29′57″N 81°41′54″W	
197	Pilgrim Congregational Church	Pilgrim Congregational Church	March 17, 1976 (#76001399)	2592 W. 14th St. 41°28′38″N 81°41′31″W	
198	Playhouse Square Group	Playhouse Square Group	October 5, 1978 (#78002041)	2067 E. 14th St.; 1422, 1501, 1515, 1621 Euclid Ave. 41°30′03″N 81°40′51″W	
199	Plaza Apartments	Plaza Apartments	November 1, 1984 (#84000233)	3206 Prospect Ave. 41°30′04″N 81°39′53″W	
200	Prospect Avenue Row House Group	Prospect Avenue Row House Group	March 27, 1974 (#74001450)	3645, 3649, 3651, and 3657 Prospect Ave. 41°30′07″N 81°39′41″W	
201	Quad Hall	Quad Hall	May 26, 1988 (#88000642)	7500 Euclid Ave. 41°30′17″N 81°38′11″W	Demolished
202	Eleanor B. Rainey Memorial Institute	Eleanor B. Rainey Memorial Institute	September 21, 2020 (#100005571)	1523 East 55th St. 41°31′03″N 81°39′07″W	Three-story, 9,000-square-foot 1904 Tudor Revival building designed by the architectural firm of Badgley and Nicklas to look like a home. Originally called the Willson Avenue Industrial Institute, the name changed to the Eleanor B. Rainey Memorial Institute in 1905.
203	Rauch & Lang Carriage Company Building	Rauch & Lang Carriage Company Building	November 25, 2022 (#100008415)	2168 West 25th St. 41°28′56″N 81°42′06″W	
204	Record Rendezvous	Record Rendezvous	January 23, 2013 (#12001213)	300 Prospect Ave. 41°29′53″N 81°41′26″W	
205	N.J. Rich and Co. Building	N.J. Rich and Co. Building	May 1, 2003 (#03000322)	1974 E. 61st St. 41°30′20″N 81°38′55″W	
206	The Richman Brothers Company	The Richman Brothers Company	September 19, 2012 (#12000795)	1600 E. 55th St. 41°30′56″N 81°39′09″W	
207	Riverside Cemetery Chapel	Riverside Cemetery Chapel	March 19, 1987 (#87000446)	3607 Pearl Road; 41°27′23″N 81°41′51″W	Gothic Revival chapel built in 1876. It received an addition and minor alterations in 1897. Closed due to disrepair in 1953, it underwent a major renovation beginning in 1995 and reopened in 1998.
208	Riverside Cemetery Gatehouse	Riverside Cemetery Gatehouse	March 19, 1987 (#87000445)	3607 Pearl Road; 41°27′20″N 81°42′01″W	1897 Gothic Revival/Romaesque Revival office building designed by Charles W. Hopkinson. A significant interior renovation occurred about 1991.
209	Rockefeller Building	Rockefeller Building	June 4, 1973 (#73001416)	614 Superior Ave. 41°29′53″N 81°41′51″W	
210	Rockefeller Park and Cleveland Cultural Gardens Historic District	Rockefeller Park and Cleveland Cultural Gardens Historic District	May 4, 2005 (#05000382)	Roughly bounded by Mt. Sinai Rd., East Boulevard, Conrail tracks, and Ansel Rd. 41°31′30″N 81°37′22″W	
211	Rockefeller Park Bridges	Rockefeller Park Bridges	September 27, 1977 (#77001051)	Rockefeller Park; 41°31′41″N 81°37′34″W	
212	Root and McBride-Bradley Building	Root and McBride-Bradley Building	July 18, 1980 (#80002978)	1220-1230 W. 6th St. 41°30′03″N 81°42′01″W	
213	St. Elizabeth's Magyar Roman Catholic Church	St. Elizabeth's Magyar Roman Catholic Church	January 30, 1976 (#76001402)	9016 Buckeye Rd. 41°29′07″N 81°37′24″W	
214	St. Ignatius High School	St. Ignatius High School	January 21, 1974 (#74001451)	1911 W. 30th St. at Carroll Ave. 41°29′00″N 81°42′28″W	
215	St. John's AME Church	St. John's AME Church	December 17, 1982 (#82001370)	2261 E. 40th St. 41°29′48″N 81°39′22″W	
216	St. John's Episcopal Church	St. John's Episcopal Church	February 23, 1973 (#73001418)	2600 Church St. 41°29′24″N 81°42′30″W	
217	St. Luke's Hospital	St. Luke's Hospital	June 10, 2005 (#05000579)	11311 Shaker Boulevard; 41°29′06″N 81°36′21″W	
218	St. Michael the Archangel Catholic Church	St. Michael the Archangel Catholic Church	January 18, 1974 (#74001452)	3114 Scranton Rd. 41°28′11″N 81°41′50″W	
219	St. Paul's Episcopal Church	St. Paul's Episcopal Church	November 25, 1980 (#80002979)	4120 Euclid Ave. 41°30′12″N 81°39′28″W	
220	St. Stanislaus Church	St. Stanislaus Church	June 22, 1976 (#76001404)	Forman and E. 65th Sts. 41°27′33″N 81°38′41″W	
221	St. Stephen Church	St. Stephen Church	November 25, 1977 (#77001052)	1930 W. 54th St. 41°28′44″N 81°43′26″W	
222	St. Theodosius Russian Orthodox Cathedral	St. Theodosius Russian Orthodox Cathedral	January 18, 1974 (#74001453)	733 Starkweather Ave. 41°28′38″N 81°40′54″W	
223	Charles Schweinfurth House	Charles Schweinfurth House	May 22, 1973 (#73001417)	1951 E. 75th St. 41°30′20″N 81°38′10″W	Designed by Charles F. Schweinfurth. NRHP coversheet has wrong address of 1915 E. 75th St.
224	Levi Scofield House	Levi Scofield House	December 31, 2019 (#100004823)	2438 Mapleside Rd. 41°29′30″N 81°36′33″W	
225	Scranton South Side Historic District	Scranton South Side Historic District	June 30, 2015 (#15000371)	2314-2658 and 3339 Scranton Rd., 1632-2101 Holmden, 1644-2115 Brainard, 1724-2105 Corning, and 1701-2034 Clover Aves. 41°27′53″N 81°41′50″W	
226	Shaker Square	Shaker Square	July 1, 1976 (#76001400)	Shaker and Moreland Boulevards; 41°29′02″N 81°35′26″W	
227	Shaker Village Historic District	Shaker Village Historic District	May 31, 1984 (#84003650)	Roughly bounded by Fairmount and Lomond Boulevards and Green, Warrensville Center, Becket, and Coventry Rds.; also roughly bounded by Lomond Boulevard, Lytel Rd., Scottsdale Boulevard, and Lindholm Rd. 41°28′33″N 81°33′11″W	Second set of boundaries represents a boundary increase of January 5, 2001. Extends into Cleveland Heights and Shaker Heights, elsewhere in Cuyahoga County
228	Shiloh Baptist Church	Shiloh Baptist Church	December 17, 1982 (#82001371)	5500 Scovill Ave. 41°29′29″N 81°39′04″W	
229	Sidaway Bridge	Sidaway Bridge	October 3, 2022 (#100008227)	Sidaway Avenue over Kingsbury Run, connecting Sidaway Ave. and East 67th and Sidaway Ave near Berwick Rd. 41°27′00″N 81°38′34″W	
230	Society for Savings Building	Society for Savings Building	November 7, 1976 (#76001401)	Public Sq. 41°30′02″N 81°41′40″W	
231	South Brooklyn Commercial District	South Brooklyn Commercial District	February 25, 2005 (#05000092)	Roughly along Pearl and Broadview Rds. 41°26′30″N 81°42′18″W	
232	Southworth House	Southworth House	November 1, 1984 (#84000234)	3334 Prospect Ave. 41°30′04″N 81°39′48″W	
233	J. Spang Baking Company	J. Spang Baking Company	June 14, 2018 (#100002551)	2707 Barber Ave. 41°28′31″N 81°42′03″W	
234	Stager-Beckwith House	Stager-Beckwith House	April 20, 1978 (#78002042)	3813 Euclid Ave. 41°30′14″N 81°39′35″W	
235	Stanley Block	Stanley Block	April 27, 2011 (#94000591)	2115-2121 Ontario St. 41°29′52″N 81°41′29″W	Demolished in December, 2012
236	Stockbridge Apartment Building	Stockbridge Apartment Building	August 8, 1985 (#85001693)	3328 Euclid Ave. 41°30′10″N 81°39′41″W	
237	Stuyvesant Motor Company Building	Stuyvesant Motor Company Building	September 22, 2015 (#15000612)	1937 E. Prospect Ave. 41°30′02″N 81°40′35″W	
238	Superior Avenue Historic District	Superior Avenue Historic District	February 21, 2007 (#07000072)	1860-2553 Superior Ave. 41°30′29″N 81°40′37″W	
239	Superior Avenue Viaduct	Superior Avenue Viaduct	June 9, 1978 (#78002043)	Superior Ave. 41°29′41″N 81°42′16″W	
240	Tavern Club	Tavern Club	November 1, 1984 (#84000235)	3522 Prospect Ave. 41°30′04″N 81°39′47″W	
241	Templar-Farrell Motor Sales Building	Templar-Farrell Motor Sales Building	November 1, 1984 (#84000237)	3134 Prospect Ave. 41°30′04″N 81°39′55″W	
242	The Temple	The Temple	August 30, 1974 (#74001455)	University Circle at Silver Park; 41°30′29″N 81°36′58″W	
243	Templin-Bradley Company	Templin-Bradley Company	June 14, 2013 (#13000390)	5700 Detroit Ave. 41°29′07″N 81°43′32″W	
244	Third Church of Christ, Scientist	Third Church of Christ, Scientist	March 19, 1987 (#87000444)	3648 W. 25th St. 41°27′17″N 81°42′06″W	
245	Hannes Tiedemann House	Hannes Tiedemann House	March 15, 1982 (#82004417)	4308 Franklin Boulevard; 41°29′08″N 81°42′59″W	Commonly known as Franklin Castle
246	Tinnerman Steel Range Company	Tinnerman Steel Range Company	February 21, 2017 (#100000663)	2048 Fulton Rd. 41°28′50″N 81°42′40″W	Factory building constructed in segments from 1886 to 1914, where the first steel cooking range and the first speed nut was manufactured.
247	Clayton Townes House	Clayton Townes House	March 19, 1987 (#87000435)	3800 W. 33rd St. 41°27′06″N 81°42′19″W	
248	Tremont Historic District	Tremont Historic District	July 15, 1994 (#94000719)	Roughly bounded by Interstate 490, Interstate 71, University Ct., W. 7th St., Starkweather Ave., Brayton, Fruit Ave. and Auburn Ave. 41°28′45″N 81°41′16″W	
249	Trinity Cathedral	Trinity Cathedral	June 4, 1973 (#73001420)	Euclid Ave. at E. 22nd St. 41°30′04″N 81°40′28″W	
250	Trinity Cathedral Church Home	Trinity Cathedral Church Home	November 1, 1984 (#84000239)	2227 Prospect Ave. 41°30′02″N 81°40′27″W	
251	Union Club	Union Club	February 15, 1974 (#74001456)	1211 Euclid Ave. 41°30′12″N 81°41′04″W	
252	Union Steel Screw Office Building	Union Steel Screw Office Building	January 13, 1989 (#88003193)	1675-7 E. 40th St. 41°30′39″N 81°39′33″W	
253	Union Terminal Group	Union Terminal Group	March 17, 1976 (#76001405)	Public Sq. 41°29′52″N 81°41′39″W	
254	United Motor Service Building	United Motor Service Building	November 1, 1984 (#84000240)	4019 Prospect Ave. 41°30′09″N 81°39′25″W	
255	Universal Terminal Company Dock and Warehouse	Universal Terminal Company Dock and Warehouse	September 8, 1983 (#83001954)	5451 N. Marginal Rd. 41°31′48″N 81°39′20″W	
256	University Hall, Cleveland State University	University Hall, Cleveland State University	February 6, 1973 (#73001421)	2605 Euclid Ave. 41°30′11″N 81°40′14″W	
257	Upson-Walton Company Building	Upson-Walton Company Building	January 21, 1974 (#74001457)	1310 Old River Rd. (W. 11th St.); 41°29′53″N 81°42′10″W	
258	USS Cod	USS Cod	January 14, 1986 (#86000088)	N. Marginal Dr. 41°30′37″N 81°41′32″W	The USS COD Submarine Memorial is a National Historic Landmark and is docked in Cleveland, Ohio.
259	Van Rooy Coffee Company Building	Van Rooy Coffee Company Building	June 16, 2004 (#04000608)	2900 Detroit Ave. 41°29′23″N 81°42′41″W	
260	Variety Store Building and Theatre	Variety Store Building and Theatre	April 1, 1982 (#82003559)	11801-11825 Lorain Ave. 41°27′40″N 81°46′14″W	Renovated in the 2010s
261	Venice Building	Venice Building	October 1, 1990 (#90001496)	8401-8417 Euclid Ave. 41°30′14″N 81°37′43″W	Demolished prior to 2003
262	Vitrolite Building	Vitrolite Building	October 13, 2004 (#04001148)	2911-2915 Detroit Ave. 41°29′22″N 81°42′42″W	
263	Wade Memorial Chapel	Wade Memorial Chapel	June 18, 1973 (#73001422)	12316 Euclid Ave. inside Lake View Cemetery; 41°30′49″N 81°35′42″W	
264	Wade Park District	Wade Park District	October 2, 1982 (#82001372)	Roughly bounded by E. 105th St., East Boulevard, and Chester and Euclid Aves. 41°30′30″N 81°36′46″W	
265	Walker and Weeks Office Building	Walker and Weeks Office Building	November 1, 1984 (#84000259)	2341 Carnegie Ave. 41°29′58″N 81°40′21″W	
266	Warner & Swasey Company Building	Warner & Swasey Company Building	September 20, 2019 (#100004410)	5701 Carnegie Ave. 41°30′06″N 81°39′02″W	
267	Warszawa Neighborhood District	Warszawa Neighborhood District	November 28, 1980 (#80002980)	E. 65th St. and Forman Ave. 41°27′29″N 81°38′41″W	
268	Waterman Service Building	Waterman Service Building	August 17, 2001 (#01000897)	3030 E. 63rd St. 41°28′34″N 81°38′50″W	
269	Watterson School	Watterson School	October 8, 1992 (#92001354)	1422 W. 74th St. 41°28′55″N 81°44′10″W	Demolished
270	Weizer Building	Weizer Building	February 8, 1988 (#88000055)	8935 Buckeye Rd. 41°29′07″N 81°37′25″W	Demolished
271	Weizer Building	Weizer Building	November 21, 2002 (#02001360)	11801 Buckeye Rd. 41°28′52″N 81°36′02″W	
272	West 25th Street-Detroit Avenue Historic District	West 25th Street-Detroit Avenue Historic District	January 23, 2013 (#12001214)	Roughly bounded by Detroit Ave., Aust Ct., W. 25th & W. 28th Sts. 41°29′26″N 81°42′26″W	
273	West Side Market	West Side Market	December 18, 1973 (#73001423)	W. 24th St. and Lorain Ave. 41°29′04″N 81°42′11″W	
274	West Technical High School	West Technical High School	August 21, 2001 (#01000898)	2201 W. 93rd St. 41°28′19″N 81°44′48″W	
275	Western Reserve Building	Western Reserve Building	October 30, 1973 (#73001424)	1468 W. 9th St. 41°29′50″N 81°41′59″W	
276	Phillis Wheatley Association	Phillis Wheatley Association	August 24, 1979 (#79001809)	4450 Cedar Ave. 41°30′00″N 81°39′18″W	
277	White Chewing Gum Company Building	White Chewing Gum Company Building	March 9, 2000 (#00000181)	10307 Detroit Ave. 41°28′49″N 81°45′26″W	
278	Henry P. White House	Henry P. White House	July 16, 1973 (#73001425)	Northwestern corner of Euclid Ave. and E. 90th St. 41°30′14″N 81°37′23″W	
279	WHK Studio One	WHK Studio One	November 1, 2019 (#100004561)	4900-5002 Euclid Ave. 41°30′14″N 81°39′15″W	
280	Woodland Avenue and West Side Railroad Powerhouse	Woodland Avenue and West Side Railroad Powerhouse	June 4, 1979 (#79001810)	1180 Cathan Ave., NW; 41°29′47″N 81°42′13″W	
281	Woodland Cemetery	Woodland Cemetery	June 4, 1986 (#86001253)	6901 Woodland Ave. 41°28′54″N 81°38′30″W	City cemetery established in 1853 which became Cleveland's most prominent burying ground for the next half-century. It fell into extreme disrepair, and most of its outstanding architectural features dismantled or demolished between 1915 and 1951. It has undergone moderate restoration since 2000.
282	Woodland-Larchmere Commercial Historic District	Woodland-Larchmere Commercial Historic District	September 1, 2015 (#15000560)	12019-13165 Larchmere and 2618 N. Moreland; 41°29′15″N 81°35′35″W	Extends into Shaker Heights, elsewhere in Cuyahoga County
283	Zero Gravity Research Facility (B-2)	Zero Gravity Research Facility (B-2)	October 3, 1985 (#85002801)	Lewis Research Center; 41°24′44″N 81°51′51″W	
284	Zion Lutheran Church	Zion Lutheran Church	November 1, 1984 (#84000261)	2062 E. 30th St. 41°30′02″N 81°40′03″W	
285	Zion Lutheran School	Zion Lutheran School	November 1, 1984 (#84000264)	2074 E. 30th St. 41°30′01″N 81°40′02″W	

== Former listings ==
	Name on the Register	Image	Date listed	Date removed	Location	Description
1	Cuyahoga Building	Cuyahoga Building	December 31, 1974 (#74001436)	May 5, 1983	216 Superior Avenue NE	Imploded on October 3, 1982.
2	Holy Name High School-Gallagher Building		March 27, 1975 (#75001363)	February 21, 1980	8318 Broadway SE.	Demolished
3	McDonald's Drive-in		June 15, 1990 (#90000851)	March 21, 1991	988 E. 152nd St.	Demolished
4	Newburgh Town Hall	Newburgh Town Hall	October 30, 1973 (#73001413)	October 29, 1985	9213 Miles Park Avenue	Suffered fire in November 1984, demolished in 1985
5	Northern Ohio Lunatic Asylum	Northern Ohio Lunatic Asylum	October 30, 1973 (#73002289)	May 30, 1978	4455 Turney Road	Also known as Newburgh State Hospital and Cleveland State Hospital. Demolished in 1994.
6	Rocket Engine Test Facility	Rocket Engine Test Facility	April 3, 1985 (#85002800)	April 4, 2005	Lewis Research Center	Former National Historic Landmark. Demolished in 2003 for runway expansion at the Cleveland Hopkins International Airport.
7	St. Joseph's Church and Friary		June 17, 1976 (#76001403)	January 31, 1995	2543 E. 23rd Street	Demolished in 1993 after several fires.
8	Sterling School		February 25, 1974 (#74001454)	May 5, 1983	2104 E. 30th Street	Demolished in 1982.

== See also ==
- List of National Historic Landmarks in Ohio
- National Register of Historic Places listings in Ohio
