= Third Church of Christ, Scientist (Cleveland) =

Historic church in Ohio, United States

- U.S. National Register of Historic Places
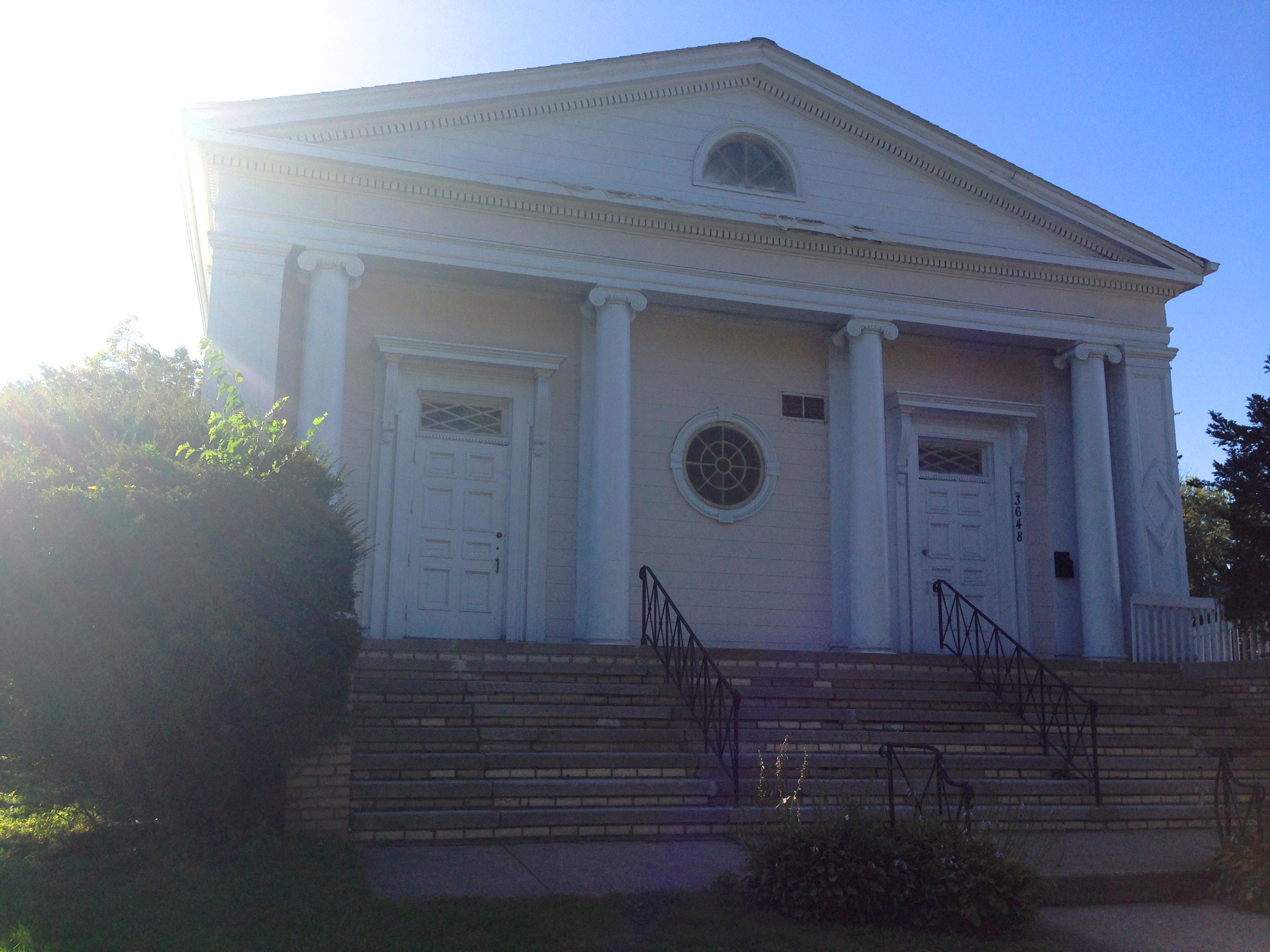

- Location within Cleveland Location within Ohio Location within the United States
- Location: 3648 W 25th St (now 3648 Pearl Road) Cleveland, Ohio
- Coordinates: 41°27′17″N 81°42′6″W
- Built: 1906
- Architect: Frederick N. Striebinger; Carl Audus
- Architectural style: Classical Revival
- MPS: Brooklyn Centre MRA
- NRHP reference No.: 87000444
- Added to NRHP: March 19, 1987

The former Third Church of Christ, Scientist built in 1906 is an historic Christian Science church building located at 3648 West 25th Street (now 3648 Pearl Road) in Cleveland, Ohio, It was designed in the Classical Revival style by noted Cleveland architect Frederick N. Striebinger.

On March 19, 1987, it was added to the National Register of Historic Places. As of that date the building was vacated, but managed by Kotecki Monuments. The building housed Bethlehem Temple of Praise Church. It is now listed as Iglesia de Restauracion Elim with Pastor Felipe Ruiz as of July 2018.

The Third Church of Christ, Scientist is no longer listed in the Christian Science Journal.

== See also ==
- List of former Christian Science churches, societies and buildings
- List of Registered Historic Places in Cleveland, Ohio
