= Zion Lutheran Church (Cleveland) =

- Zion Lutheran Church; Zion Lutheran School
- U.S. National Register of Historic Places
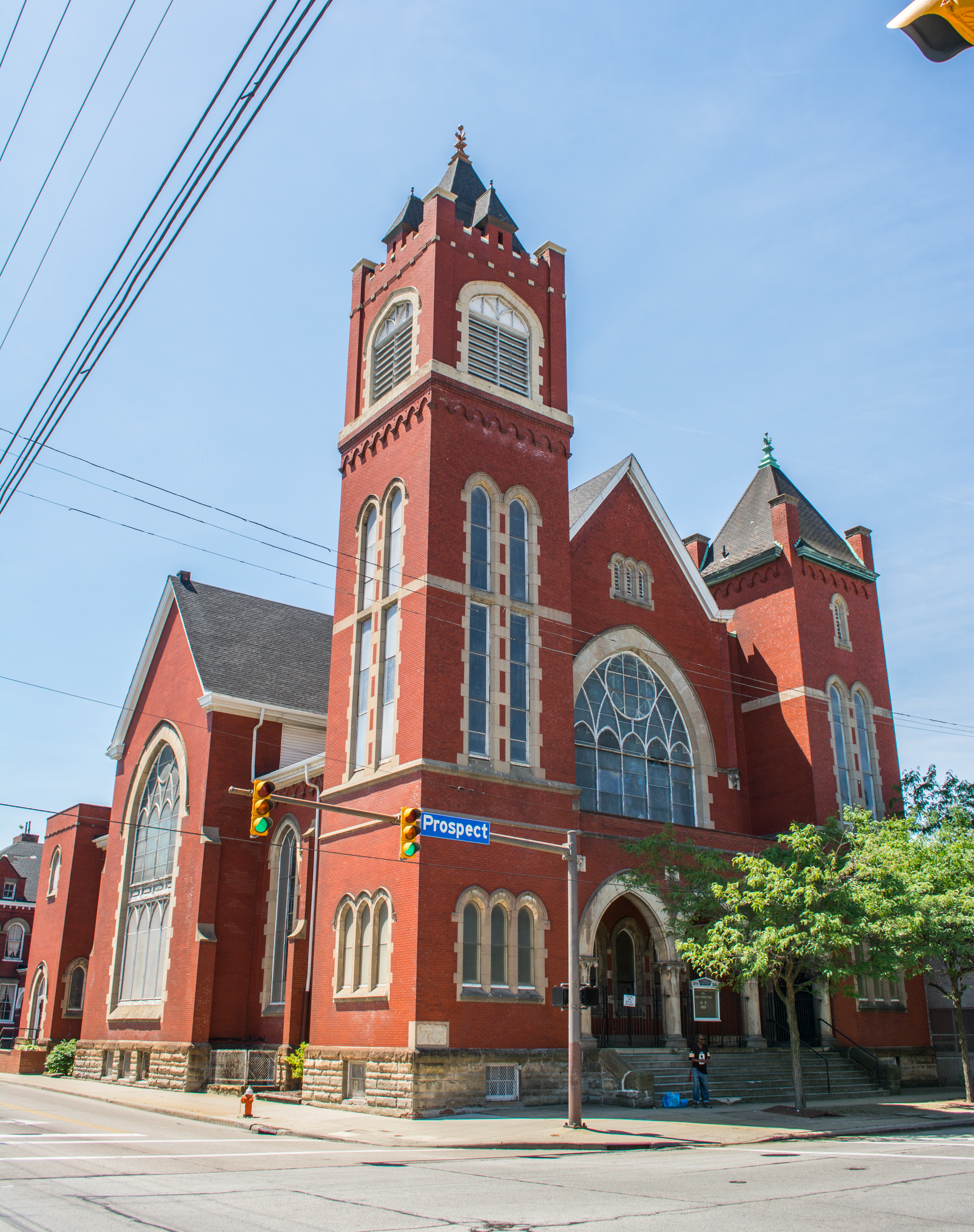
- Front and eastern side of the church

- Location within Cleveland Location within Ohio Location within the United States
- Location: 2062 (church) and 2074 (school) E. 30th St., Cleveland, Ohio
- Coordinates: 41°30′2″N 81°40′3″W
- Area: Less than 1 acre (0.40 ha)
- Built: 1902
- Architect: Frank Walker (church); William H. Dunn (school)
- Architectural style: Late Gothic Revival (church); Colonial Revival, Queen Anne (school)
- MPS: Upper Prospect MRA
- NRHP reference No.: 84000261 (church); 84000264 (school)
- Added to NRHP: November 1, 1984

Zion Lutheran Church is a historic Lutheran church located along Prospect Avenue near downtown Cleveland, Ohio, United States. Formed in the 1840s, the congregation built the present building shortly after 1900, along with an adjacent church school. Both buildings have been named historic sites. The school is no longer open.

Since approximately 1860, the stretch of Prospect Avenue where Zion Lutheran was built had been a primarily residential neighborhood. It was one of the city's richer areas, as demonstrated by the grandness of churches such as Zion, First Methodist, Trinity Cathedral, and St. Paul's Episcopal Church on Euclid Avenue. This condition persisted into the mid-1910s, at which point the neighborhood transitioned into a largely commercial area. Beginning after 1930, the neighborhood deteriorated as many buildings were demolished, often to create room for parking lots.

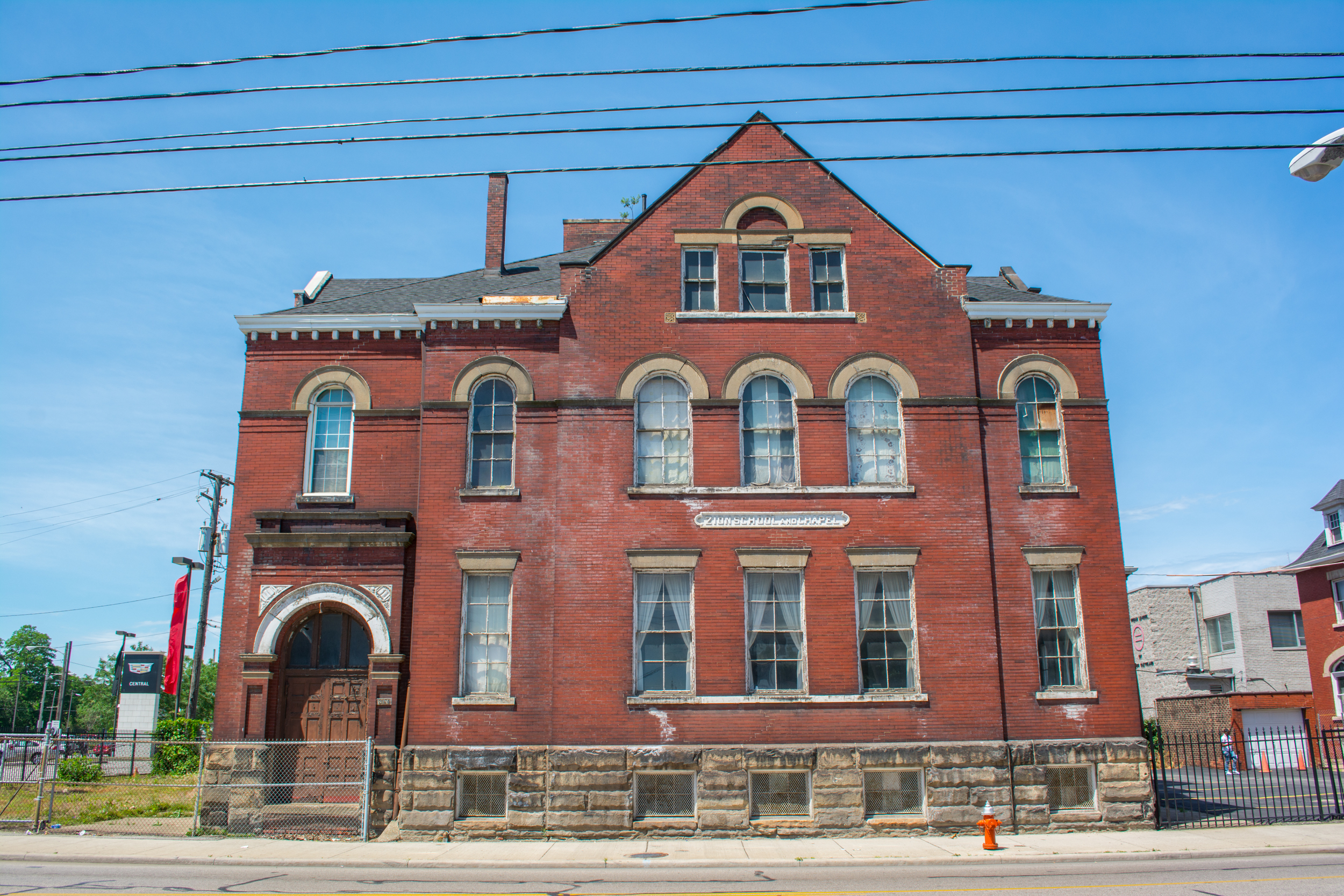
Front view of the school

In such an environment Zion Lutheran Church was constructed in 1902 and opened for public use in the following year. It is home to a congregation founded by German immigrants in 1843, the oldest extant Lutheran congregation in the city. Many other Cleveland-area Lutheran congregations, including Trinity Lutheran Church, are Zion's daughters. The original church building was located downtown, but the east-side German community was strong enough by 1902 that the congregation deemed Prospect Avenue a better location for serving the community. From its earliest years, the congregation had sponsored a school; Zion Lutheran School was founded in 1848, at which time all scholars were instructed in German. The school moved to Prospect Avenue ahead of the church. The present building was completed in 1903, two years after the completion of the auditorium and the opening of classes therein. William Dunn was the architect for the school, while the architect for the church was Frank Walker of Walker and Weeks.

Both the school and the church are brick buildings with stone foundations and additional elements of stone. The church is in the Gothic Revival style of architecture, while the school building mixes elements of the Queen Anne and Colonial Revival styles. The school is no longer used as such, with classes having ceased in 1974. In 1984, Zion Lutheran Church and School were each listed on the National Register of Historic Places, both qualifying because of their historically significant architecture and because of their role in local history. The two were part of a multiple property submission of buildings along Prospect Avenue, along with nearby buildings such as First Methodist Church, the Phillip Gaensslen House, and the Dr. William Gifford House. They have also been given city historic-landmark designation, and their location at Prospect and E. 30th is located within the city-designated Prospect Avenue Historic District. The congregation was a founding member of the Lutheran Church–Missouri Synod (LCMS), within which it has remained.

== First Christmas tree in an American church building ==
One of the congregation's early pastors was Heinrich Christian Schwan, who also served as the third president of the LCMS. He has been credited with being the first pastor to erect a Christmas tree in an American church sanctuary when he and his wife erected one at Zion Lutheran in 1851, located then at the corner of Lakeside Avenue and East Sixth Street in Cleveland. A plaque commemorating the event has been placed at the site by the Cleveland Landmarks Commission. However, research has shown that there was at least one prior instance, namely by Rev. John Muehlhaeuser in Rochester, New York, in 1840.
