= Dunham Tavern =

Historic tavern in Cleveland, Ohio, United States

- U.S. National Register of Historic Places
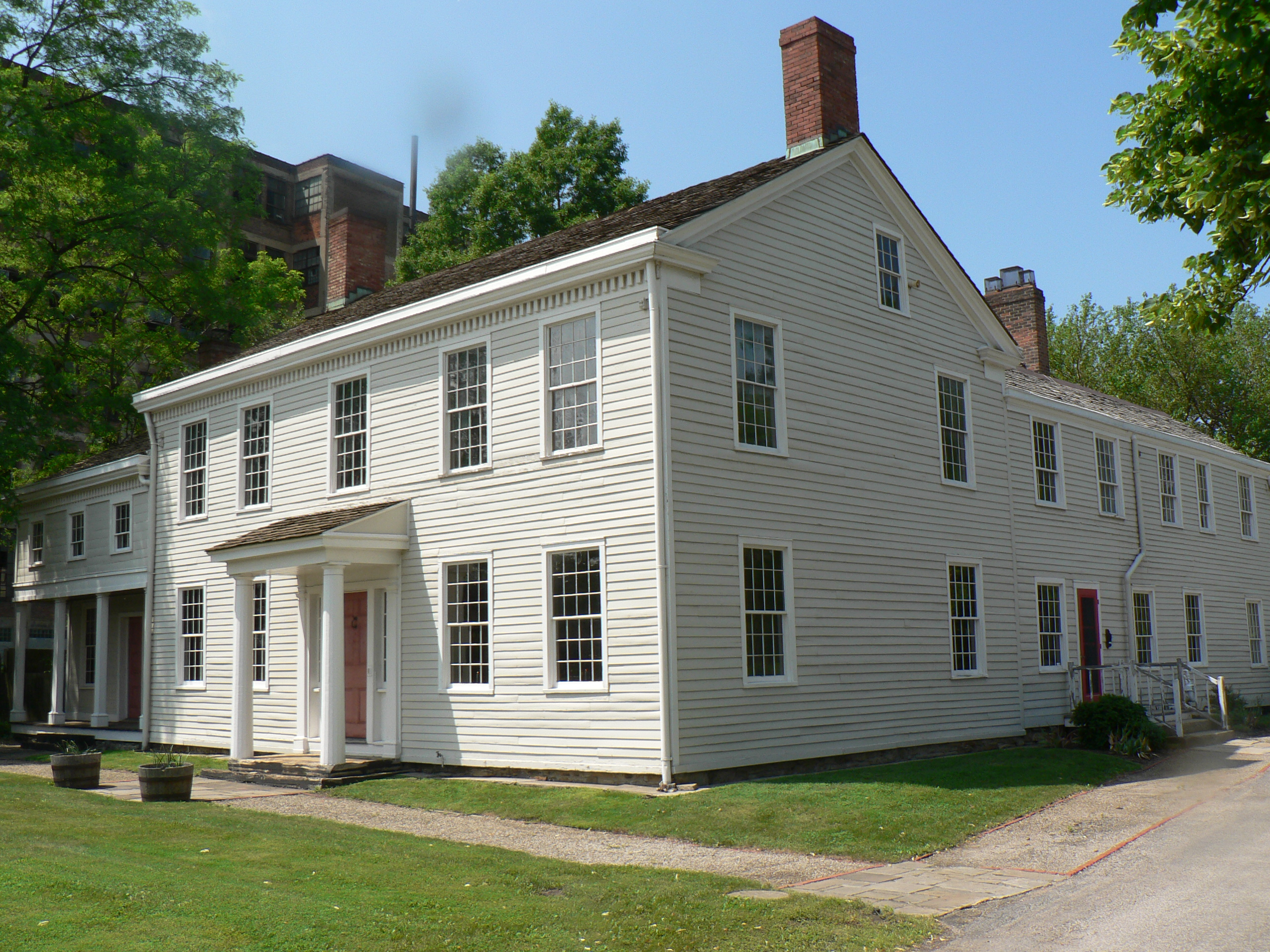
- Dunham Tavern

- Location within Cleveland Location within Ohio Location within the United States
- Location: 6709 Euclid Ave., Cleveland, Ohio
- Coordinates: 41°30′16.4″N 81°38′35.6″W
- Area: 1 acre (0.40 ha)
- Built: 1842
- NRHP reference No.: 74001439
- Added to NRHP: July 25, 1974

The Dunham Tavern, also known as the Dunham Tavern Museum, is the oldest building in Cleveland, Ohio, located at 6709 Euclid Avenue. Rufus and Jane Pratt Dunham built their first home on the site in 1824, and the existing taproom was built in 1842. It is believed to be the first building constructed on Euclid Avenue east of East 55th Street and the first frame house on the street. It later became a stagecoach stop and tavern.

== Restoration ==
Cleveland activist and landscape architect, A. Donald Gray purchased the home in 1932, restoring the 19th century architecture and replanting the orchard. Gray later established a non-profit organization tasked with maintaining the property. The home was re-opened as the Dunham Tavern Museum in 1941.

In 1982, the two non-profit organizations that cared for the property – Dunham Tavern, Inc. (est. by Gray in 1936) and the Society of Collectors, Inc. (which assumed responsibility for the tavern in 1941) – merged into one corporate entity, the Corp. of Dunham Tavern Museum.

On August 25, 2023, a tornado toppled a tree near the building, damaging the roof and façade.

== Landmark status ==
The Dunham Tavern was named a Cleveland Landmark in 1973 and added to the National Register of Historic Places on July 25, 1974.

== See also ==
- List of Registered Historic Places in Cleveland, Ohio
