= Woodland-Larchmere Commercial Historic District =

Historic district in Ohio, United States

- U.S. National Register of Historic Places
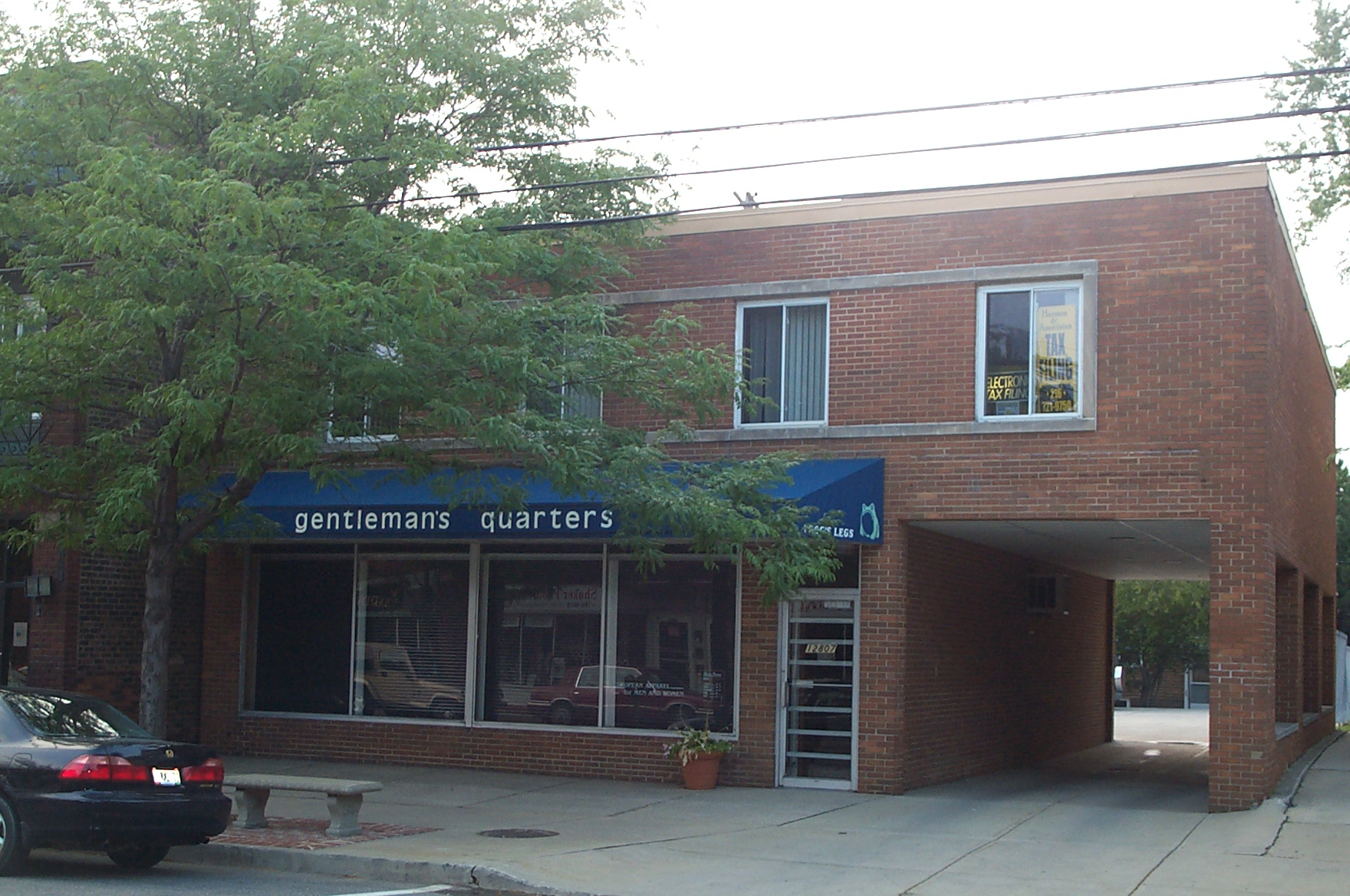
- DePietro Building, at 12807 Larchmere

- Location within Ohio
- Location: 12019-13165 Larchmere and 2618 N. Moreland, in Shaker Heights and Cleveland, Ohio
- Coordinates: 41°29′15″N 81°35′35″W
- Area: 19.08 acres (7.72 ha)
- NRHP reference No.: 15000560
- Added to NRHP: September 1, 2015

The Woodland-Larchmere Commercial Historic District is a historic district which was listed on the National Register of Historic Places in 2015. It is spans the border of Cleveland, Ohio and Shaker Heights, Ohio, in Cuyahoga County, Ohio.

The process to achieve National Register listing was a "'long haul'" according to Charles "Chip" Bromley, director of the Shaker Square Alliance and the Ohio Fair Lending Coalition.

The district was deemed to be "a well intact urban neighborhood commercial corridor which maintains a high level of historic architectural integrity throughout the District. This is exhibited in the various types and styles of commercial buildings which span from 1904-1965 and through the retention of historic architectural elements, fabric, materials, and craftsmanship. The historic commercial buildings located along Larchmere Avenue in both Shaker Heights and Cleveland maintain their historic setting, feeling and design associated with the historic character as noted in historic images of the buildings in their historic setting."

The listing included 67 contributing buildings and 12 non-contributing ones.
