= Cleveland West Pierhead Light =

Lighthouse in Ohio, United States

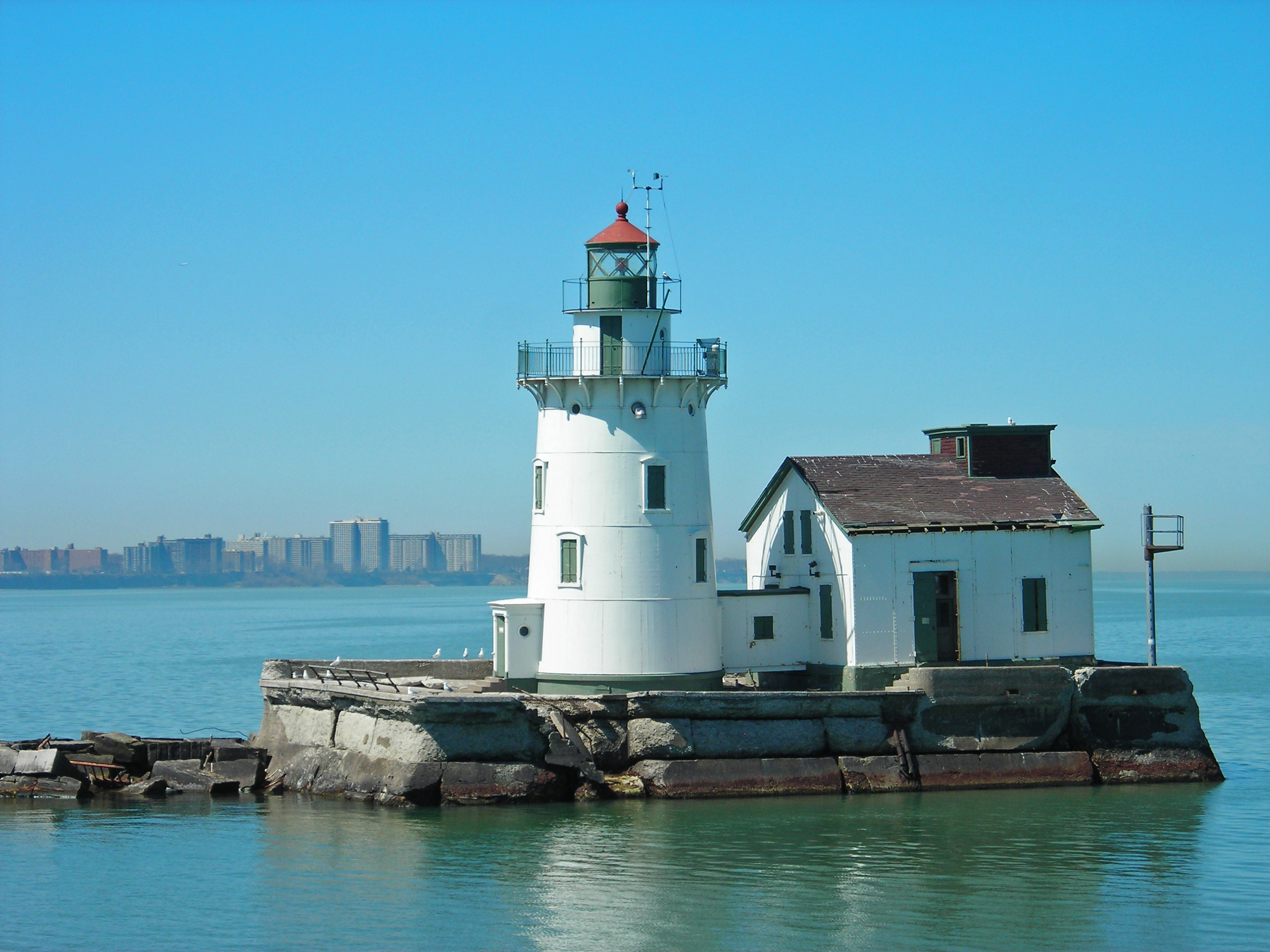
- Location: Cuyahoga County, Cleveland, United States
- Coordinates: 41°30′32″N 81°43′04″W

Tower
- Constructed: 1884
- Construction: cast iron
- Height: 50 ft (15 m), 20 m (66 ft)
- Heritage: National Register of Historic Places listed place

Light
- First lit: 1911
- Focal height: 63 ft (19 m), 19 m (62 ft)
- Range: 11 nmi (20 km; 13 mi), 6 nmi (11 km; 6.9 mi)
- Characteristic: Fl R 6s, Fl WR 6s
- Cleveland West Pierhead Light
- U.S. National Register of Historic Places
- NRHP reference No.: 83001950

Cleveland West Pierhead Light, sometimes called Cleveland Harbor West Pierhead Light, is a lighthouse in Cleveland, Ohio, United States. It is on the National Register of Historic Places.

In 2023, the United States General Services Administration (GSA) announced that the lighthouse would be sold by auction. The lighthouse was sold in September 2023. With that sale not closing, in April 2026 the GSA was attempting to donate it.
