= Bingham Company Warehouse =

- U.S. National Register of Historic Places
- U.S. Historic district – Contributing property
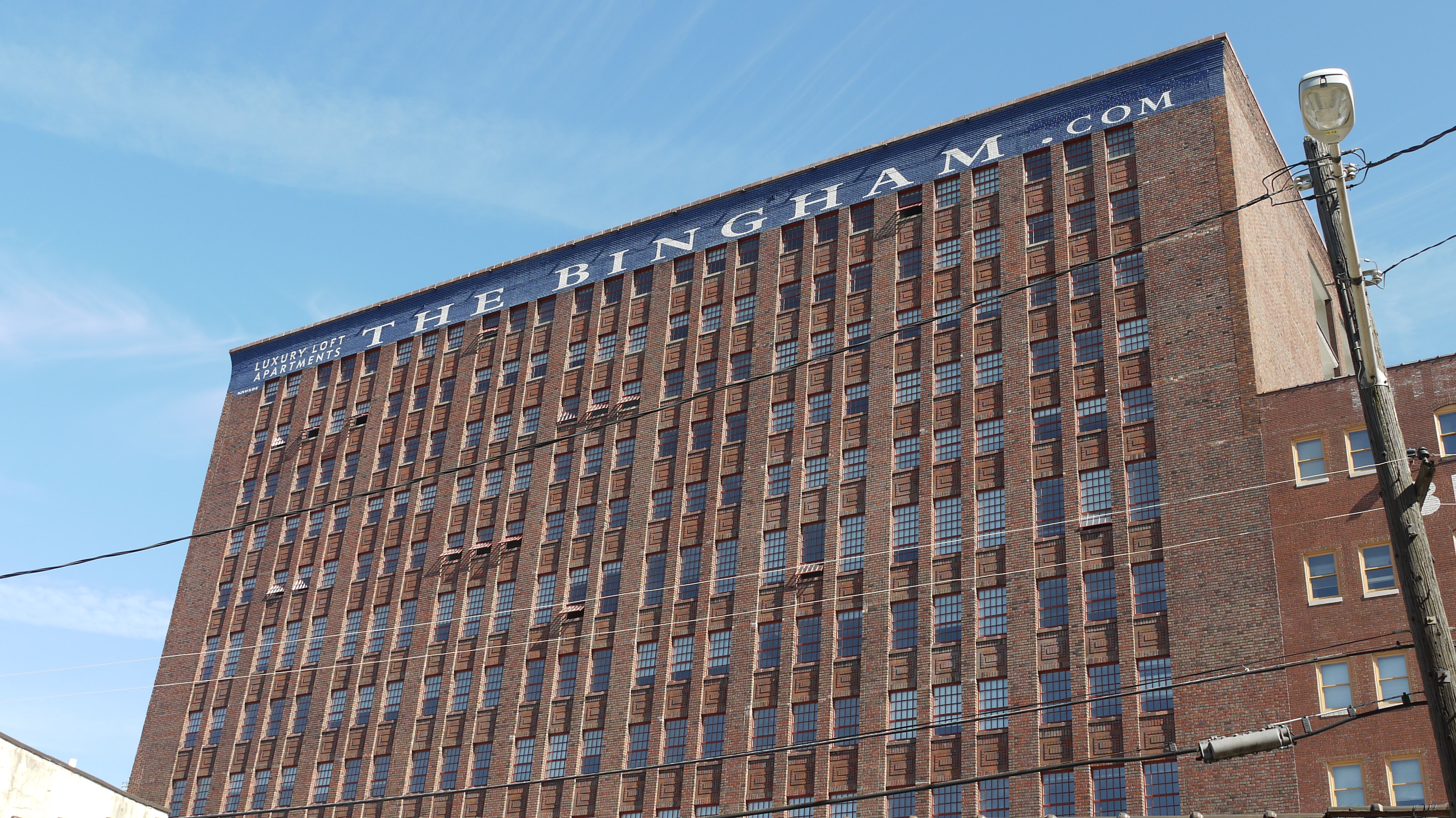

- Location within Cleveland Location within Ohio Location within the United States
- Location: 1278 W. 9th Street, Cleveland, Ohio, U.S.
- Coordinates: 41°29′56″N 81°42′05″W
- Built: 1916
- Architect: Walker and Weeks
- Architectural style: Commercial
- Website: www.thebingham.com
- Part of: Cleveland Warehouse District (ID82003558)
- NRHP reference No.: 73001406

Significant dates
- Added to NRHP: November 2, 1973
- Designated NRHP: November 2, 1973
- Designated CP: September 30, 1982

The Bingham Company Warehouse is a historic warehouse located in Cleveland, Ohio, in the United States. It was designed by the noted local firm of Walker and Weeks for the W. Bingham Company, and is one of the architectural firm's few utilitarian commercial buildings. For many years, W. Bingham Co. was the Midwest's largest hardware manufacturer and wholesaler. The W. Bingham Co. went out of business in 1961, and the warehouse was sold to a succession of owners over the years. The warehouse was sold to private investors in 2001, who converted it into apartments, known today as The Bingham.

== About the building ==
=== Construction ===
Cleveland entrepreneurs William Bingham and Henry C. Blossom purchased the Clark & Murfey hardware store in 1841, and incorporated it as the W. Bingham Co. in 1888.

In April 1913, the W. Bingham Co. announced it would construct a new building in the city's Warehouse District as its new headquarters. Intended to be the largest warehouse in Cleveland, the cost of the building and land were estimated at $1 million ($32,600,000 in 2025 dollars). At the time of the announcement, the company had already completed the purchase of the land at a cost of about $400,000 ($13,000,000 in 2025 dollars), and its architect, the noted Cleveland firm of Walker & Weeks, had finished preliminary designs for the building. The architects drew heavily on Knox & Elliott's 1905 Rockefeller Building as well as their own 1912 Renkert Building for inspiration, The warehouse, which was anticipated to be of steel and concrete construction, was designed to have a spur from the Cleveland, Cincinnati, Chicago and St. Louis Railway (the "Big Four") run into its basement. The architects hoped to have as many as 17 truck loading docks on the building's northwest side, with a truck parking garage in one of the three basements. Another basement would be used for the storage of the heaviest goods. Elevators were intended to be located in the center of the building, so they could be reached quickly and efficiently by all points on each floor. At some point in 1913 or 1914, Christian, Schwarzenberg & Gaede, a local structural engineering firm, was hired to assist with the plans.

By June 1914, work on the architectural plans had advanced to the point where W. Bingham Co. was ready to place an order for up to 2,500 short tons (2,300 t) of structural steel and rebar. But city officials had extensive concerns about the architectural design, and extensive (if unreported) changes to the plans were under way in July 1914. At the end of July, W. Bingham Co. awarded the contract for the general contractor's job to the Cleveland construction firm Crowell-Lundoff-Little. Although the city was still withholding final approval for the architectural plans and building permit, enough of the design had won approval for the contractor to advise steel companies that it was interested in purchasing about 1,600 short tons (1,500 t) of shaped steel. Although the design controversy continued, the McClintic-Marshall Corp. received the contract for 1,500 short tons (1,400 t) of shaped steel in early August 1914, the Ayer & Lord Tie Co. of Chicago won the contract for 9,400 square yards (7,900 m^{2}) of flooring and Carnegie Steel received the contract for 2,100 short tons (1,900 t) of rebar in reinforcing bars in late August.

Final approval of the architectural plans must have been close by the beginning of August 1914, because excavation at the site began. Plans now showed 10 above-ground floors (each of reinforced concrete) and three basement levels. At a total estimated cost of land and construction at $1 million ($31,800,000 in 2025 dollars), it was reportedly the largest warehouse in the United States. The Fred R. Jones Company did the excavation work. The work was extremely difficult. The excavation site was 150 by 434 feet (46 by 132 m), a large existing building abutted the southwest side of the site, and there was a very steep 25-foot (7.6 m) change in grade from the northeast to southwest. A steam shovel was used to remove the 70,000 cubic yards (54,000 m^{3}) of earth, and steel sheet pilings were rammed into the soil to prevent cave-ins along the sides. These pilings were left in place to support the combined slab and pier foundation and freestanding retaining wall. Both the Big Four and the New York, Chicago and St. Louis Railroad (the "Nickel Plate") ran a joint spur onto the site, (Note: Getting gondola cars onto the site was difficult. Trains had to move up and down a steep 7 percent grade, and make an extremely tight 28 degree curve.) then hauled the earth several miles to Kingsbury Run (where it was used as landfill). Excavation was complete in mid-October.

The city issued a permit for construction of the foundation about the time the excavation was complete. The foundation used a combination of piers, slab, footings, and retaining walls. The total cost of the foundation was originally estimated to be about $50,000 ($1,600,000 in 2025 dollars). Soil tests revealed a hard bluish clay about 50 to 60 feet (15 to 18 m) below the surface, and the piers rested on this clay. Cantilevered retaining walls with buttresses were built to hold back the surrounding earth, and two-way reinforced spread footings poured to support the walls. (Note: A spread footing has a base wider than the top of the footing, allowing pressure to be spread out over a wider area of the soil. A two-way reinforced spread footing has beams running perpendicular to one another beneath the footing to help prevent deflection.) The William Edwards Co. building on the southwest side of the new warehouse left insufficient space for regular footings and a buttressed retaining wall to be used. Instead, 14-inch (36 cm) Lackawanna sheet pilings were used to reinforce the wall, and two separate footings were built. As construction of the foundation proceeded, numerous pockets of quicksand were found in the soil. Further investigation revealed that pockets of quicksand lay beneath almost all the footings on the building's northeast side. A test pit was dug, and soil engineers discovered a solid clay further down. Light sheet pilings were used to create caissons. These were excavated, and the footings carried down to the firm clay.

The city issued a building permit in late February or early March 1915. Work on the basement floors and walls proceeded very slowly. Enormous coal and ash bins and long steel rails for the moving of heavy items were designed to hang from ceiling beams in these areas. This required the use of shaped steel pieces which had to be perfectly joined, and the pouring of concrete around them. Once the basements were complete, the rest of the building rose very swiftly. Upper floors were poured at a rate of three floors a day, and the exterior brick walls rose at the rate of one floor every two days.

The W. Bingham Co. warehouse opened for business in February or March 1916.

=== Building characteristics ===
The W. Bingham Co. warehouse building cost $600,000 ($19,100,000 in 2025 dollars). It is largely constructed of brick, concrete, and steel. The slightly L-shaped building was 99 feet (30 m) wide on W. 9th Street and 198.5 feet (60.5 m) wide on W. 10th Street and had a total length of 435 feet (133 m) (455 feet (139 m) between the basement walls). On W. 9th Street, eight floors were visible and the building height was 101 feet (31 m). On W. 10th Street, 11 floors were visible and the building height was 148 feet (45 m). Each floor had 57,000 square feet (5,300 m^{2}) of space, for a total building interior space of 683,892 square feet (63,535.6 m^{2}).

As viewed from W. 9th Street, the building had three basements. The rear (or southwest) wall of the third basement was actually a heavily reinforced slab and pier retaining wall 28 feet (8.5 m) high, giving the third basement a ceiling 25 feet (7.6 m) high. The third basement extended about 50 feet (15 m) under W. 9th Street, while the second and first basements only extended about 20 feet (6.1 m) under the street. There were originally only two large shipping doors, each roughly 37 feet (11 m) wide and 21 feet (6.4 m) high, in the rear wall of the third basement. To accommodate the doors, two exterior columns had to be omitted. In their place are two massive girders, each 41 feet (12 m) long and resting on a single massive pier between the doors. A railroad spur ran under the building's ell (along the line of the old Mandrake Avenue), and there were 24 truck loading docks on the structure's northwest side.

The superstructure of the building featured unusually heavy columns and floor slabs designed to permit 500 pounds per square foot (24 kPa) on the floors of the first and second basement and the first and second floor, and 300 pounds per square foot (14 kPa) on floors three and higher. In order to accommodate the weight of the boiler, coal bin, ash bin, and associated equipment at the rear of the second basement, a portion of this floor was designed to withstand 700 pounds per square foot (34 kPa). The octagonal, steel core-and-concrete columns in this area were 59 feet (18 m) tall, extending from the foundation up to the second floor. Four of the exterior wall columns as well as all interior columns in the three basements and first floor were also steel core-and-concrete, to support the stresses on the structure below-ground. (Note: The cores of these columns consisted of 14 inches (36 cm), 148-pound (67 kg) Bethlehem Steel H-girders. Their sides and flanges were reinforced with 16-inch (41 cm) steel plates. The core, its flanges, and the plates were drilled to permit rebar to pass through, rather than around, them.) Above the second floor, all columns were reinforced concrete. (Note: These columns were either round with octagonal or spiral reinforcements, or square with longitudinal reinforcements.) The bases of all the columns consisted of cast iron-and-two-way reinforced concrete. All column caps were reinforced with shelf angles attached to the flanges and core reinforcement plates, and all columns were topped with octagonal plates reinforced with stiffeners. Above the second floor, all column tops were flared to help support the floor slab above. Due to complications created by the William Edwards building next to it, there were fewer exterior and interior columns in the structure's southwest corner. Instead, 7-foot-long (2.1 m) cantilevers supported the exterior walls above the third floor. (Note: The exterior walls here were 13 inches (33 cm) thick to help make up for the fewer columns.)

The floors of the basements and upper floors were poured in 20.5 square feet (1.90 m^{2}) slabs. These slabs were 11 inches (28 cm) thick in the basements and on the first floor, and 9.5 inches (24 cm) thick on all other floors. The roof was a 7.5-inch-thick (19 cm) slab. Spandrel beams were not used in the flooring system. The exception was on the fourth floor: With offices to be located on the third floor, the architects wanted to do away with column caps in order to provide space for lighting fixtures and to avoid light-scattering. Spandrels in the fourth floor were needed to compensate for the weaker support. Flooring throughout the structure was Kreolite, a creosote-impregnated wood block.

The exterior of the building was clad in paving brick rejects. Walker & Weeks had used uniformly-colored paving brick on the Renkert Building, which it had designed shortly before beginning work on the W. Bingham Co. warehouse. Architect Harry Weeks recommended paving brick for the Bingham building because it was strong, long-wearing, and inexpensive. "Seconds" (bricks which were not uniform in color due to chemical differences, miscasting, or after spending too much time curing in the kiln) were recommended by Weeks because they created an aesthetically pleasing "tapestry effect which might be assumed to have resulted from careful artistic design, rather than accident and economy." Windows in the building all had steel sashes and wire mesh glass. The roofline was a simple concave cavetto cornice.

The interior of the building, as befit a warehouse, was relatively spartan. Five elevators were grouped in the center of the structure, and a pneumatic tube network installed in the shafts as a space-saving measure. The building also featured several spiral package chutes, and an exterior surface parking lot.

The cost of the land and completed building was $1 million ($31,800,000 in 2025 dollars). All told, 300 short tons (270 t) of cast iron, 1,200 short tons (1,100 t) of structural steel, 2,300 short tons (2,100 t) of rebar, and 38,000 cubic yards (29,000 m^{3}) of concrete were used in its construction. When completed, it was reportedly the largest single-unit warehouse in the world.

=== Architectural assessment ===
The W. Bingham Co. warehouse building is widely considered one of the finest Commercial style buildings in Cleveland. It features extremely high-quality construction and design, which is unusual for a utilitarian building. It is also, according to the Ohio Historic Places Dictionary, an early example of "vertical rectangular construction of a building in a manner clearly appropriate to its function."

The structure is widely celebrated for the inspired use of paving brick seconds, which adds color and texture to the building. The exterior is considered unusually sophisticated, with "subtle refinements of proportion and detail". It has also won praise for the simple, repetitive piers that bring it to life.

== History of the building ==
With the completion of the warehouse, the W. Bingham Co. shifted from retail to wholesale-only operations. Over the years, changes to the interior reduced the available space to just 500,000 square feet (46,000 m^{2}).

W. Bingham Co. ceased operations in June 1961. Several executives with the company purchased the corporate indicia, inventory, and equipment and formed a new company, Bingham, Inc. The new firm continued to sell Bingham products to manufacturing, mining, and railroad customers. W. Bingham Co. continued to own the warehouse, and leased space in it to various kinds of firms (including Bingham Inc.)

Some time on or before 1971, the Bingham building was purchased by the Ostendorf-Morris Co., a local real estate investment company.

In November 1973, the W. Bingham Co. warehouse was added to the National Register of Historic Places.

Having been purchased by outside investors in 1970 and by Formweld Products Co. in 1973, Bingham Co. moved out of the building in 1980.

During the W. Bingham Co. warehouse's first half century, Cleveland and the Warehouse District went into significant decline. The rapid and significant expansion in heavy industry in Cleveland ended about 1930, and contracted dramatically after 1950. As the century neared its close, only chemical, instrument and medical equipment, and plastics manufacturing remained as major employers. The city's population reached a high of 914,808 in 1950, but dropped to under 400,000 at the turn of the century (and continued to decline). In the Warehouse District, 115 of the 175 buildings, representing more than half the area, were demolished. The number of residents living in the area had dropped from a high of 12,068 in 1950 to a low of 3,844 in 1970 (although they had recovered slightly to 4,651 in 1990).

=== 2000-2004 renovation and repurposing ===
At the beginning of the 21st century, the W. Bingham Co. warehouse was relatively unused. A few small city and county agencies and offices had leased space on the structure's ground floor, while the remainder of the building was used for storage or was empty. Although the building had never been renovated in the past 85 years, it was in good condition. It was also the largest building in the Warehouse District which had yet to undergo demolition or redevelopment.

In February 2000, Bingham Burnside LLC, a company established by owners and executives of the Burnside Construction Co. of Chicago, initiated a process to purchase the Bingham building for an undisclosed sum.

Bingham Burnside sought to redevelop the structure into a mixed-use development. The company planned spending $66.7 million ($121,300,000 in 2025 dollars) on converting 379,606 square feet (35,266.6 m^{2}) of space into 339 apartments, 292,666 square feet (27,189.6 m^{2}) of space into a 340-vehicle parking garage, (Note: Architectural plans called for using the three basements and the rear of the first and second floor for parking. The front of the first floor would be retail, and the front of the second floor residential. Floors three through eight would be completely residential.) and 21,000 square feet (2,000 m^{2}) of space into ground-floor retail. Bingham Burnside hired Marous Brothers Construction as the general contractor overseeing the project, which it hoped to begin on April 1, 2001. To pay for the conversion, Bingham Burnside received a $2 million ($4,900,000 in 2025 dollars) loan from the city of Cleveland, $7.4 million ($13,500,000 in 2025 dollars) in historic preservation tax credits from the state; and a $7.8 million ($14,200,000 in 2025 dollars) conservation easement from the state. The city also agreed to give the developers a 75 percent tax abatement for the project's first five years, a 50 percent tax abatement for its next five years, and a 25 percent tax abatement in its 11th and 12th years.

Relocation of tenants was nearly complete by early June 2002, somewhat behind schedule. By then, the cost of converting the 693,272-square-foot (64,407.1 m^{2}) building (Note: Footage reports varied. In 1993, The Plain Dealer newspaper had said the building only had 558,000 square feet (51,800 m^{2}) of interior space.) had risen to $70 million ($127,300,000 in 2025 dollars). The United States Department of Housing and Urban Development (HUD) awarded Bingham Burnside a $41.8 million ($74,800,000 in 2025 dollars) conversion loan. The Bingham became the largest HUD-financed project in Ohio to date. The loan allowed construction on the project to begin in the fall of 2002, with construction expected to be completed in summer 2003.

Unanticipated construction delays meant that the Bingham apartments did not open until May 2004. The final cost of the conversion was $80 million ($140,000,000 in 2025 dollars).

In late 2004, Constantino's Market opened in 9,600 square feet (890 m^{2}) of space on the ground floor of the Burnham on W. 9th Street. The space, a former showroom for W. Bingham Co. hardware goods, was restored and conserved. Although the space was broken up by several columns, these were reutilized as display shelves. Constantino's received a $380,000 ($600,000 in 2025 dollars) below-market loan from the city to help pay for the space's renovation.

=== Conversion awards ===
The conversion of the warehouse won two awards. The first was the Downtown Development Award, given by the Downtown Cleveland Partnership in March 2005 to Bingham Burnside . The second Award for Excellence in Renovation (Other Buildings), given by the Northern Ohio Chapter of the National Association of Industrial and Office Properties to Marous Brothers Construction in May 2005.

=== Ownership changes ===
Burnside Construction suffered severe economic losses during the Great Recession of 2008–2010, and in May 2007 filed for Chapter 7 bankruptcy (liquidation). Although The Bingham apartment building was 80 percent full and Constantino's was expanding its space on the ground floor, Bingham Burnside LLC was unable to make its loan payments without the support of its parent company. HUD seized the mortgage and title to the building, and actioned off the mortgage. Resource Real Estate bought the loan for $25 million in March 2010, and successfully completed a foreclosure proceeding against Bingham Burnside. Resource Real Estate won court approval to sell The Bingham in July 2010 in order to satisfy the mortgage.

Resource Real Estate won the November 1, 2010, auction for The Bingham. The company said it planned no major changes at the complex, but would make cosmetic improvements to the common areas.

== Bibliography ==
- Allen, Edward (2005). How Buildings Work: The Natural Order of Architecture. New York: Oxford University Press. ISBN 9780195161984.
- Avery, Elroy McKendree (1918). A History of Cleveland and Its Environs: The Heart of New Connecticut. Volume III. Chicago: Lewis Publishing Company.
- Buettell, R.B. (October 1915). "The Bingham Warehouse, Cleveland, Ohio". The Wisconsin Engineer. pp. 117–123.
- Historic Warehouse District Development Corporation (March 2002). Historic Warehouse District Master Plan (PDF) (Report). Cleveland, Ohio. Archived from the original (PDF) on August 24, 2015.
- Johannesen, Eric (1998). A Cleveland Legacy: The Architecture of Walker and Weeks. Kent, Ohio: Kent State University Press. ISBN 9780873385893.
- McCormac, Jack C.; Brown, Russell H. (2016). Design of Reinforced Concrete. Hoboken, N.J.: Wiley. ISBN 9781118879108.
- "New Steel and Concrete Structure to Furnish Nearly Sixteen Acres of Floor Space". The Engineering Record: 356. September 18, 1915.
- Ohio Historic Places Dictionary. Hamburg, Mich.: State History Publications. 2008. ISBN 9781878592705.
- Weeks, Harry E. (December 1916). "Paving Brick Used in Modern Architecture". Dependable Highways. pp. 5–7.
