= Fairhill Road Village =

- Fairhill Road Village Historic District
- U.S. National Register of Historic Places
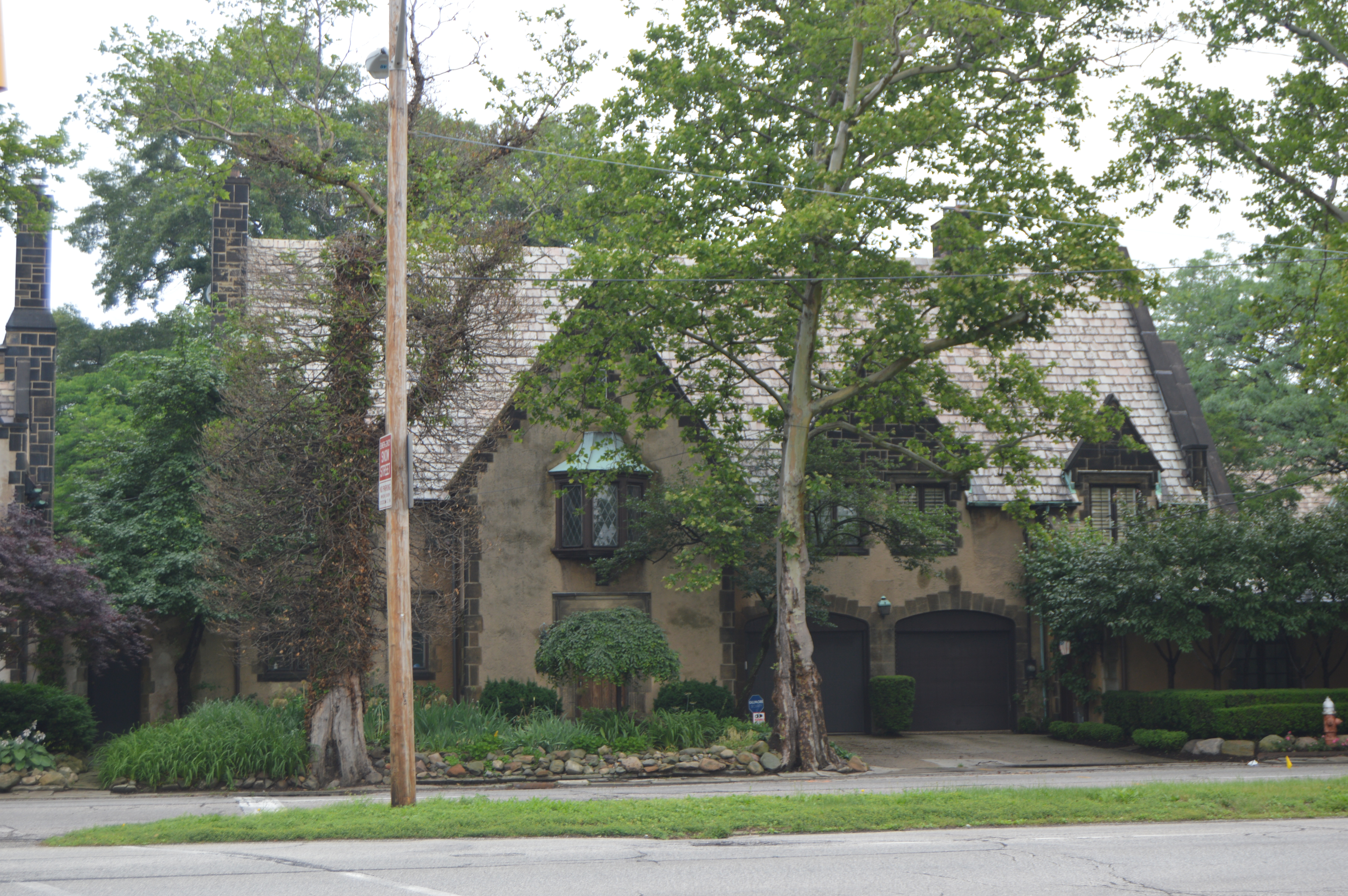

- Location within Ohio
- Location: 12309-12511 Fairhill Rd., Cleveland Heights and Cleveland, Ohio
- Coordinates: 41.493333°N 81.596389°W
- Area: 2 acres (0.81 ha)
- Built: 1929
- Architect: Fullerton, H.O.; Gray, A. Donald
- Architectural style: Tudor Revival
- NRHP reference No.: 90000758
- Added to NRHP: May 10, 1990

Fairhill Road Village (called locally "Belgian Village") is a small housing development on the border of Cleveland and Cleveland Heights, Ohio.

As Fairhill Road Village Historic District it was listed on the National Register of Historic Places in 1990.

The village is a small planned community, a collection of five pairs of semi-detached buildings and three separate dwellings, designed in English Cotswold style.

It was designed by landscape architect A. Donald Gray with architects Antonio DiNardo and H. O. Fullerton.

It includes 12 contributing buildings and Tudor Revival architecture.
