= Brownell School and Annex =

- U.S. National Register of Historic Places
- U.S. Historic district – Contributing property
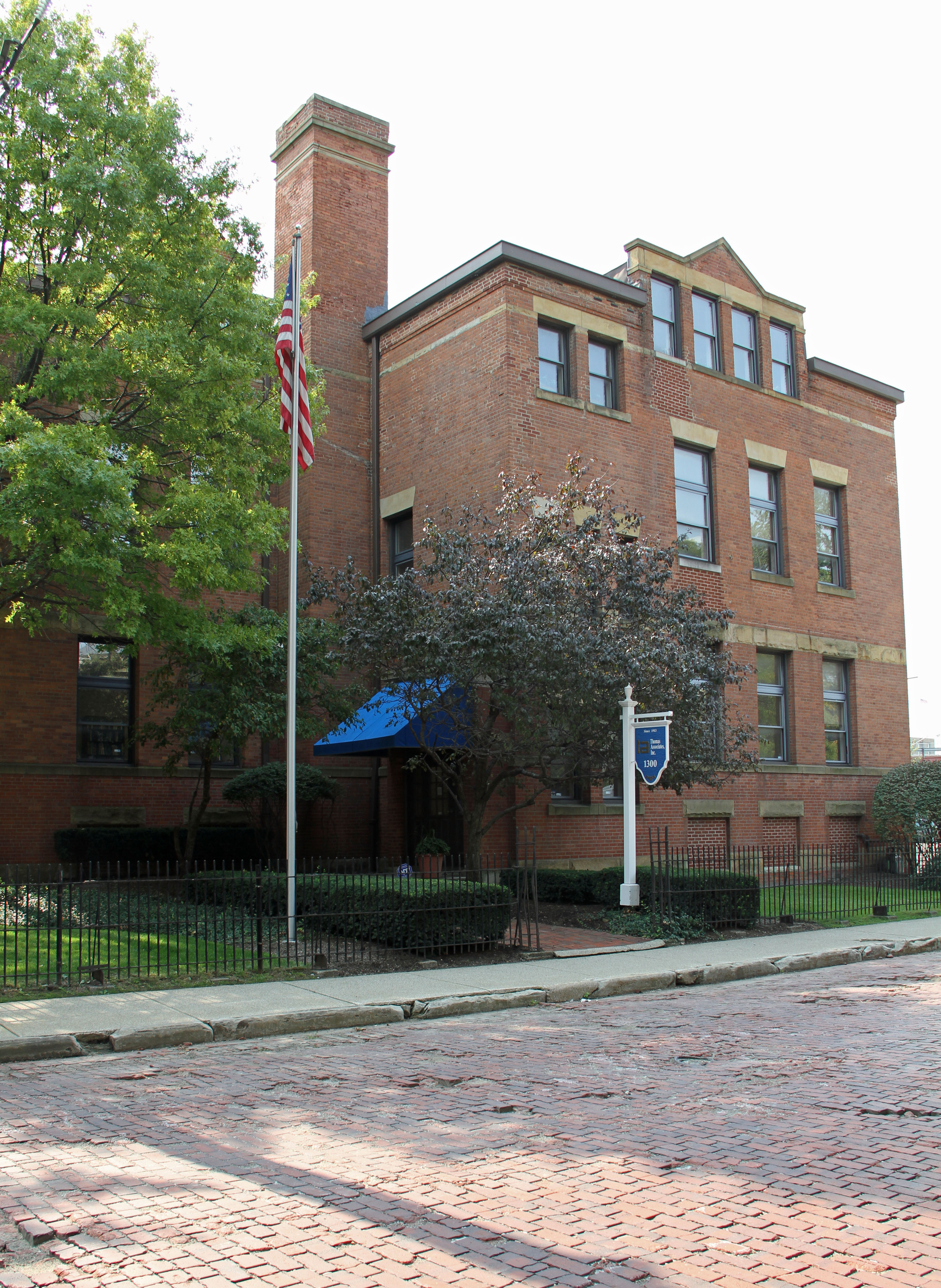
- "Fourth school" annex of the Brownell School

- Location within Cleveland Location within Ohio Location within the United States
- Location: 1300-1360 Sumner Street, Cleveland, Ohio, U.S.
- Coordinates: 41°29′52″N 81°40′49″W
- Built: 1885 (school 3); 1905 (school 4); 1909 (school 5)
- Architect: John Eisenmann (school 3); Frank Seymour Barnum (schools 4 and 5)
- Architectural style: Queen Anne
- Part of: Lower Prospect-Huron Historic District (ID94000640)
- NRHP reference No.: 05001576

Significant dates
- Added to NRHP: February 1, 2006
- Designated NRHP: February 1, 2006
- Designated CP: November 19, 1995

The Brownell School and Annex are three historic former public school buildings located on Sumner Street in Cleveland, Ohio, in the United States. The Queen Anne-style main building was designed by prominent local architect John Eisenmann, and erected from 1884 to 1885. The first annex was designed by noted local architect Frank Seymour Barnum, and completed in 1905. The second annex, also by Barnum, was finished in 1909. Several individuals of local and national importance were educated there or taught school there, and the building served as the first campus of Cuyahoga Community College in 1962. The building was sold to private owners in 1979, and the complex underwent a major renovation from 1983 to 1985.

The buildings are a contributing property to the Lower Prospect-Huron Historic District, which was added to the National Register of Historic Places on November 19, 1995. The buildings themselves were added to the National Register on February 1, 2006.

== About the buildings ==
=== First school (demolished circa 1865) ===
On July 30, 1850, the city of Cleveland purchased for $600 ($23,220 in 2025 dollars) lot number 10 on Clinton Street (later known as Brownell Street, and still later as E. 14th Street). This 100-by-198-foot (30 by 60 m) lot (known today as 2261 E. 14th Street) was purchased for the purpose of erecting a public school. Construction of a 44-by-46-foot (13 by 14 m), two-story brick structure (Note: Historian William J. Akers says the building was three stories high. However, a contemporary report says it was two stories, which is the figure used here.) began in the fall of 1851. Local builder John Gill constructed the school at a cost of $3,500 ($100,000 in 2025 dollars). The school opened in January 1852.

The Clinton School, as it was originally known, proved immensely popular with area residents. It became so overcrowded after just a single semester that in July 1852 the school board ordered that a third floor be added to the structure. This was built by Josiah Chase during the summer, at a cost of $175 ($6,773 in 2025 dollars). A 24-by-60-foot (7.3 by 18.3 m), one-story wooden addition was added in 1856, again to alleviate overcrowding.

=== Second school (demolished 1930) ===
In May 1863, the Cleveland Board of Education determined that a new, larger school was needed to replace the 1851 structure. The city purchased lots 17, 18, and 19 on the southern corner of the intersection of Sumner Street and Brownell avenue in September 1863. Noted local architect Simeon Porter designed the structure. With the American Civil War proving a drain on city finances, it was not until August 1864 that local builder Levi Aust was given a contract to build the new school. The 25-room brick grammar school, was completed in May 1865. It was named the Brownell Street School. (Note: 1958 and 1990 stories in The Plain Dealer claimed the school was named for Cleveland mayor Abner C. Brownell, who died in 1857. Clinton Avenue was renamed Brownell Avenue in Brownell's honor, so the claim is indirectly true.) The original school and its addition were demolished, and the original lot sold.

By at least 1874, the structure's name had been shortened to "Brownell School". With Cleveland's population rising rapidly, the Brownell School once more became overcrowded. Six temporary buildings had been moved onto the Brownell Street School lot or erected there by 1880, and two rooms rented in a nearby church, to provide room for the expanded student population.

=== Third school (completed 1885) ===
Rapidly expanding student populations led the Cleveland Board of Education to approve construction of a large annex to the Brownell School in December 1883. Two lots (22 and 23), totaling 88 by 121 feet (27 by 37 m), were purchased for $3,048 ($100,000 in 2025 dollars). Temporary school structures, recently condemned by the Cleveland Health Board, were demolished.

A two-story, eight room building, (Note: One report in The Plain Dealer claimed it was a 12-room structure.) in the Queen Anne architectural style, designed by prominent local architect John Eisenmann, was built. This $19,397 ($700,000 in 2025 dollars) edifice was nearing completion in March 1885, and opened in September 1885. This annex was known as the Sumner School, or "Brownell Relief" building.

=== Fourth school (completed 1905) ===
In January 1903, the Board of Education approved the construction of a six-room annex building for the Brownell School. The land, constituting the remainder of the block, was purchased in 1903, at a cost of about $3,000 ($100,000 in 2025 dollars).

Prominent local architect Frank Seymour Barnum, who had served as the school district's staff architect since 1895, designed the structure. Although only six rooms, each of the rooms was 35 percent larger than in the other buildings. The structure cost $29,561 ($1,100,000 in 2025 dollars), for a total cost (building, land, and improvements) of $33,475 ($1,200,000 in 2025 dollars).

=== Fifth school (completed 1909) ===
The 1905 building proved only to be a stop-gap measure. In June 1908, the school district approved construction of a new wing, to cost $10,000, to connect the Brownell and Sumner schools. The work included adding a third floor (containing an auditorium) to the Sumner School, and building a 19-by-39-foot (5.8 by 11.9 m) pool in the basement of the addition. Also designed by Barnum, construction began in November 1908 with general contractor D.C. Griese & Walker overseeing the work.

The connecting wing opened in mid-March 1909.

== Post-construction history of the structures ==
=== Historicity of the structures ===
By 1909, Brownell School was one of the most advanced in the city. It was believed to be one of the first schools in the United States to have a swimming pool, and was the first in Cleveland to do so. It was the first Cleveland school to own a movie projector, the first to own a phonograph, the first to offer kindergarten, and one of the earliest to offer bilingual education. According to the United States Bureau of the Census, the school was the most ethnically diverse in the nation, with 41 nationalities represented among its 1,436 pupils.

Changing demographics led the school board to transform Brownell from an elementary school to a junior high school in 1918.

In February 1930, the decrepit 1884 Brownell School (the "second school") was demolished. Beginning in 1933, a rapidly declining school-age population in the neighborhood led the Cleveland Board of Education to propose that Brownell School be closed. Construction of the Cedar-Central Apartments, erected in 1937 one of the first three public housing projects in the nation, gave brought new students to Brownell and prevented its closure for a time. Calls for the school to close were still made repeatedly over the next 25 years. However, every proposal was met with strong resistance by residents who called Brownell "possibly Cleveland's most historic school". Laura Spelman, the future wife of John D. Rockefeller, was a teacher and assistant principal there for a time between 1963 and 1968. Alumni included Winfred G. Leutner, president of Western Reserve University; Anthony J. Celebrezze, 49th mayor of Cleveland, fifth Secretary of Health and Human Services, and judge on the Court of Appeals for the Sixth Circuit; Frank D. Celebrezze, Cleveland municipal court judge; George J. Matowitz, Chief of the Cleveland Division of Police from 1931 to 1951; James Metzenbaum, prominent local attorney and former Ohio state senator (1935 to 1936 and 1941 to 1942); Mary B. Grossman, Cleveland municipal court judge and the first female municipal court judge in the nation. and Samuel E. Kramer, a Cleveland municipal court judge for six years and Cuyahoga County Court of Common Pleas judge for 35 years.

=== 1958 closure ===
The construction of the Willow Freeway (begun in 1938 and later designated Interstate 77) and Interstate 90 (which began in 1954, and is also known as the Inner Belt Freeway) caused rapid depopulation of the neighborhoods around the Brownell School. After attendance dropped by more than half (to under 200) in the spring of 1958, the Cleveland Board of Education announced the school's permanent closure in June 1958.

The Board of Education initially attempted to sell the buildings. The first attempt, which ended in February 1961, brought only a single bid of $100,000 ($1,100,000 in 2025 dollars). This bid, made by nearby Saint Maron Maronite Catholic Church, was far below the building's appraised value of $240,000 ($2,600,000 in 2025 dollars). A second bid, for $160,000 ($1,700,000 in 2025 dollars) made in April 1961 by real estate investor Samuel C. Jaffe, was also rejected as too low. The board tried to sell the building three more times between April and July 1961, but never received a bid higher than $192,000 ($2,100,000 in 2025 dollars).

=== Tri-C use ===
In July 1961, the state of Ohio adopted legislation allowing counties to establish community colleges, technical institutes, and branches of state universities. The law into effect on October 20, 1961, and three days later the Cuyahoga County Commission established the Cuyahoga Community College (Tri-C). Local community leaders first suggested that Tri-C use the closed Brownell School as a temporary campus just two days after the Ohio legislature passed the bill. Local health and safety officials approved reused of the building, so long as some fire safety improvements were made. The interior of the Brownell School was heavily remodeled over the next nine months, and Tri-C opened its doors on September 23, 1963.

Tri-Co occupied the Brownell School (and other buildings) until the fall of 1968, when the first structure on its new Metropolitan Campus opened. It largely vacated the old school in 1969, when the remainder of the new campus opened. A few Tri-C administrative offices remained in the Brownell School until 1973.

=== Private ownership ===
The Tri-C having vacated the Brownell School, the school district had the structure reappraised in anticipation of selling it again. The new appraisal but the value of the building and land at $165,000 ($800,000 in 2025 dollars). In January 1979, the Cleveland Postal Employees Credit Union successfully bid $145,000 ($600,000 in 2025 dollars) for the structure, placing it in private hands.

The Brownell School complex changed hands a second time in 1983, when local Irrigation Supply Inc. president Dave Vanderwist and his investment partners acquired the property. The three buildings underwent a $1.85 million ($5,500,000 in 2025 dollars) restoration. Two buildings were renovated in 1983, with the third undergoing remodeling in 1984. The restoration was finished in 1985. The exterior of all three building underwent abrasive blasting to clean them, and the interiors were heavily remodeled into office space. The school's basement gymnasium was converted into a racquetball/handball court, and the showers and steam room updated. A small fitness center was added as well. The school's auditorium was renovated into open plan office space (first used by a law firm), and the building skylight repaired and reopened. Reporter Lou Mio of The Plain Dealer newspaper called the renovated structure "a restored jewel" and "one of Cleveland's best-kept secrets".

== Bibliography ==
- Akers, William J. (1901). Cleveland Schools in the Nineteenth Century. Cleveland: W.M. Bayne Printing House.
- Cleveland Landmarks Commission (June 2014). Cleveland Architects Database (PDF) (Report). Cleveland.
- Cleveland Public Schools (1869). Thirty-Second Annual Report of the Board of Education for the School Year Ending Aug. 31, 1868. Cleveland: Fairbanks, Benedict & Co.
- Cleveland Public Schools (1870). Thirty-Third Annual Report of the Board of Education for the School Year Ending Aug. 31, 1869. Cleveland: Fairbanks, Benedict & Co.
- Cleveland Public Schools (1874). Thirty-Seventh Annual Report of the Board of Education for the School Year Ending Aug. 31, 1873. Cleveland: Leader Printing Company.
- Cleveland Public Schools (1885). Forty-Eighth Annual Report of the Board of Education for the School Year Ending August 31, 1884. Cleveland: Leader Printing Company. hdl:2027/chi.098181434.
- Cleveland Public Schools (1886). Forty-Ninth Annual Report of the Board of Education for the School Year Ending August 31, 1885. Cleveland: Publishing House of the Evangelical Association.
- Cleveland Public Schools (1887). Fiftieth Annual Report of the Board of Education for the School Year Ending August 31, 1886. Cleveland: Plain Dealer Publishing Company. hdl:2027/chi.098181557.
- Cleveland Public Schools (1902). Sixty-Fifth Annual Report of the Board of Education for the School Year Ending Aug. 31, 1901. Cleveland: W.M. Bayne Printing House.
- Cleveland Public Schools (1903). Sixty-Sixth Annual Report of the Board of Education for the School Year Ending Aug. 31, 1902. Cleveland: The Cleveland Printing and Publishing Company. hdl:2027/chi.098181939.
- Cleveland Public Schools (1904). Sixty-Seventh Annual Report of the Board of Education for the School Year Ending Aug. 31, 1903. Cleveland: W.M. Bayne Printing House. hdl:2027/osu.32435058832593.
- Cleveland Public Schools (1905). Sixty-Eighth Annual Report of the Board of Education for the School Year Ending Aug. 31, 1904. Cleveland: W.M. Bayne Printing House. hdl:2027/nyp.33433075986046.
- Hatcher, Harlan; Durham, Frank (1955). Giant From the Wilderness: The Story of a City and Its Industries. Cleveland: World Publishing Co.
- Martorana, S.V.; Palmer, James K. (February 1962). "Recent State Legislation Affecting Junior Colleges". Junior College Journal. pp. 316–330.
- Van Tassell, David D.; Grabowski, John J., eds. (1987). The Encyclopedia of Cleveland History. Bloomington, Ind.: Indiana University Press. ISBN 9780253313034.
