= Ansel Road Apartment Buildings Historic District =

Historic district in Ohio, United States

- U.S. National Register of Historic Places
- U.S. Historic district
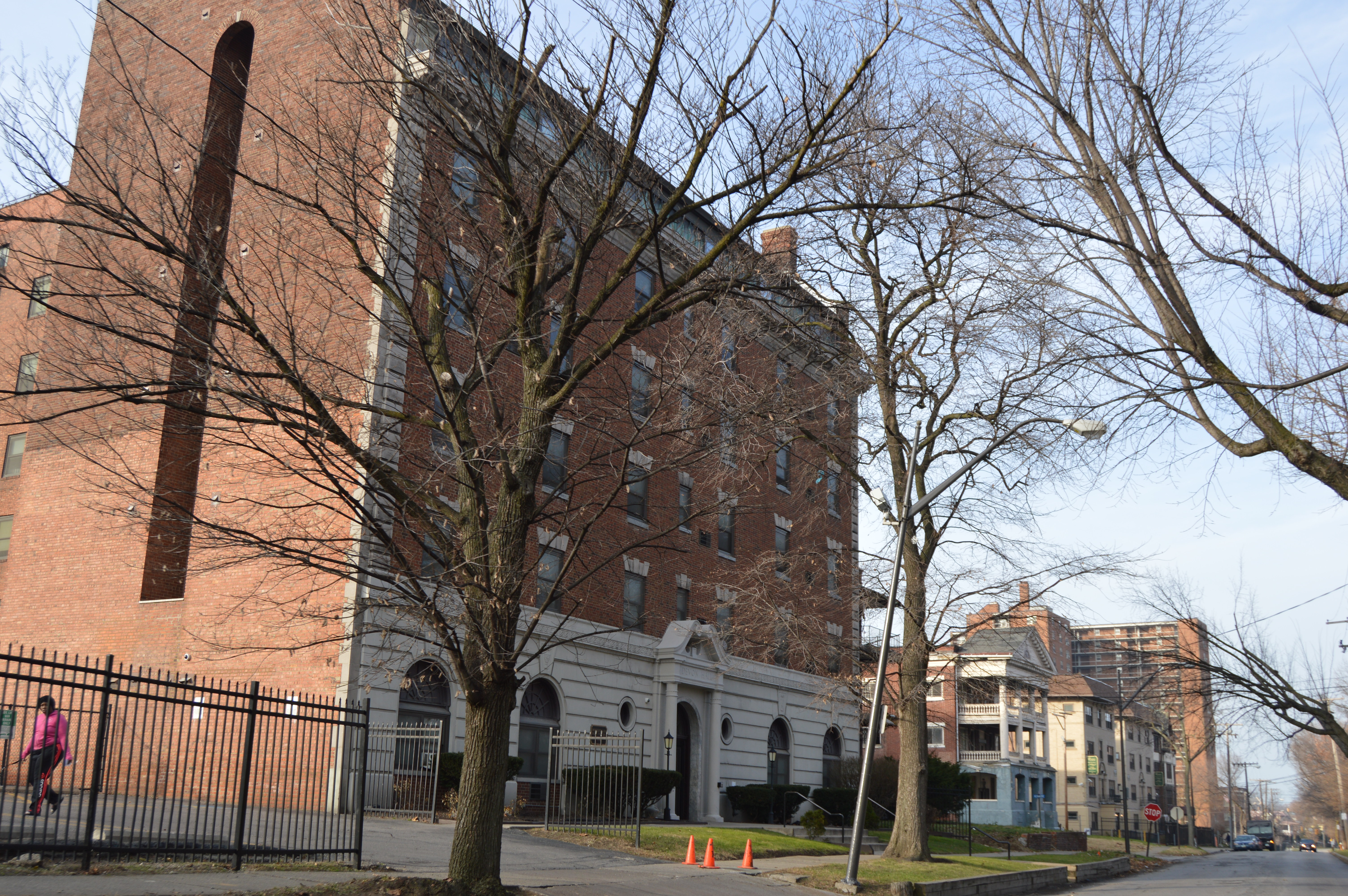
- Ansel Road Apartments

- Location within Cleveland Location within Ohio Location within the United States
- Location: 1588 to 1532 Ansel Road; 9500 and 9501 Wade Park Avenue; Cleveland, Ohio
- Coordinates: 41°30′52.9″N 81°37′11.1″W
- Area: 13 acres (5.3 ha)
- Architectural style: Colonial Revival, Mission Revival, Neoclassical, Renaissance Revival, Tudor Revival
- NRHP reference No.: 08000589
- Added to NRHP: July 2, 1987

The Ansel Road Apartment Buildings Historic District is a historic residential district in the Hough neighborhood of Cleveland, Ohio, in the United States. The district consists of eight contributing and one non-contributing multi-family residential buildings built between 1900 and 1949. The area was designated a National Historic District and listed on the National Register of Historic Places on July 2, 2008.

== History of the district ==
In 1897, Cleveland resident John D. Rockefeller donated about 130 acres (530,000 m^{2}) of his personal property to the city of Cleveland. This land, which ran on either side of Doan Brook, was named Rockefeller Park, and became one of the city's premiere parks. Ansel Road was one of the major thoroughfares in the area. It ran along the western heights overlooking the broad Doan Brook valley, and was one of the areas earliest roads. It was paved in 1907, and became a heavily traveled boulevard along Rockefeller Park.

With the establishment of Rockefeller Park and its gradual development over the next 30 years, Ansel Road became one of Cleveland's choicest neighborhoods. Relatively large middle-class and upper-middle-class homes were built on the west side of the street, facing the park. In 1899, the Wade Park Avenue Bridge (designed by prominent Cleveland architect Charles F. Schweinfurth) opened. This bridge carried East Boulevard (later Liberty Boulevard, and still later Wade Park Avenue) over the park, and helped to provide greater accessibility to the neighborhood.

Beginning in 1910 and ending in 1928, several apartment buildings of varying size were built between Talbot Avenue and Wade Avenue. The first of these was the 1910 Overlook, a luxury three-story apartment building with units ranging from three to seven rooms in size. This was followed in 1914 by The Parkcliff, a similarly sized structure. In 1921, as restrictions on building materials ended with the conclusion of World War I, the first of the two buildings which constituted the much larger Wade Chateau Apartments opened on Wade Park Avenue. This was followed by two large Max Weis-designed apartments (now Regency Square Apartments) around a common court in the middle of the district. Devon Hall followed in 1926 (now the Rockefeller Park Towers), anchoring the south portion of the district. A small infill apartment building, now known as The Lynette, completed construction of this unique district in 1928.

- Rockefeller Park Towers, 1588 Ansel Road—This six-story apartment building was designed by architect Herbert Bishop Beidler for the Park Hall Improvement Company, and completed in 1926. It was originally known as Devon Hall, a residential hotel for young women. It was later the Evangeline Home, an apartment house for homeless, unwed pregnant, and orphan girls run by the Salvation Army. The building was sold in 1961 to the Alpha Kappa Alpha African American sorority, which used it as a training center.
- The Parkcliff, 1580 Ansel Road—This luxury three-story apartment building was completed in 1914.
- The Overlook, 1568 Ansel Road—This luxury three-story apartment building was completed in 1910.
- Regency Square Apartments, 1560 Ansel Road—This four-story apartment building was completed in 1925. It was designed by architect Max Weis for Mendel Narosny, and cost $250,000. A companion building opened at 1556 Ansel Road in 1927.
- Linnette Apartments, 1552 Ansel Road—This four-story apartment building was completed in 1928.
- Wade Park Apartments (non-contributing property), 9500 Wade Park Avenue
- Wade Chateau Apartments, 9501 Wade Park Avenue—These two four-story apartment buildings were completed in 1921.
