= Phillip Gaensslen House =

Historic house in Ohio, United States

- U.S. National Register of Historic Places
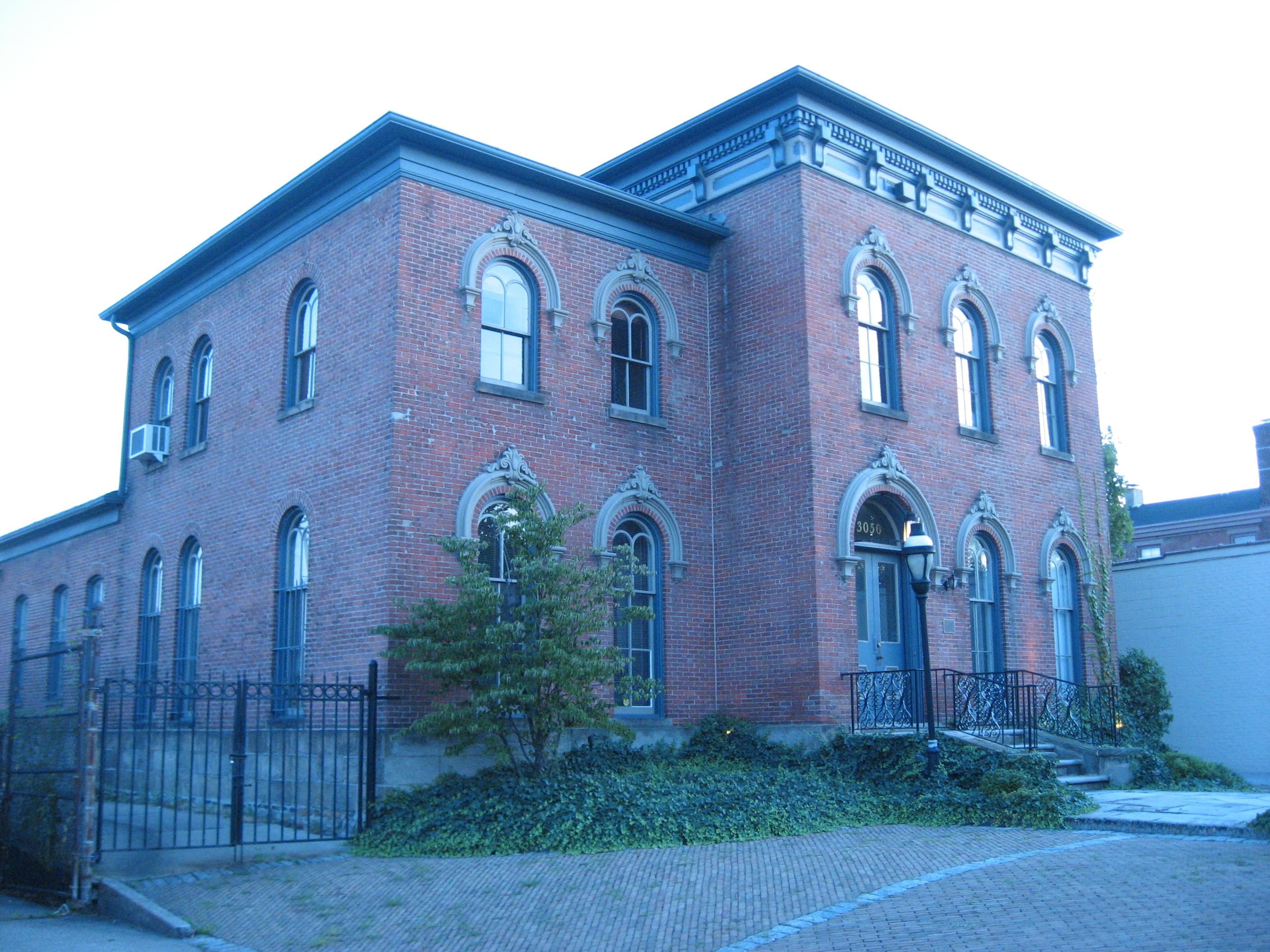
- Street view of the Phillip Gaensslen House

- Location within Cleveland Location within Ohio Location within the United States
- Location: 3050 Prospect Avenue, Cleveland, Ohio
- Coordinates: 41°30′3″N 81°39′58″W
- Area: less than one acre
- Built: 1870
- Architectural style: Italianate
- MPS: Upper Prospect MRA
- NRHP reference No.: 84000227
- Added to NRHP: November 1, 1984

The Phillip Gaensslen House is a historic house in Cleveland, Ohio, United States, located at 3050 Prospect Avenue east of downtown. Built in about 1870, the Italianate house features a primarily brick exterior and a stone foundation. As suggested by its name, the house was constructed for Phillip Gaensslen, who owned Cleveland's only German-language newspaper. After the Gaensslen family lived in the house, it served a succession of different organizations: after being a home for unwed mothers, the property was used as a church for a time. From the 1960s to the 1980s, on the other hand, it was a headquarters of a steel fabrication company.

Historic preservation has played an important part of the Gaensslen House's recent history: since the 1990s, the house has been restored to an older appearance, and it has become recognized for its historic significance. Along with several other nearby houses, it was listed on the National Register of Historic Places on November 1, 1984; it has also received the AIA's Restoration Award and is listed on the Cleveland Landmark Register. Today, the house serves as the offices of TG Embedded Systems, a wireless Internet company.
