= Shaker Heights Public Library =

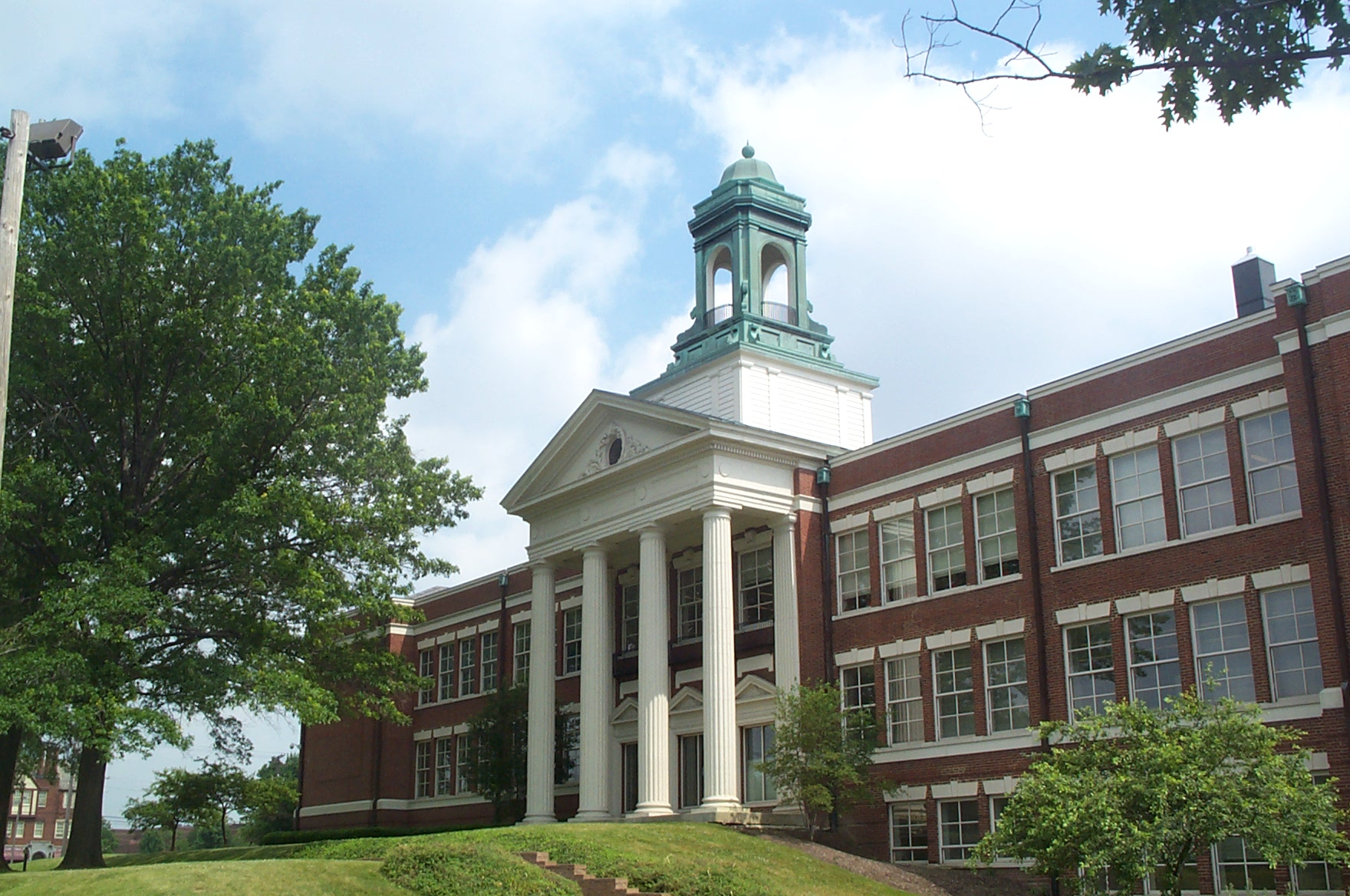
- Main Library
- 41.466°N 81.567°W
- Location: Shaker Heights, Ohio, United States
- Established: 1937
- Branches: 1 (Bertram Woods)

Access and use
- Population served: 33,000

Other information
- Director: Amy Switzer
- Website: http://www.shakerlibrary.org

Shaker Heights Public Library is a library district in eastern Cuyahoga County, Ohio serving the city of Shaker Heights and that portion of the City of Cleveland, known as Shaker Square, which falls within the Shaker Heights City School District. This service area encompasses 7.5 square miles (19 km^{2}) with a population of approximately 33,000. Shaker Library consists of the Main Library, located at 16500 Van Aken Boulevard, and the Bertram Woods Branch Library, 20600 Fayette Road.

The library has circulated as many as 1,365,000 items annually, making it one of America's busiest libraries on a per capita basis. It has also been named a 5-Star Library by Library Journal and received a Top 10 ranking in Hennen's American Public Library Ratings.

Shaker Library is governed by a seven-member Board of Trustees. Board members are appointed by the Shaker Heights Board of Education and serve seven-year terms. The first Library Board met on April 27, 1937 and library service began in a storefront building on Lee Road in 1938. The original Main Library structure (now the Stephanie Tubbs Jones Community Building) was opened nearby on January 3, 1951. A branch library was opened in 1960 on property purchased in part through a bequest from railroad engineer Bertram Woods. A new Main Library was dedicated in the renovated Moreland Elementary School building in 1993. A second renovation began in 2020 and was completed in 2021.

Shaker Library is a member of the CLEVNET Library Consortium headquartered at the Cleveland Public Library. CLEVNET is a group of more than 40 library systems in a dozen counties across northern Ohio, which share an automation system that provides a joint catalog and access to downloadable material and other electronic resources. Through the Greater Access Card, CLEVNET cardholders and Cuyahoga County Public Library cardholders may borrow materials from any CLEVNET member library or branch of the county system.
