= Weizer Building =

Weizer Building may refer to:

- Weizer Building (8935 Buckeye Road, Cleveland, Ohio), listed on the National Register of Historic Places (NRHP)
- Weizer Building (11801 Buckeye Road, Cleveland, Ohio), also listed on the NRHP
