= Shaker Museum =

Shaker Museum may refer to a museum about Shakers in the United States:

- Shaker Museum | Mount Lebanon, in New Lebanon, New York
- Enfield Shaker Museum, in Enfield, New Hampshire
- Shaker Museum at South Union, in Auburn, Kentucky
- Shaker Historical Museum, in Shaker Heights, Ohio

See also

- Fruitlands Museum, a Shaker museum in Harvard, Massachusetts
