= Shaker Village =

Shaker Village may refer to:

- Pleasant Hill, Kentucky, home of Shaker Village of Pleasant Hill
- Shaker Village (Sabbathday Lake, Maine)
- Hancock Shaker Village, Hancock, Massachusetts
- Harvard Shaker Village Historic District, Harvard, Massachusetts
- Shirley Shaker Village, Shirley, Massachusetts
- Canterbury Shaker Village, Canterbury, New Hampshire
- Shaker Village Historic District (Shaker Heights, Ohio)
