= Shaker Heights, Ohio =

- City
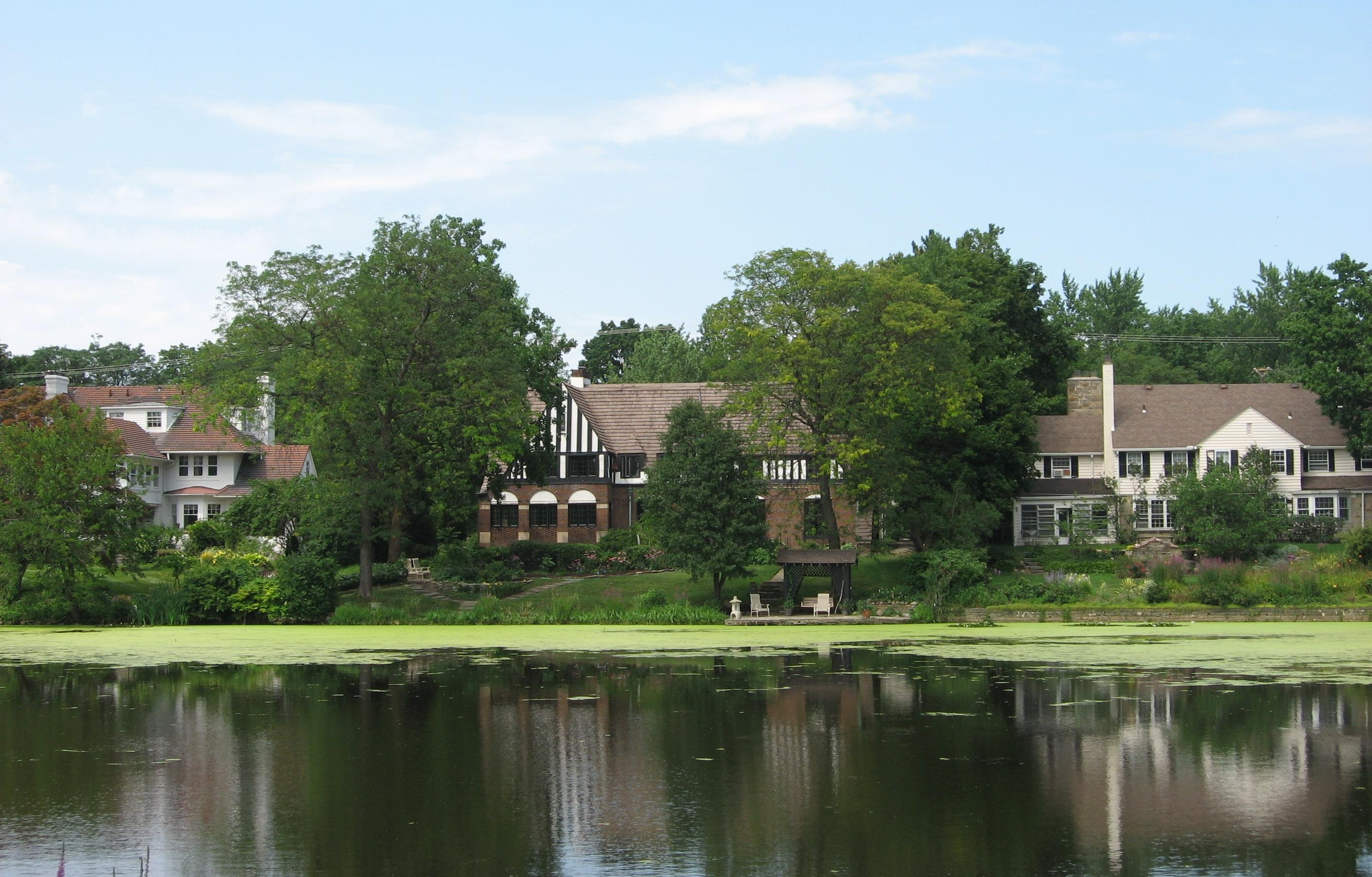
- Shaker Village Historic District
- Interactive map of Shaker Heights, Ohio
- Location within Ohio Location within the United States
- Coordinates: 41°28′35″N 81°33′6″W
- Country: United States
- State: Ohio
- County: Cuyahoga
- Established: 1911
- Incorporated: 1912

Government
  - Mayor: David Weiss (D)

Area
  - Total: 6.33 sq mi (16.40 km^{2})
  - Land: 6.29 sq mi (16.29 km^{2})
  - Water: 0.042 sq mi (0.11 km^{2})
- Elevation: 1,050 ft (320 m)

Population (2020)
  - Total: 29,439
  - Density: 4,679.3/sq mi (1,806.68/km^{2})
- Time zone: UTC-5 (Eastern (EST))
  - Summer (DST): UTC-4 (EDT)
- ZIP codes: 44118, 44120, 44122
- Area code: 216
- FIPS code: 39-71682
- GNIS feature ID: 1065308
- Website: www.shakerheightsoh.gov

Shaker Heights is a city in Cuyahoga County, Ohio, United States. The population was 29,439 at the 2020 census. Shaker Heights is an inner-ring streetcar suburb of Cleveland, abutting the eastern edge of the city's limits. It is a planned community developed by the Van Sweringen brothers, railroad moguls who envisioned the community as a suburban retreat from the industrial inner city of Cleveland.

== History ==
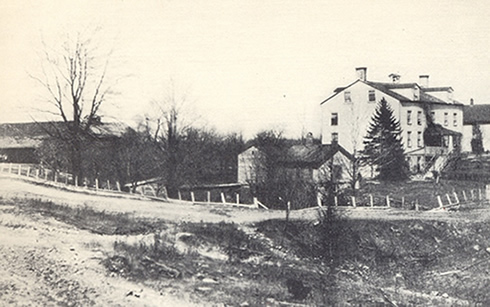
A house at the North Union Shaker Site

Shaker Heights is home to the oldest house in Cuyahoga County, built in 1817 by Moses Warren. The name "Shaker Heights" has origins in two local sources. The community was laid out on land formerly owned by the North Union Community of the United Society of Believers in Christ's Second Appearing, more commonly known as Shakers. "Heights" refers to the plateau east of Cleveland that rises sharply in elevation from 582 feet above sea level at the base of the Cedar Glen Parkway rising to 950 feet above sea level in nearby Cleveland Heights; Shaker Heights' elevation is 1,050 feet above sea level.

Ralph Russell established the North Union Shaker Settlement in 1822 with just over 80 individuals. Between 1826 and 1854, the group dammed Doan Brook, which made Upper and Lower Lake, and established three grist and a sawmills. The colony peaked around 1850 with about 300 settlers, but subsequently faded away and was closed in 1889.

In 1905, the land was bought by brothers M.J. and O.P. Van Sweringen who envisioned the first garden styled suburb in Ohio for the site. The brothers constructed homes, set aside land for churches and schools, and planted trees. Originally referred to as Shaker Village, the community was incorporated in 1912 and reached city status in 1931.

Shaker Heights is known for its stringent building codes and zoning laws, which have helped to maintain the community's housing stock and identity throughout the years. Approximately seventy-five percent of the city of Shaker Heights is listed on the National Register of Historic Places as the Shaker Village Historic District.

Efforts toward racial integration began in the late 1950s, with neighbors in the Ludlow Elementary School area working together to make integration successful. As a result, Shaker Heights avoided many of the problems created from practices such as blockbusting and white flight. In 1986, the city began the Fund for the Future of Shaker Heights, which offered loans for down payments for residents buying homes in segregated neighborhoods, which helped to create multi-ethnic neighborhoods. Today, the city maintains a housing assistance office that works with home buyers to achieve and maintain neighborhood integration.

Shaker Heights was a finalist for the All-America City Award in 1989.

== Geography ==
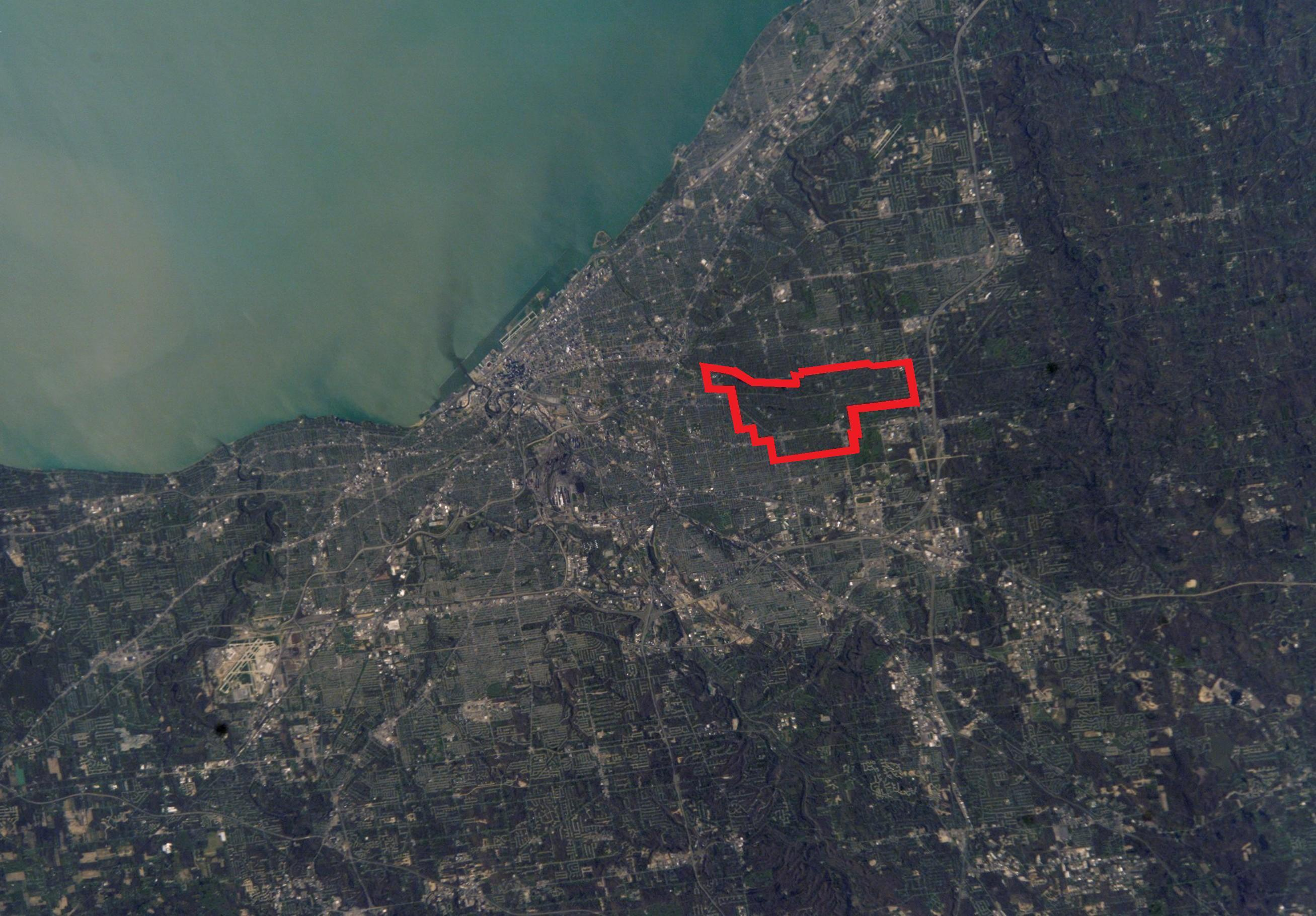
A NASA photo of Greater Cleveland, showing the relative location of Shaker Heights

Shaker Heights is located at 41°28′35″N 81°33′6″W. According to the United States Census Bureau, the city has a total area of 6.32 square miles (16.37 km^{2}), of which 6.28 square miles (16.27 km^{2}) is land and 0.04 square miles (0.10 km^{2}) is water.

Shaker Heights is roughly 1,050 feet (320 m) above sea level, and is located about 6 miles (10 km) inland from Lake Erie. Shaker Heights is drained by the Doan Brook watershed, and has several small artificial lakes: Horseshoe Lake, Green Lake, Lower Shaker Lake, and Marshall Lake. Horseshoe Lake and Lower Shaker Lake had been dammed by the Shakers, while developers added Green Lake and Marshall Lake, the latter named after drugstore chain owner W. A. Marshall, at a later point.

Shaker Heights is one of Greater Cleveland's older inner-ring or "first" suburbs, and borders Cleveland, Cleveland Heights, University Heights, Beachwood, Highland Hills, and Warrensville Heights. Shaker Heights is a member of the Northeast Ohio First Suburbs Consortium.

=== Neighborhoods ===
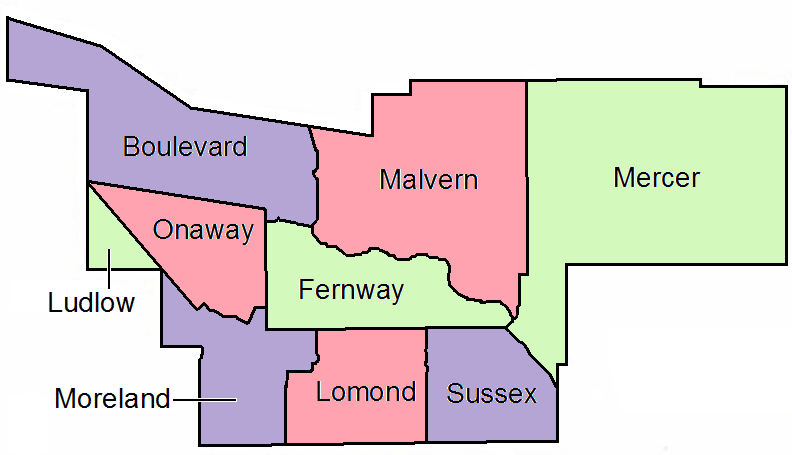
A map of the neighborhoods in Shaker Heights

There are nine neighborhoods in Shaker Heights, all of which were named after the nine original elementary schools. These neighborhoods are:

- Boulevard, located in northwest Shaker Heights, is near Cleveland's University Circle neighborhood, and borders Shaker Square. The Nature Center at Shaker Lakes is located in this neighborhood.
- Fernway is located in the middle of Shaker Heights, north of Van Aken Boulevard, and south of Shaker Heights Country Club.
- Lomond is located in the south-central part of the city.
- Ludlow is the smallest neighborhood and is located in the western portion of the city. Half of the neighborhood lies in Shaker Heights, while the other half is in the Shaker Heights School district of Cleveland.
- Malvern is mostly residential and is the location of Hathaway Brown School. The Hanna Perkins Center, a child development center, occupies the former Malvern school building.
- Mercer, located in northeast Shaker Heights, is the largest neighborhood. The area is also home to Shaker Heights Middle School (previously Byron Junior High School), and the private schools University School and Laurel School. The Bertram Woods branch of the Shaker Heights Public Library is located here.
- Moreland is located in southwest Shaker Heights. The former Moreland school building now houses the Shaker Heights Public Library Main Branch.
- Onaway is home to Shaker Heights High School, and the former Woodbury Junior High School Building.
- Sussex is located in southeast part of the city and is the location of the Tower East office building and post office.

Shaker Square is in the city of Cleveland, though a September 1912 agreement between Shaker Heights and Cleveland school districts places it in the Shaker Heights City School District.

== Demographics ==
Historical population
Census	Pop.	Note	%±
1920	1,616		—
1930	17,783		1,000.4%
1940	23,393		31.5%
1950	28,222		20.6%
1960	36,460		29.2%
1970	36,306		−0.4%
1980	32,487		−10.5%
1990	30,831		−5.1%
2000	29,405		−4.6%
2010	28,448		−3.3%
2020	29,439		3.5%
U.S. Decennial Census

=== Racial and ethnic composition ===
Shaker Heights city, Ohio – Racial and ethnic composition Note: the US Census treats Hispanic/Latino as an ethnic category. This table excludes Latinos from the racial categories and assigns them to a separate category. Hispanics/Latinos may be of any race.
Race / Ethnicity (NH = Non-Hispanic)	Pop 2000	Pop 2010	Pop 2020	% 2000	% 2010	% 2020
White alone (NH)	17,434	15,270	15,672	59.29%	53.68%	53.24%
Black or African American alone (NH)	9,985	10,446	9,915	33.96%	36.72%	33.68%
Native American or Alaska Native alone (NH)	19	33	18	0.06%	0.12%	0.06%
Asian alone (NH)	926	1,300	1,288	3.15%	4.57%	4.38%
Native Hawaiian or Pacific Islander alone (NH)	4	3	7	0.01%	0.01%	0.02%
Other race alone (NH)	79	84	186	0.27%	0.30%	0.63%
Mixed race or Multiracial (NH)	619	686	1,412	2.11%	2.41%	4.80%
Hispanic or Latino (any race)	339	626	941	1.15%	2.20%	3.20%
Total	29,405	28,448	29,439	100.00%	100.00%	100.00%

=== 2020 census ===
As of the 2020 census, Shaker Heights had a population of 29,439. The median age was 40.9 years. 24.0% of residents were under the age of 18 and 19.4% of residents were 65 years of age or older. For every 100 females there were 84.2 males, and for every 100 females age 18 and over there were 79.9 males age 18 and over.

100.0% of residents lived in urban areas, while 0.0% lived in rural areas.

There were 12,416 households in Shaker Heights, of which 31.8% had children under the age of 18 living in them. Of all households, 44.4% were married-couple households, 15.9% were households with a male householder and no spouse or partner present, and 35.5% were households with a female householder and no spouse or partner present. About 33.4% of all households were made up of individuals and 15.4% had someone living alone who was 65 years of age or older.

There were 13,564 housing units, of which 8.5% were vacant. The homeowner vacancy rate was 2.6% and the rental vacancy rate was 9.3%.

Racial composition as of the 2020 census
Race	Number	Percent
White	15,842	53.8%
Black or African American	9,996	34.0%
American Indian and Alaska Native	29	0.1%
Asian	1,296	4.4%
Native Hawaiian and Other Pacific Islander	7	0.0%
Some other race	346	1.2%
Two or more races	1,923	6.5%
Hispanic or Latino (of any race)	941	3.2%

=== 2010 census ===
As of the 2010 census, there were 28,448 people, 11,840 households, and 7,716 families residing in the city. The population density was 4,529.9 inhabitants per square mile (1,749.0/km^{2}). There were 13,318 housing units at an average density of 2,120.7 per square mile (818.8/km^{2}). The racial makeup of the city was 55.0% White, 37.1% African American, 0.1% Native American, 4.6% Asian, 0.6% from other races, and 2.7% from two or more races. Hispanic or Latino of any race were 2.2% of the population.

There were 11,840 households, of which 34.4% had children under the age of 18 living with them, 46.8% were married couples living together, 15.3% had a female householder with no husband present, 3.1% had a male householder with no wife present, and 34.8% were non-families. 31.1% of all households were made up of individuals, and 12.6% had someone living alone who was 65 years of age or older. The average household size was 2.39 and the average family size was 3.03.

The median age in the city was 40.9 years. 26.7% of residents were under the age of 18; 5.8% were between the ages of 18 and 24; 23.1% were from 25 to 44; 29% were from 45 to 64; and 15.5% were 65 years of age or older. The gender makeup of the city was 45.2% male and 54.8% female.

The median income for a household in the city was $76,476, and the median income for a family was $105,660. The per capita income for the city was $47,360. About 5.3% of families and 8.6% of the population were below the poverty line, including 8.1% of those under age 18 and 6.5% of those age 65 or over. The unemployment rate in the city is 5.4%, one of the lowest rates for individual cities included in data provided by the Ohio Department of Job and Family Services.

About 93.5% of residents speak English natively at home, while 1.6% speak Spanish, 1.2% speak French, 0.7% speak Chinese, and 3.0% speak another language, including German, Russian and Arabic.

Educationally, Shaker Heights is above the national, state, and local averages for residents who have attained a bachelor's, master's, or above a master's degree. As of the 2010 Census, 64.5% of the city's population over the age of 25 had obtained a college degree compared to 28.6% of the same population in Cuyahoga County, 24.1% statewide, and 27.9% nationally.

== Government and politics ==
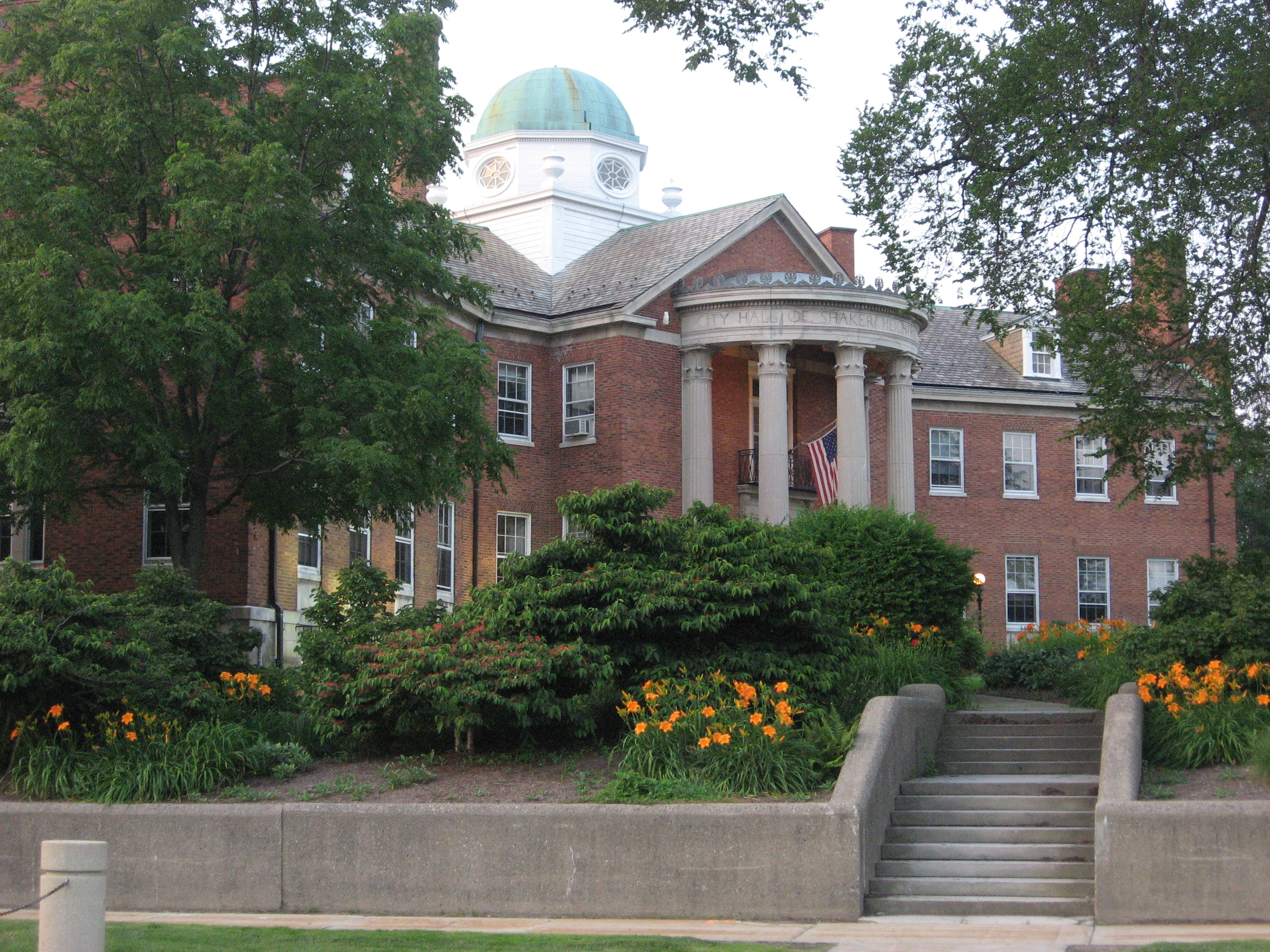
Shaker Heights City Hall

The Shaker Heights City Charter was adopted in 1931 and revised in 1974, 1986, and 1999. This charter provides for a mayor and seven members of a city council, elected on an at-large, non-partisan basis. The current mayor of Shaker Heights is David Weiss. He was elected in 2018 after serving briefly as interim mayor to fulfill the term of the previous three-term mayor Earl Leiken, who resigned to take the position of chief of staff with Cuyahoga County Executive Armond Budish. In 2019, David Weiss ran unopposed and was re-elected to a four-year term as mayor. He was re-elected to a second full term in a landslide in 2023. Council members are elected to four-year terms, with four of the elections coinciding with mayoral elections and the other three two years later in order to stagger terms.

The Neo-Georgian city hall, designed by Charles Schneider, was built in 1930. Over the years it has hosted 12 Keys to the city ceremonies starting in 1935 to Oris Paxton Van Sweringen and ending in 1993 to Dean Yoder.

Shaker Heights is a stronghold of the Democratic Party, with Joe Biden winning nearly 90% of vote in the most recent Presidential election. Shaker Heights is entirely within the Eleventh Congressional District, a seat in the House of Representatives, represented by Shontel Brown (D). At the state level, Shaker Heights is located within the 21st senatorial district, represented by Kent Smith (D) in the Ohio Senate, and in the 22nd District of the Ohio House of Representatives, represented by Juanita Brent (D).

== Education ==
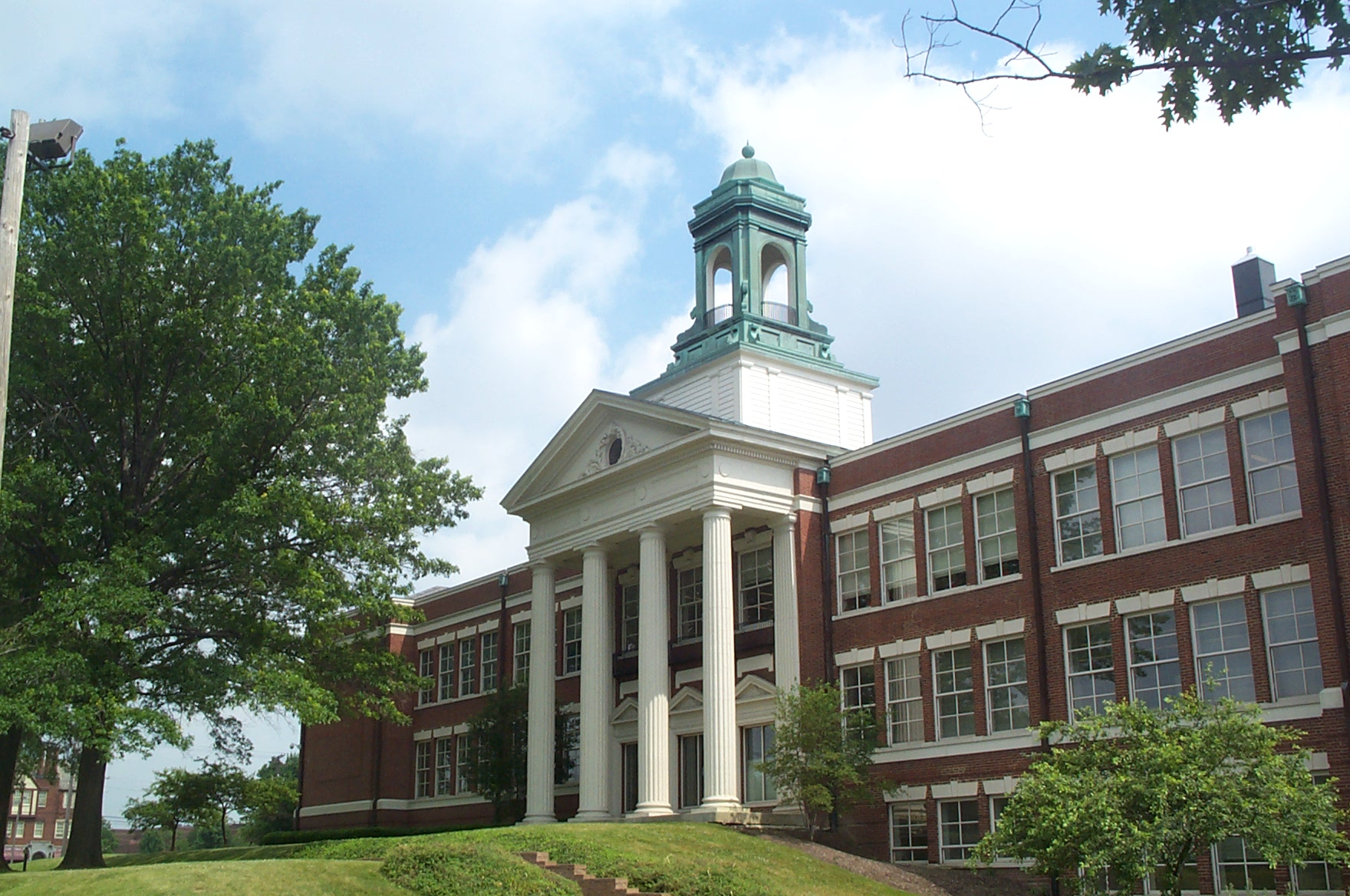
The main branch of the Shaker Heights Public Library, a member of the CLEVNET consortium

Publicly, Shaker Heights is served by the Shaker Heights City School District, a K-12 district with an enrollment of about 5,600 students in eight total schools. There are five lower elementary schools, Fernway, Mercer, Boulevard, Lomond and Onaway; an upper elementary school, Woodbury Elementary School; Shaker Heights Middle School; and Shaker Heights High School. The district estimates that roughly 90% of Shaker graduates attend college, and has been recognized for its efforts to increase neighborhood integration. In the 1950s, the public school system was rated in the top ten nationally. According to the 2007-2008 State of Ohio Report Card, Shaker scored 97.1 out of a possible 120. The district is listed as "Effective," the third tier on a 6 tier scale. On the other hand, since 1995, 9-17% of seniors at Shaker Heights High School have been recipients of National Merit Scholarship awards, and in 2008, the high school had twice as many National Merit Scholarship winners as any other public school in the state. This can possibly be explained in a 2009 survey of the school, which said that Shaker Heights High School "is really two schools – one school with students in an outstanding Advanced Placement program and one school with students with academic needs."

Private schools in the city include Laurel School, Hathaway Brown School, and the lower campus of University School. There is also a parochial school in Shaker, St. Dominic School.

John Carroll University is partially located in Shaker Heights, with the university owning several residential and commercial properties in the city. Additionally, Shaker Heights is in proximity to University Circle, which is home to Case Western Reserve University, The Cleveland Institute of Art, and the Cleveland Institute of Music.

The Japanese Language School of Cleveland (クリーブランド日本語補習校, Kurīburando Nihongo Hoshūkō), a weekend Japanese school, holds its classes at the Shaker Heights campus of the Laurel School.

== Media ==
Shaker Heights is the city of license for CBS affiliate WOIO, channel 19, which has its studios and offices in Cleveland. Shaker Heights news appears in the Cleveland daily newspaper, The Plain Dealer, as well as The Shakerite, the Shaker Heights High School student newspaper. The Sun Press, a weekly, provides local coverage of Shaker Heights and neighboring Beachwood, Cleveland Heights, and University Heights.

== Transportation ==
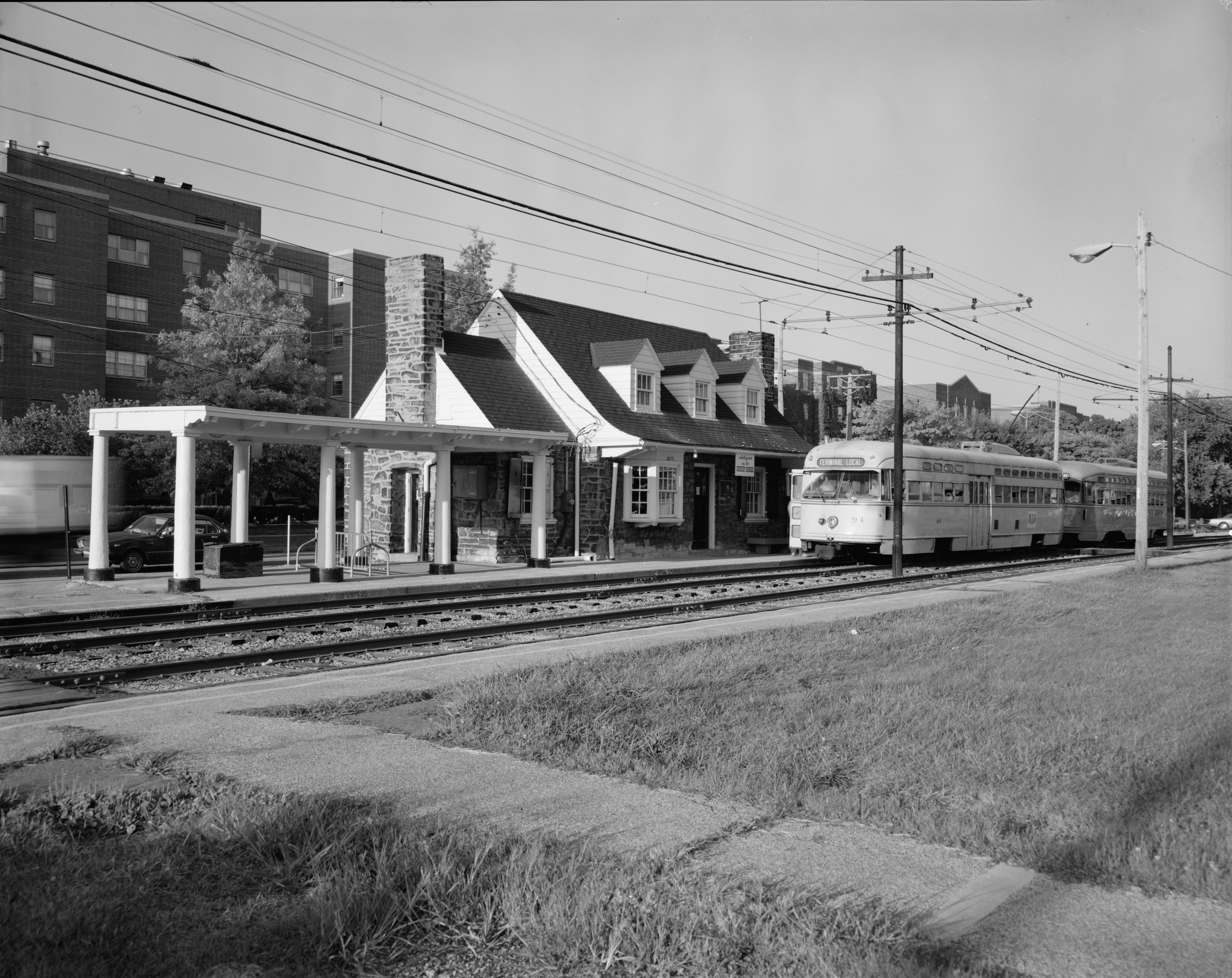
A Blue Line streetcar at the Lynnfield station. This style of car, the PCC streetcar, was replaced in 1981 with the Breda LRV car.

Two light rail lines of the GCRTA pass through and terminate in Shaker Heights. The Blue Line cuts through the median of Van Aken Boulevard, while the Green Line cuts through the median of Shaker Boulevard. The Blue and Green lines provide direct rail service to Cleveland, and are each the direct successors of former streetcar services established in 1920 and 1913 respectively. The city of Shaker Heights directly owned and operated these Shaker Heights Rapid Transit services between 1944 and 1975.

== In popular culture ==
Shaker Heights is the hometown of How I Met Your Mother protagonist Ted Mosby (despite being attributed to Cleveland on occasion), Ward Cleaver from the TV series Leave it to Beaver, and the World Wrestling Federation's Beverly Brothers.

The city is the principal setting for Celeste Ng’s book Little Fires Everywhere, as well as its TV adaptation. Shaker Heights and its history are also the setting and a main plot point in No One's Home by D.M. Pulley.

Shaker Heights is the setting of the song called "Frankenguest" in the musical Dear Edwina.

== See also ==
- Nature Center at Shaker Lakes
- The Battle of Shaker Heights (film set in Shaker Heights)
