= Nature Center at Shaker Lakes =

Education centre in Cleveland, Ohio, US

Coordinates: 41°29′6″N 81°34′27″W

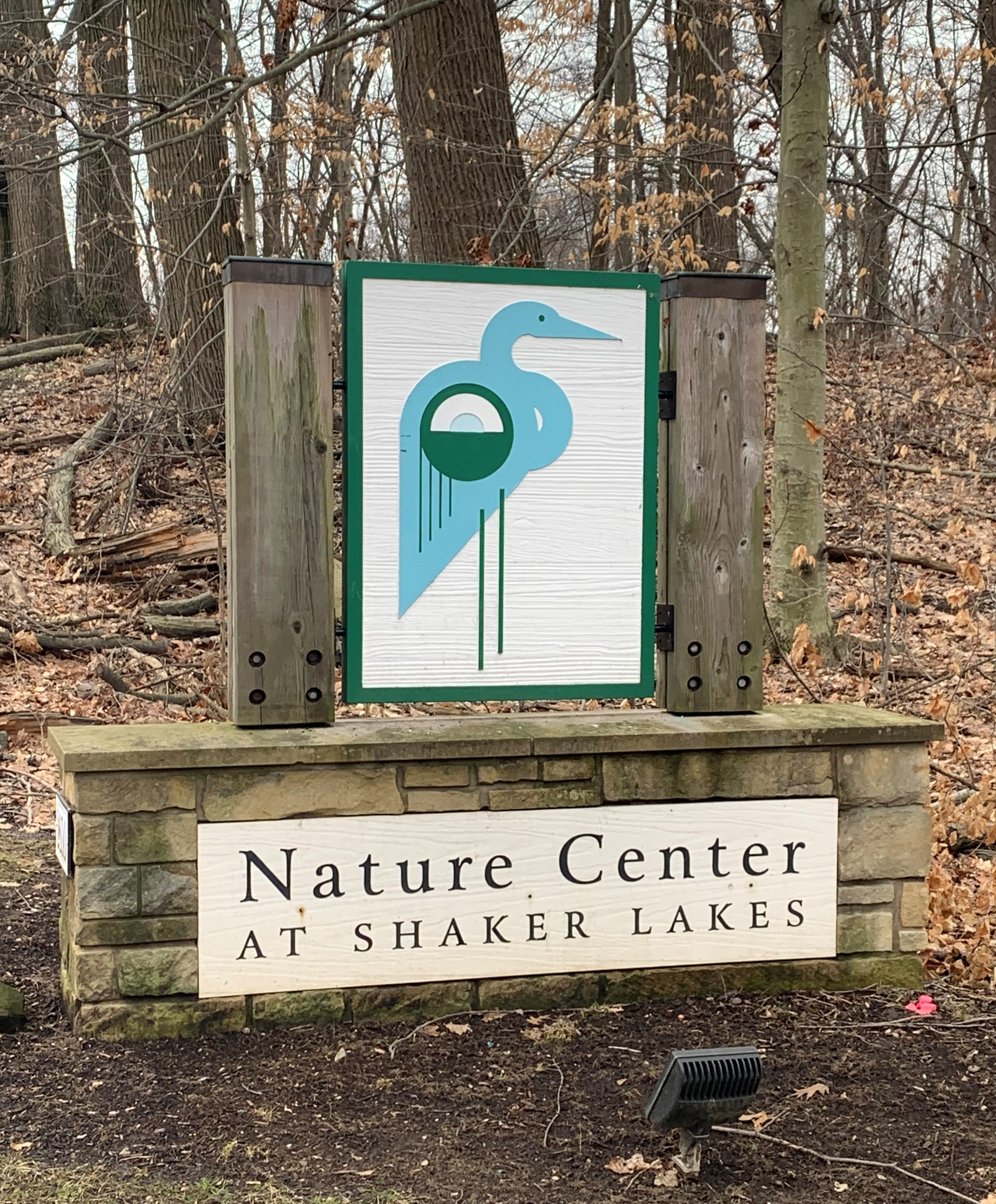
- The Charley Harper-inspired heron greets visitors daily from dawn to dusk.
- Founded: 1966; 60 years ago
- Type: 501(c)(3) nonprofit
- Tax ID no.: 34-6576569
- Purpose: Conservation, education
- Headquarters: 2600 S Park Blvd
- Location: Cleveland, Ohio, United States
- Region served: Shaker Lakes
- Services: School programs
- Board chair: Meg Hunter
- Main organ: Board
- Revenue: $1.82 m (2022)
- Expenses: $1.87 m (2022)
- Funding: Grants, program services
- Staff: 36 (2022)
- Website: www.shakerlakes.org

The Nature Center at Shaker Lakes is a nonprofit organization in Shaker Heights, Ohio, United States. It works to conserve a natural area, educate visitors about nature, and promote better environmental stewardship. It was founded in 1966 as the result of a volunteer effort to preserve the Shaker Parklands from becoming the route for a new freeway connecting Cleveland's east side to Downtown Cleveland.

The nature center offers curriculum-related school programs, including an early childhood program for several east side school districts and the Cleveland Metropolitan School District. Walkers, runners, and birdwatchers use the trails for exercise and recreation.

The center is home to many wildlife and plant species living in a variety of natural habitats, including marsh, brook, field, forest, and ravine.

The Nature Center's trails do not allow dogs, except service dogs. There are trails around the Nature Center that allow dogs such as the Lower Lake Trail.

== Shaker Lakes ==
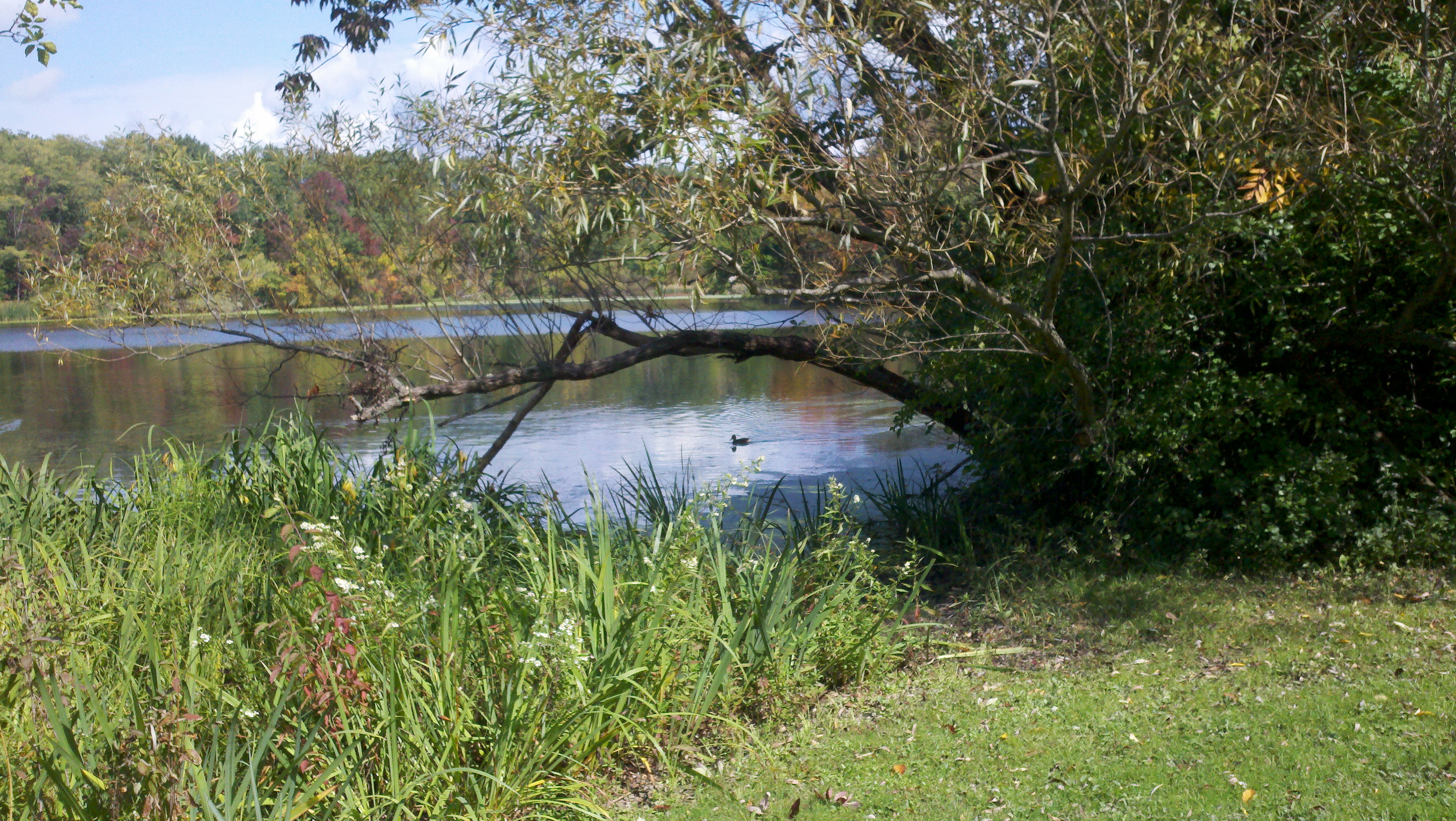
Horseshoe Lake at North Union Historic Site

The Shaker Lakes are a system of parklands, connected to the Doan Brook Parklands, through which the Doan Brook runs. The Shaker Lakes Park is a natural and semiwild area located at the intersection of three municipalities. It included two lakes created by the Shakers at the North Union Shaker Site when they dammed Doan Brook to power their industries. The swamp and woodland areas constitute a small wilderness in the heaviest concentration of population in Ohio, making it available for study and recreation. It is available to people of Greater Cleveland year-round for walking, photography, painting, nature study, rest, and family recreation.

The Nature Center at Shaker Lakes did not manage or control Horseshoe or Lower lakes. These lakes were/are managed by NEORSD.

The nature center serves much of Cleveland's east side, including the Shaker Square and Buckeye neighborhoods. It also serves eastside suburbs of Cleveland, including Shaker Heights, Cleveland Heights, University Heights, East Cleveland, Beachwood, and South Euclid.

== Programs and volunteer opportunities ==
The Nature Center at Shaker Lakes provides students with school field trips, year-round Outdoor Adventure Camps, and outdoor classes and other educational nature-centric events and programs, including the annual Nature at Night benefit.

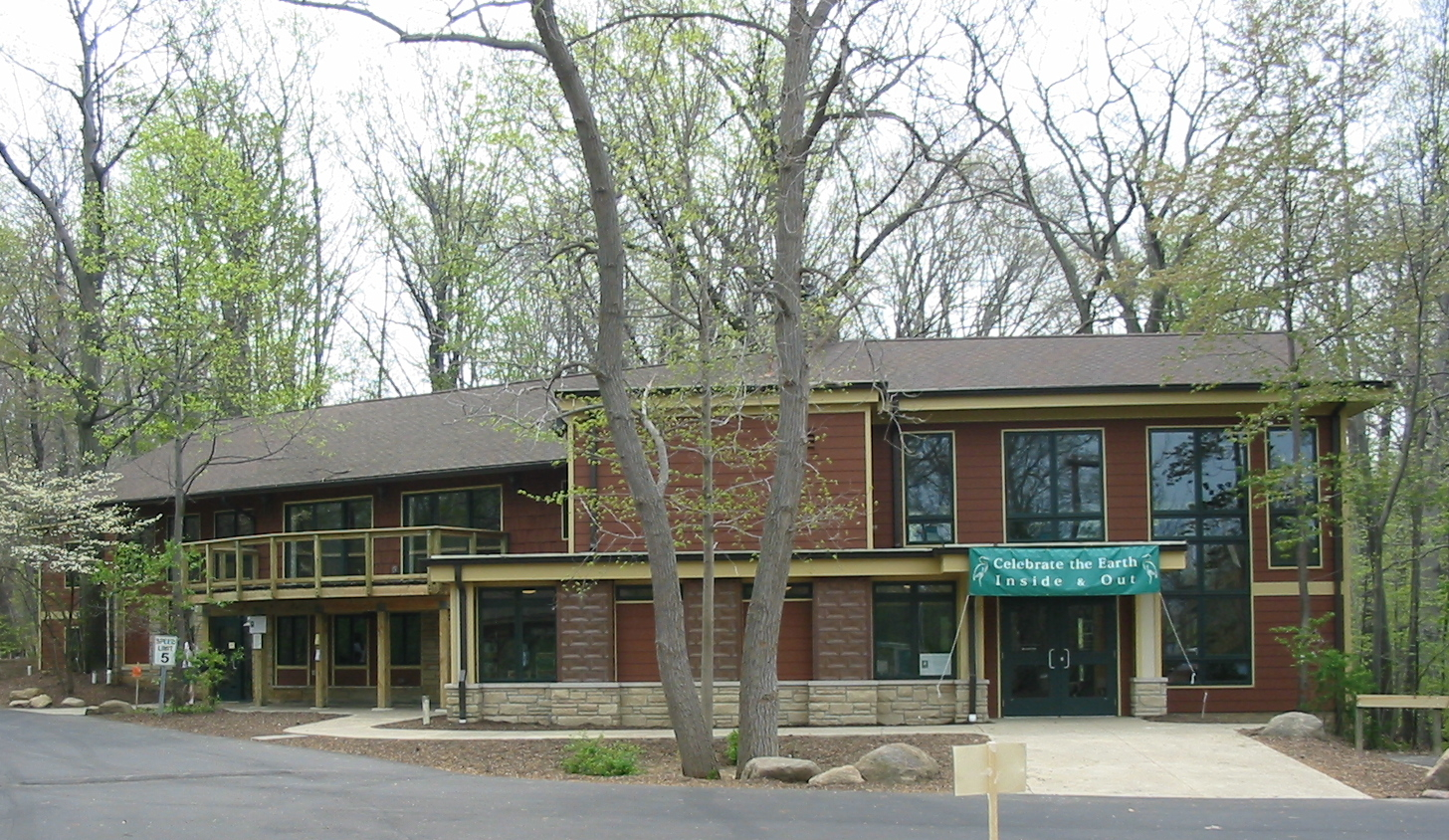
The Nature Center at Shaker Lakes

The Nature Center at Shaker Lakes offers a wide range of opportunities for volunteers ages 13 and up. Environmental stewardship events are held throughout the year to help conserve and preserve the property's 20 acres (8.1 ha) of natural, native species.

== Nature center facilities ==
The Nature Center at Shaker Lakes has indoor and outdoor facilities open to the public and is available for rentals, including birthday parties and weddings. It houses classrooms, a meeting room, exhibit areas, a library, and the Duck Pond, a nature-themed gift store. The Jean Eakin Bird Observation Station, the Murphy Carfagna Wildlife Balcony, and a gallery overlook the grounds. There is also an outdoor pavilion, the All People's Trail, and Stearns Woodland Trail in the woodlands surrounding the Nature Center. The 0.4-mile-long (0.64 km) All People's Trail is a barrier-free, elevated boardwalk, designed to be ADA-accessible for visitors with all physical abilities. A new All People's Trail was constructed in late 2019 and is now open to the public. Features include a whimsical handcrafted Rose Foundation Gazebo and wider boardwalk with wildlife viewing areas for classes and gatherings. The Stearns Woodland Trail is one mile (1.6 km) long and begins at the Nature Center's Wildflower Garden. The trail runs through several wooded, native habitats along the south branch of Cleveland's Doan Brook.

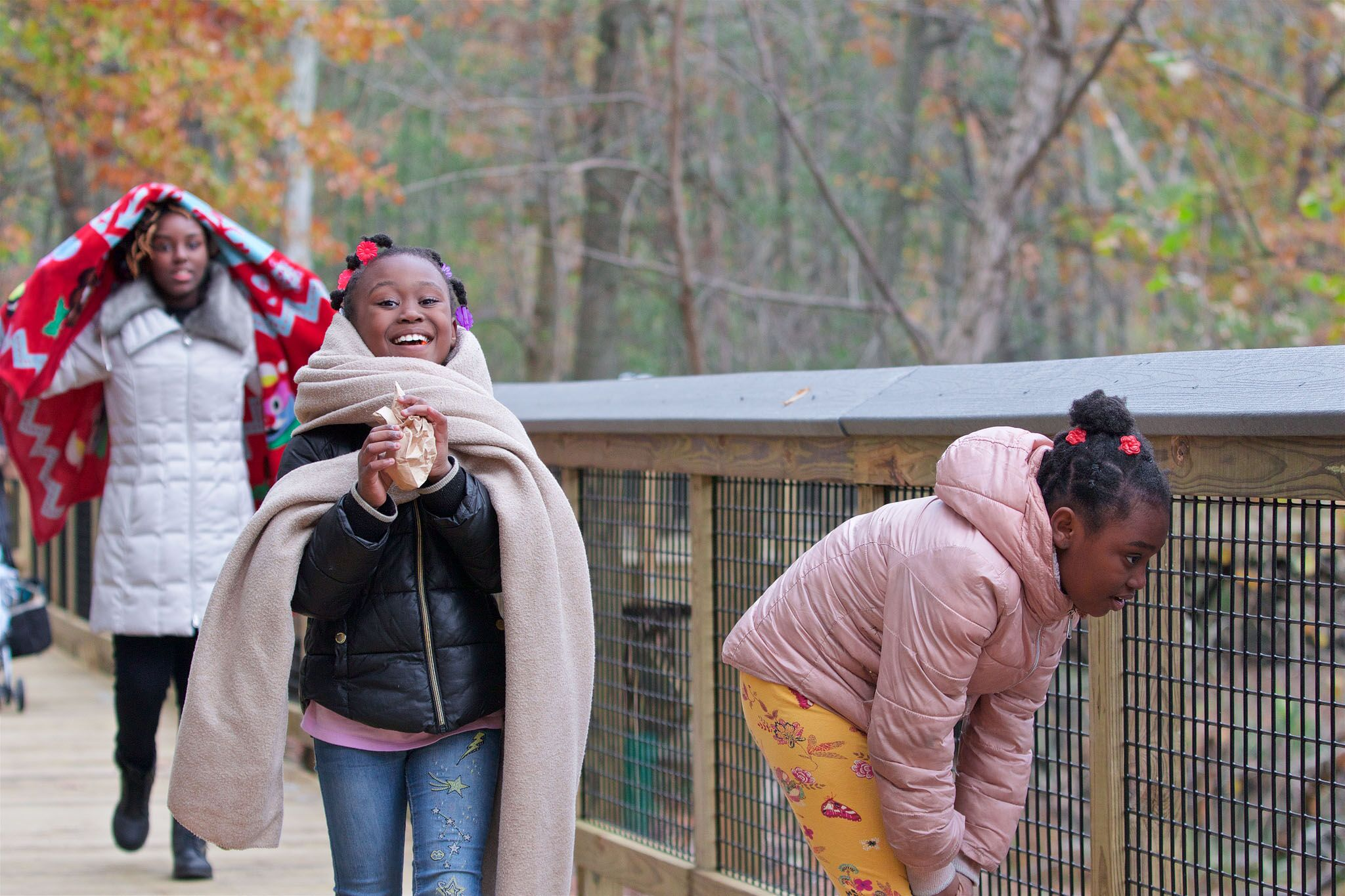
The All People's Trail is ADA accessible and open year-round.

== History ==
The original plan for the Clark Freeway is in light pink.

In 1896, the Shaker Lakes Park was deeded to the Doan Brook Park Commission to become part of the park system which included Ambler, Wade, Rockefeller, and Gordon parks. In 1915, the deed transferred to the city of Cleveland by order of the Supreme Court of Ohio. In 1947, the Shaker Lakes Park was leased to the cities of Shaker Heights and Cleveland Heights for the portions of the park falling within their boundaries. 1964 and 1965 saw the proposal for construction of the Clark and Lee freeways which would provide a more direct route from Downtown Cleveland to Interstate 271. The Clark Freeway would run through the park on either side of the Doan Brook. The intersection of the proposed Clark and Lee freeways would have intersected right where the nature center stands today.

An effort to oppose the freeway was led by the Park Conservation Committee, 35 garden clubs, and six civic organizations. An overall committee, the Committee for Sane Transportation and Environmental Policy (CSTEP) was formed and developed several strategies. These included walks for officials and residents through the parklands, discussions with schools in the surrounding communities about the need for nature education, an effort to get citizens to write letters and protest the construction of the freeway, and the commissioning of an Audubon report about the feasibility of a nature center. The Audubon appraisal concluded that "For the study of conservation and nature in an outdoor laboratory, there is no comparable area to the park within the limits of Greater Cleveland."

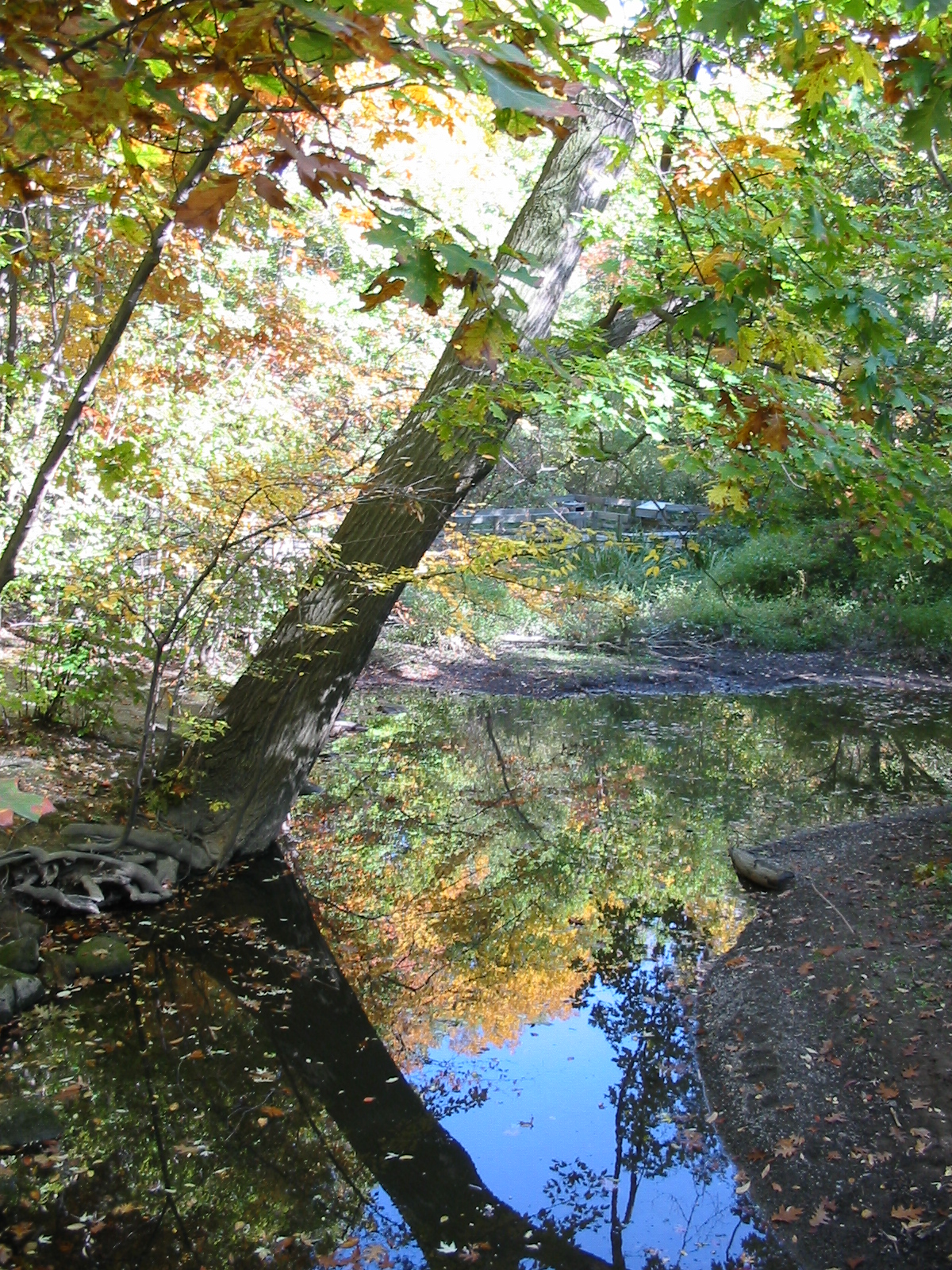
Doan Brook

In mid-1966, recreation programs were held in the lakes area and funding was given to continue with a naturalist for school classes in the fall. On September 15, 1966, the Shaker Lakes Regional Nature Center was formed and incorporated, and fundraising began for the establishment of a building. A lease and permission to build the center was negotiated with the city of Cleveland, while the Park Conservation Committee simultaneously worked toward getting the center designated as a National Environmental Education Landmark. In 1970, a meeting was held at Shaker Heights Middle School with a presentation to Governor James Rhodes about the proposed freeway. Rhodes subsequently directed that the route for the Clark Freeway be withdrawn from the Interstate Highway System.

Maxwell Norcross, an architect in Cleveland from 1923 to 1970 and a member of the Shaker Heights architectural board, designed the nature center. The building was paid for largely through individual contributions and was completed in November 1969. Gary Nelson was hired as the first full-time director in 1971. That same year, the Stearns Memorial Nature Trail and the Wildflower Garden were constructed with contributions from the Shaker Lakes Garden Club. In 1973, the building was remodeled to create additional office and library space. In 1982, the All People's Trail was constructed, followed by the redesign of the Stearns Memorial Trail and the addition of an east wing in 1985. In 2003, the nature center used sustainable building practices to renovate and update its indoor facilities to include upgraded and expanded classrooms, community meeting rooms, nature experience area, bird observation station, and gift shop.

== Designations ==
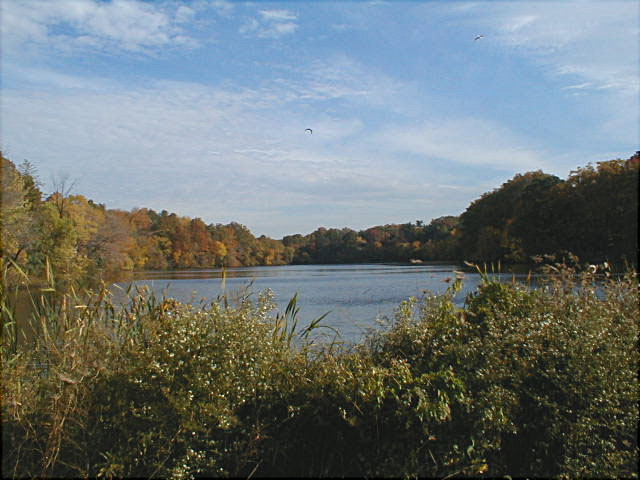
Horseshoe Lake

The nature center was named a National Environmental Education Landmark in 1971 by the National Park Service (NPS) of the United States Department of the Interior, making it one of the first organizations to be recognized as such. It is also designated as a National Environmental Study Area by the NPS for the unique educational opportunities offered by the diverse natural habitats found in its urban setting. In 2003, Audubon designated it as a worldwide Important Bird Area. After renovating and expanding its facilities in 2003 using sustainable building practices, the nature center received the Environmental Protection Agency's 2004 Energy Star Award for Excellence in Energy Efficiency. In 2006, the nature center was certified as an official Wildlife Habitat site by the National Wildlife Federation. The nature center is also listed on the National Register of Historic Places.
