= Twinsburg Public Library =

Coordinates: 41°19′02″N 81°26′55″W

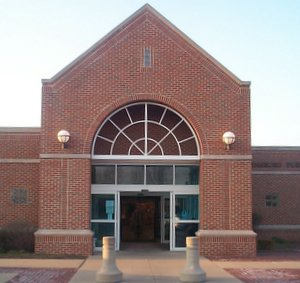
- Location: 10050 Ravenna Road; Twinsburg, Ohio, United States
- Type: Public
- Established: 1910

Access and use
- Circulation: 1,000,000
- Population served: 20,000

Other information
- Website: www.twinsburglibrary.org

The Twinsburg Public Library is located in Twinsburg, a community located northeast Summit County, Ohio, roughly halfway between Akron and Cleveland. It began as the Samuel Bissell Memorial Library in 1910 but its name was changed in 1931 to comply with new laws regarding tax funds. It is currently a school district library associated with the Twinsburg City School District.

In 1993, the library moved to its current location at 10050 Ravenna Road in Twinsburg in order to accommodate its rapidly growing collection and the need for audiovisual and computer rooms. Today the library serves a population of just over 20,000 and surpassed the one million mark in annual circulation in 2006. The library consistently achieves top-10 HAPLR (Hennen's American Public Library Ratings) rankings, and is a member of CLEVNET, a major consortium of public libraries that together provide access to over 11 million items to the Cleveland area and the rest of Ohio.

In 1999 and 2006, Twinsburg Library was voted second and first place (respectively) for libraries of its size in the United States.

== See also ==
- Cleveland Public Library
