= Euclid Public Library =

Coordinates: 41°35′53″N 81°31′32″W

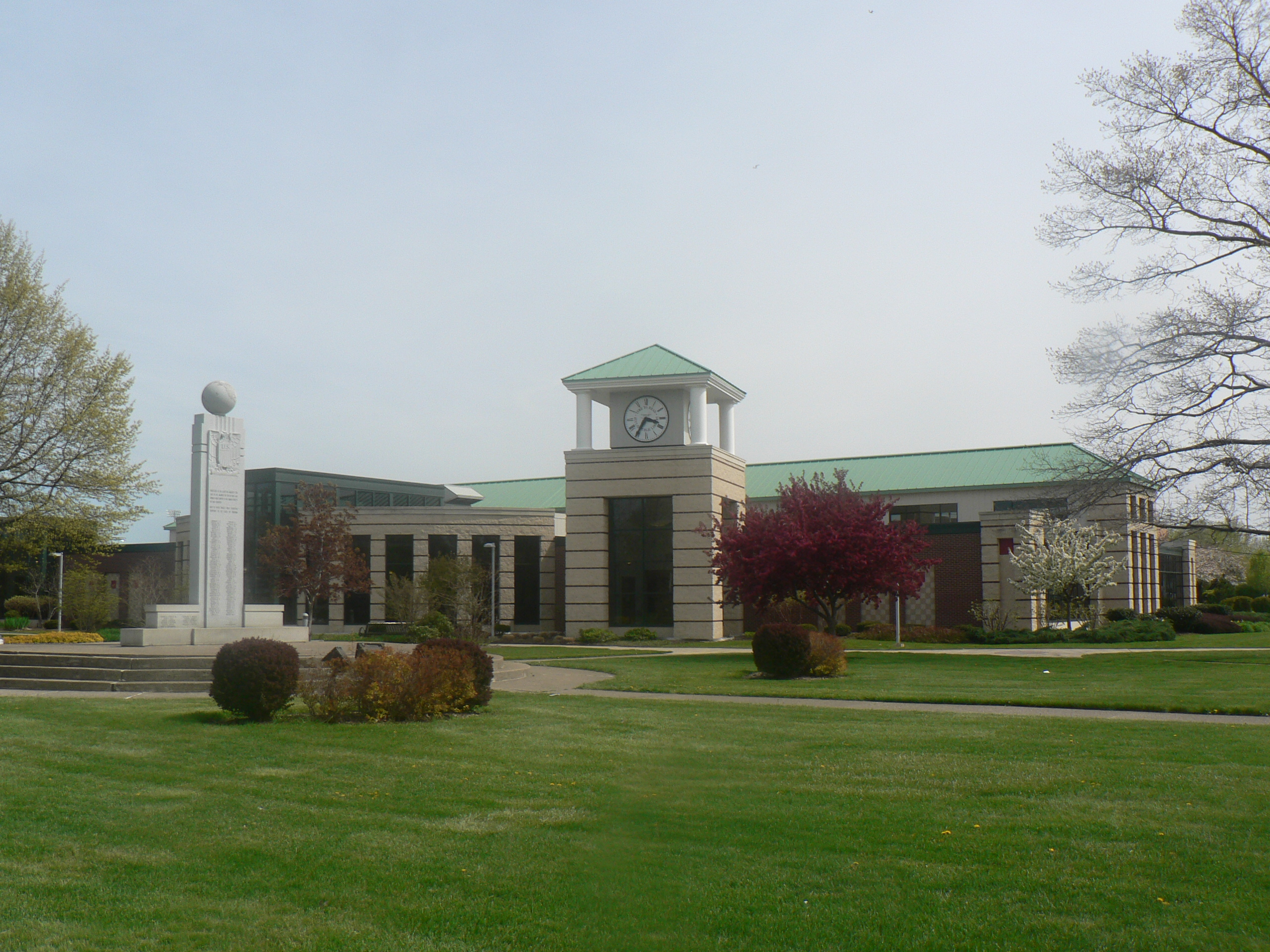
- Location: Euclid, Ohio
- Established: 1935

Access and use
- Population served: 48,000(Euclid)

Other information
- Director: Kacie Armstrong
- Website: www.euclidlibrary.org

The Euclid Public Library is the public library serving Euclid, Ohio. It was originally created in 1935. In 1997 the library was expanded to a 48,000 sq ft (4,500 m^{2}) complex. Since its 1997 expansion the library has consistently ranked highly on the Hennen's American Public Library Ratings (HAPLR) Index.

== History ==
Euclid Public Library was created in 1935 from two branch libraries located in Euclid Central and Shore High Schools. A library Board was appointed. Post war years saw an expansion of Euclid's population, and as each new school was built, EPL established a branch in the school. By 1958 we had 12 branches which pointed out the need for a main library. The library Board was able to save enough money in a building fund to build a library on the present East 222nd Street site at a cost of nearly $300,000. That original building remains part of the library today. Avis Lane was the original library director and served from September 1940 to September 1966.

As Euclid's population grew so did library usage, and by 1964 the need for a larger library was apparent. Expansion funds were approved by Euclid voters, and a new addition that tripled the size of the original building was completed in 1966. In 1985 the building was remodeled and updated once again to make better use of existing space. This enabled the addition of space for small discussion groups, preschool story hours, technological advancements, and accessibility for the disabled.

Euclid Public Library became a CLEVNET member in 1984. In the next ten years library circulation doubled. Audiovisual collections grew from zero to more than 12,000 items. Meeting rooms were filled to capacity. Through a strategic planning process, the community expressed its desire for a technology center, more space for children's and young adult services, a designated area for an African-American collection, better accessibility for the disabled, and more meeting rooms.

In 1995 the residents of Euclid recognized these needs by approving a bond issue for construction of an expanded facility to house these services. That facility is now a reality with 48,000 square feet on the original site.

The library went through a total remodel of the interior to refocus the public space in 2013.

== Library Directors ==
- Avis Lane - September 1940 - May 1966.
- Joseph Bana - May 1966 to December 1985.
- Judith Coleman - January 1986 to March 1989.
- Dan Siebersma - September 1989 to May 1992.
- Donna Perdzock - May 1992 to December 2012.
- Kacie Armstrong - January 2013 to present.

== Services ==
Euclid Public Library offers the following services to patrons:

- Databases, including special collections, ancestry databases, and educational resources for children
- Outreach - home delivery, deposit collections, special formats, and children's services
- Mobile Hotspots
- Passports - applications and renewals
- Computers, Scanning, and Faxing
- Circulation
- City of Euclid online resources
- Library Calendar
- Meeting Rooms
- NicheAcademy
