= Weizer Building (8935 Buckeye Road, Cleveland) =

- U.S. National Register of Historic Places
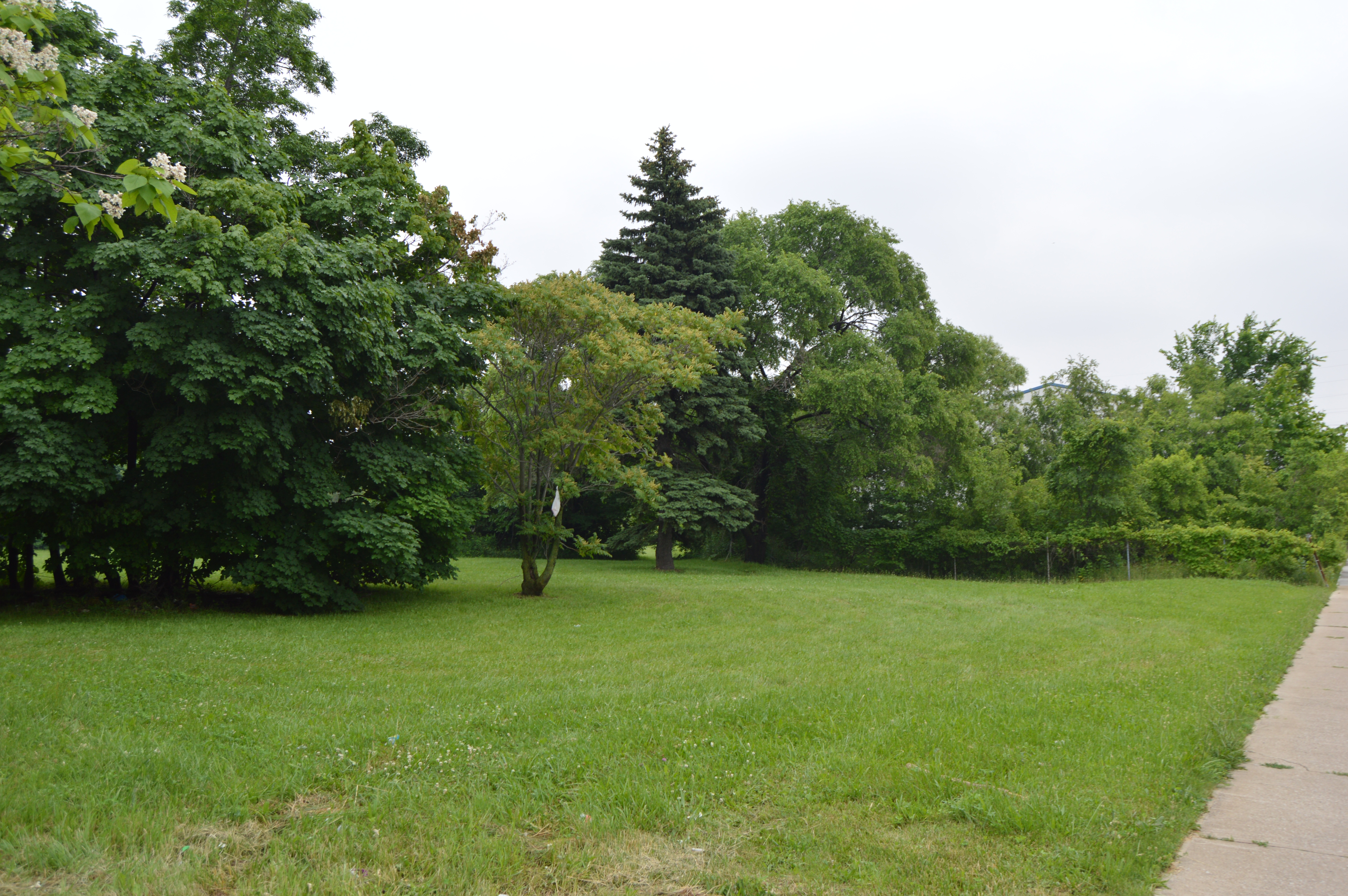
- Site of the building

- Location within Cleveland Location within Ohio Location within the United States
- Location: 8935 Buckeye Rd., Cleveland, Ohio
- Coordinates: 41°29′7″N 81°37′25″W
- Area: Less than 1 acre (0.40 ha)
- Built: 1913
- Architect: Emile Uhlrich
- Architectural style: Late 19th And 20th Century Revivals
- NRHP reference No.: 88000055
- Added to NRHP: February 8, 1988

The Weizer Building was a historic commercial building in the Buckeye-Shaker neighborhood of Cleveland, Ohio, United States. Constructed in 1913 in a heavily Hungarian immigrant community, it was named a historic site in the 1980s, but it is no longer standing.

== History ==
Buckeye Road south of downtown was a primarily Hungarian immigrant community by the end of the nineteenth century, with ethnic ties so strong that strife could still arise with the Slovak immigrant population. Community events centered on St. Elizabeth of Hungary Catholic Church at 90th Street and Buckeye Road, the first Hungarian nationality parish anywhere in the United States.

In such an environment, the Weizer Building was built in 1913. Prominent local architect Emile Uhlrich completed the exquisite design after five years of work. Like St. Elizabeth's, it became a community center for Hungarian cultural activities. However, the ethnic neighborhood no longer exists. Thousands of Buckeye-Shaker residents fought in World War II, and most of them moved to the suburbs after returning from Europe. The trend was exacerbated in the 1960s, as crime grew in the neighborhood, and white flight took many more Hungarians to safer communities; fewer than a thousand native-born Hungarians remained resident in the entire city by the 1990 census.

== Architecture ==
The Weizer Building was a brick and weatherboarded structure with a brick foundation and a tiled roof. Elements of metal and terra cotta were also prominent on the exterior. Three stories tall, the building featured a distinctive three-bay facade composed of brick interspersed with stone quoins, highlighted by the metal and terra cotta elements. Atop the facade, a clock occupied the central spot; it was framed by small towers on either side capping large bay windows, which occupied the second and third stories on the facade's side bays. The lack of bay windows on the first floor produced a prominent overhang on the storefronts. Tile roofs covered the towers in a manner resembling bell towers, while pressed metalwork was used to form numerous small windows immediately under the roofs.

== Historic site ==
In 1988, the Weizer Building was listed on the National Register of Historic Places, qualifying both because of its architecture and its critical place in the history of the neighborhood. Fourteen years later, the same designation was granted to another Weizer Building farther east on Buckeye Road. Despite the designation, the Weizer Building had been destroyed by 2007, and grass and trees now cover the lot.
