= Shaker Village Historic District (Shaker Heights, Ohio) =

Historic district in Ohio, United States

- U.S. National Register of Historic Places
- U.S. Historic district
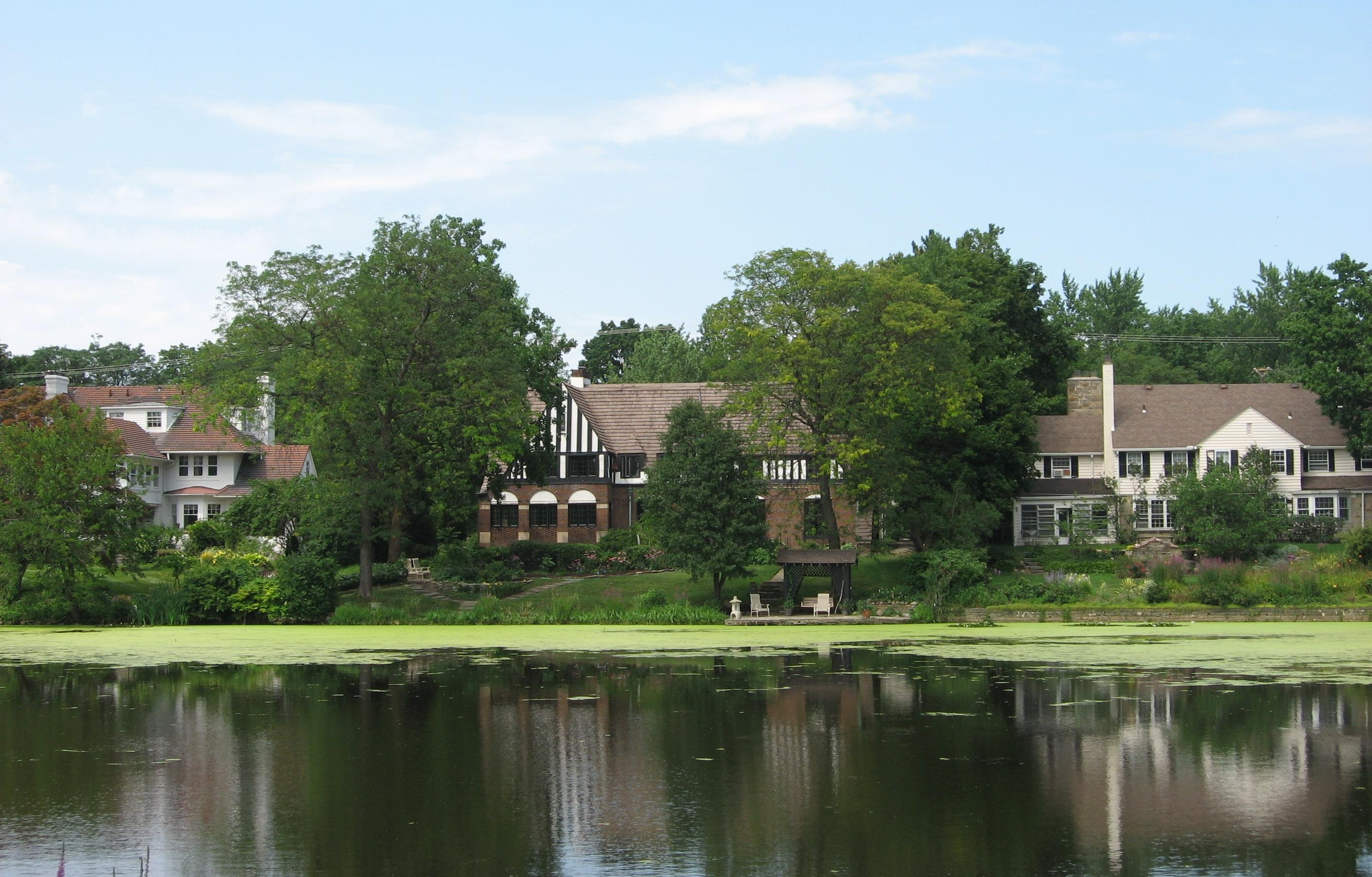
- Houses in the district

- Location within Cleveland Location within Ohio Location within the United States
- Location: Roughly bounded by Fairmount and Lomond Blvds., Green, Warrensville Center, Becket, and Coventry Rds., Shaker Heights, Ohio
- Coordinates: 41°28′33″N 81°33′11″W
- Area: 2,500 acres (1,000 ha)
- Built: 1905
- Architect: Multiple
- Architectural style: Late 19th And 20th Century Revivals
- NRHP reference No.: 84003650
- Added to NRHP: May 31, 1984

Shaker Village Historic District is a historic district between Fairmount and Lomond Boulevards, and Green, Warrensville Center, Becket, and Coventry Roads in Shaker Heights, Ohio. The district comprises roughly seventy percent of the city of Shaker Heights.

The district was largely constructed between the late nineteenth century and early twentieth century. The area was once home to a large Shaker population. The district was added to the National Register of Historic Places in 1984.

== See also ==
- Shakertown
