= St. Elizabeth of Hungary Shrine (Cleveland) =

Historic church in Ohio, United States

- St. Elizabeth of Hungary
- U.S. National Register of Historic Places
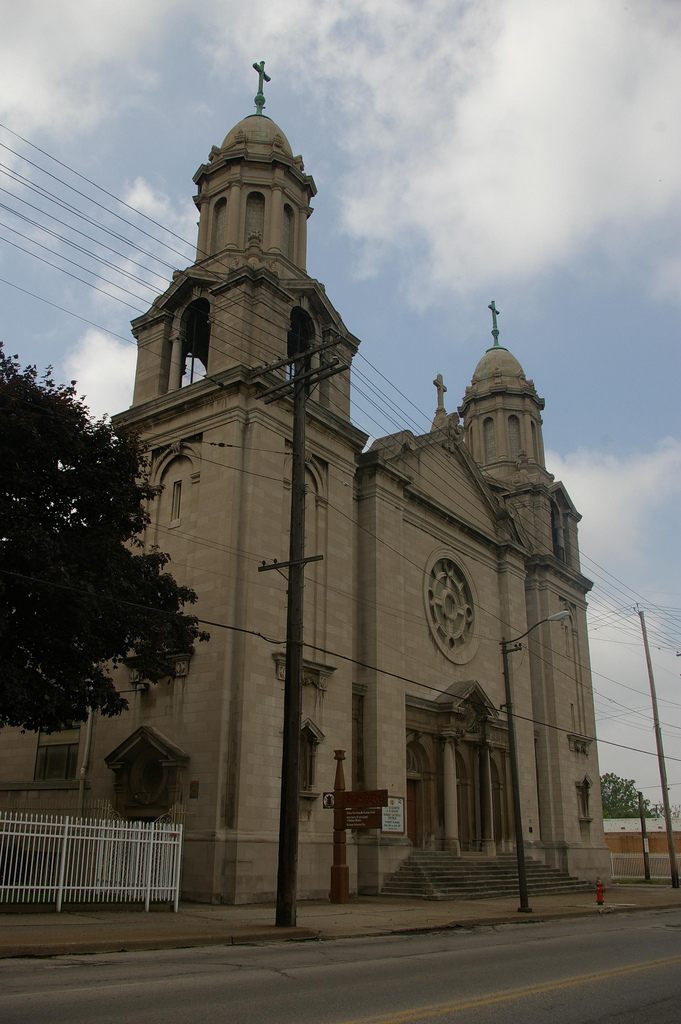
- Front, seen from east

- Location within Cleveland Location within Ohio Location within the United States
- Location: 9016 Buckeye Rd., Cleveland, Ohio
- Coordinates: 41°29′7″N 81°37′24″W
- Area: Less than 1 acre (0.40 ha)
- Built: 1918
- Architect: Emile M. Uhlrich
- Architectural style: Italian Baroque
- NRHP reference No.: 76001402
- Added to NRHP: January 30, 1976

St. Elizabeth of Hungary Shrine
- St. Elizabeth of Hungary Shrine

Administration
- Diocese: Diocese of Cleveland

Clergy
- Bishop: Edward C. Malesic

St. Elizabeth of Hungary is a historic Catholic Church in the Buckeye Road neighborhood on the east side of Cleveland, Ohio, United States. The earliest ethnic parish established for Hungarians in the United States, its present building was constructed in the early twentieth century, and it has been named a historic site. In 2023, it was declared a shrine church by Bishop Edward Malesic for the promotion of the Christian heritage of the Hungarian people as well divine worship according to the liturgical books in use prior to the reforms of Pope Paul VI, and is presently operated by canons of the Institute of Christ the King Sovereign Priest. In 2026 the Apostolate at St. Elizabeth was transferred to the newly established Immaculate Conception Oratory.

== Parish history ==
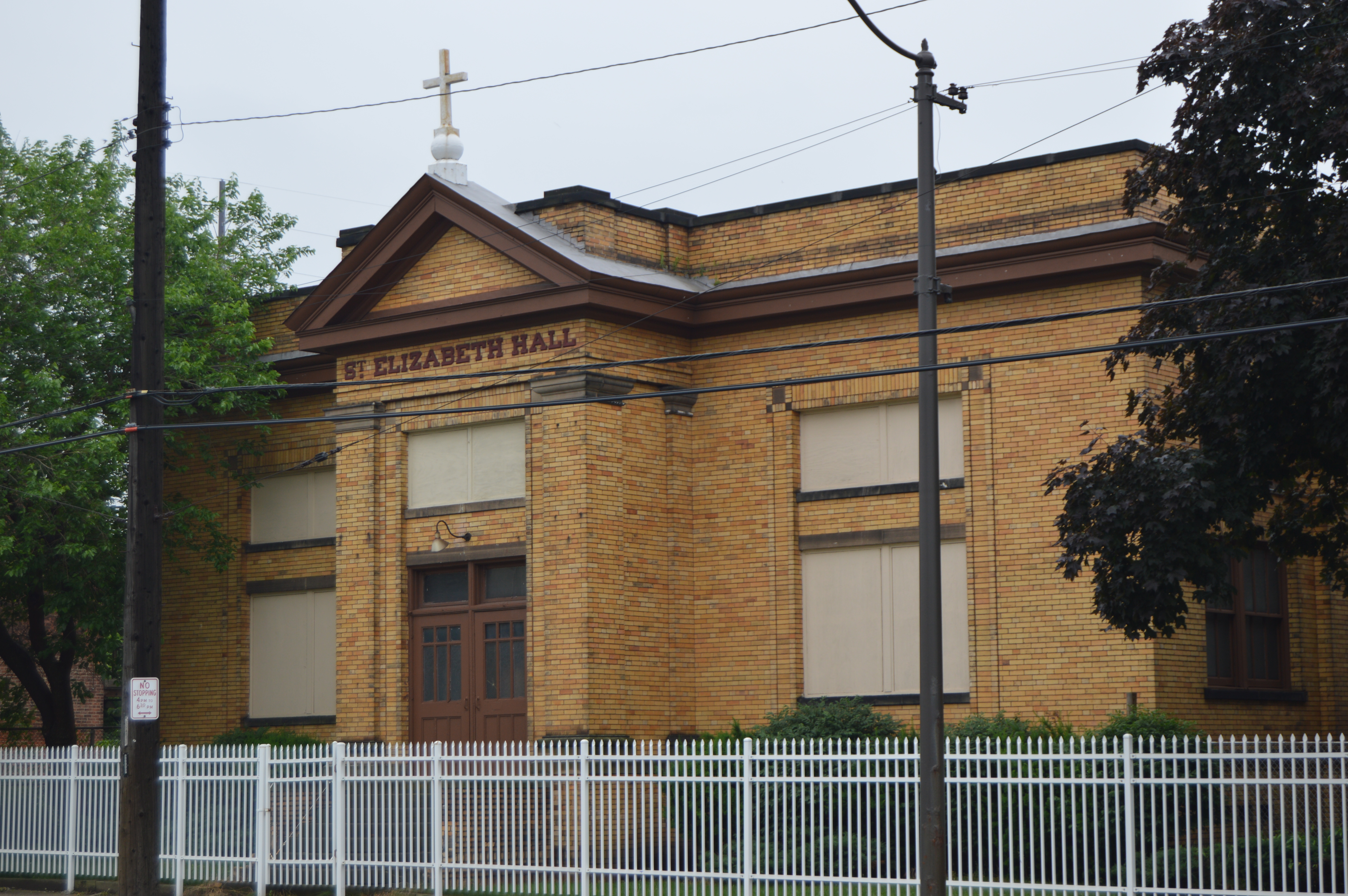
Parish hall

Cleveland's first Hungarian Catholics initially worshipped at St. Ladislaus' Church, an east-side Slovakian parish, but ethnic strife and increasing immigration prompted the Hungarian community to seek their own parish. Bishop Horstmann interceded on their behalf with papal authorities, and Charles Boehm of Hungary settled in Cleveland in late 1892 to serve the new St. Elizabeth parish, the first Hungarian nationality parish in America. Boehm immediately began registering members and advocating for the construction of a church complex; the first church building, a brick structure, was erected by the end of 1893, a school soon followed, and a larger school was completed in 1900 because of expanded enrollment. He also began a Hungarian-language parish newspaper that soon gained subscribers in other parts of the United States and in Hungary. Julius Szepessy took Boehm's place in 1907 after the latter left to begin missions among Hungarians in America, but after Szepessy died in 1923, Boehm returned and remained until retiring in 1927.

The parish was weakened in 1904 as Hungarian Catholics living in western Cleveland began to weary of their three-hour round trip for Mass. With Boehm's support, the new St. Emeric's Church was created for them; it was the first of more than a dozen Hungarian parishes established directly or indirectly through his influence. Nevertheless, Boehm's remaining parishioners were numerous enough that the old building was insufficient for their needs, and by the time of his departure in 1907, he had begun to raise money for the erection of a replacement. Before his death, Szepessy saw the completion of the present structure, along with a parish hall that became a community center for the neighborhood's Hungarians.

In July 2023, Bishop Edward Malesic designated St. Elizabeth's as a shrine church for the continued use of the Tridentine Mass. Subsequent to the initial announcement, Malesic extended an invitation to the Institute of Christ the King Sovereign Priest to commence operation of the church for the exclusive celebration of the traditional Mass and other sacraments in the forms practiced prior to the reforms of Pope Paul VI. Canon James Hoogerwerf of the ICKSP was named rector of St. Elizabeth's. The first Mass celebrated under the auspices of the Institute was conducted on September 24, 2023. As of June 1, 2026 the ICKSP has transferred its Cleveland apostolate from St Elizabeth to the newly established Oratory of Immaculate Conception.

== Architecture ==
St. Elizabeth's first building with a basic Gothic Revival structure of brick, completed in 1893 and removed in 1917 for the construction of the present building. Although the cornerstone was laid in 1918, the construction process was lengthy, and it was finally completed only in 1922. Built primarily of limestone, according to a design of Cleveland architect Emile Uhlrich, the church is an example of Italian-influenced Baroque Revival architecture, partly modelled after the church of Sant'Agnese in Agone in Rome. Two great towers, topped with cupolas, form the ends of the facade, while a great rose sits in the middle section of the facade high above the main entrance. A flight of steps rises from the sidewalk to the central main entrance, which sits along the sidewalk with no setback.

== Preservation ==
In 1976, St. Elizabeth's Church was listed on the National Register of Historic Places, qualifying both because of its place in the area's history and because of its historically significant architecture. The building has been well maintained, due partially to funds from generous bequests, but membership has fallen significantly from the parish's height. Most of the neighborhood's Hungarian residents left in the 1970s, due largely to disappearing factory jobs and rapidly rising crime rates. However, comparable weakening at the west side daughter parish, St. Emeric's, and another Hungarian parish in Orange, St. Margaret's, prompted Bishop Lennon to close those two parishes in early 2009 and urge their members to begin worshipping at St. Elizabeth's.
