= Shaker Heights City School District =

School district in Ohio, United States

Address
- 15600 Parkland Drive Shaker Heights, Ohio, 44120; United States
- Coordinates: 41°28′35″N 81°33′6″W

District information
- Type: Public
- Grades: PreK–12
- Established: 1910; 116 years ago
- Schools: 8
- NCES District ID: 3904475

Students and staff
- Students: 4,400 (2024–2025)
- Teachers: 296.04 (on an FTE basis) (2024–2025)
- Staff: 642.71 (on an FTE basis) (2024–2025)
- Student–teacher ratio: 14.86 (2024–2025)

Other information
- Website: www.shaker.org

The Shaker Heights City School District is a school district headquartered in Shaker Heights, Ohio, United States, in Greater Cleveland. The system serves all residents of the city of Shaker Heights and about 1 square mile (2.6 km^{2}) of the City of Cleveland around Shaker Square. The Cleveland portion has been a part of the school district since the 1920s. The residents of the Cleveland portion may vote in school board elections and use the school facilities and they pay the same school taxes that residents in the Shaker Heights portion pay.

== History ==
Shaker Heights began operating its own school system in 1910. Boulevard Elementary (1914) is the oldest building in the district; Shaker Heights Middle School (1957) (formerly known as Byron Junior High School) is the newest. The schools were designed to complement the natural and architectural beauty of Shaker Heights. Facilities include eight school buildings, mainly of Georgian design; computer labs in all schools; a planetarium; two indoor pools; playgrounds; and athletic fields. The average age of buildings currently in use is 73 years. The system is funded in large part by property tax millage levies approved by residents based upon home valuation.

Shaker Heights is considered a progressive school system in its approach to education and social balance. Shaker was among the first school systems in the United States to actively pursue school desegregation in the early 1960s by neighbors of Ludlow Elementary School. The success of that initial attempt by residents led to voluntary busing between schools in the system in order to achieve better racial balance. As a result of these efforts, Shaker schools avoided the court ordered busing programs of the 1970s.

== Schools ==
At its peak enrollment in the late 1960s the system operated nine elementary schools, two junior high schools and a high school. Population and demographic shifts, along with the evolution of academic theory, have reduced the number of elementary schools from nine (grades K-6) to five (grades K-4): Fernway, Onaway, Lomond, Boulevard, and Mercer. Woodbury Elementary School (originally Shaker High School and later Woodbury Junior High School) serves as a district-wide collector school for grades 5 and 6. Shaker Middle School serves all students in grades 7 and 8. Shaker Heights High School houses grades 9 through 12. The Shaker Heights High School mascot is a “Raider”. School colors are red and white. The district employs 430 teachers for a student / teacher ratio of 13:1 (average Ohio ratio 16:1). 78% of Shaker teachers hold master's degrees; 5% of teachers hold a doctorate or a PhD.

== Academic program ==
Shaker Heights was one of eight public school districts in the nation designated as an International Baccalaureate (IB) district. It was the first public school district in Cuyahoga County to adopt the International Baccalaureate Diploma program. The high school began offering IB courses in 2010, and the first class of International Baccalaureate Diploma candidates graduated in 2012. The district estimates that roughly 90% of Shaker graduates attend college.
