= CLEVNET =

American library consortium

- Formation: December 1, 1982
- Purpose: provides access to a shared catalog, databases, and other technology services to libraries in the resource-sharing network
- Headquarters: 325 Superior Ave N.E., Cleveland, Ohio 44114
- Region served: Northeast Ohio
- Director: Jamie L. Mason
- Website: CLEVNET

CLEVNET is a library consortium headquartered at Cleveland Public Library. It was founded in 1982 and includes over 40 public library systems in northeast Ohio. CLEVNET provides access to more than 12 million titles of books, movies, music and e-books. CLEVNET was also the headquarters for Ohio's virtual reference service, KnowItNow24x7, from 2001 to its closing in 2015.

== History ==
The origins of CLEVNET date to the automation of Cleveland Public Library's card catalog in the late 1970s and early 1980s under Director Ervin Gaines in partnership with Data Research Associates (DRA). In an effort to share the capabilities of the online catalog with other libraries, Director Gaines invited other area libraries to connect to the new technology. The Cleveland Heights - University Heights Libraries were the first library system to express interest. In December 1981, an agreement between the two library systems was approved, and the Cleveland Heights - University Heights Libraries came online on December 1, 1982, officially launching the CLEVNET consortium.

The original online catalog system ran from its inception in 1979 until a brief "shutdown" in 1990 for upgrades. The scope of the upgrade was outlined with additional details by a Letter To The Editor from Robert T. Carterette: "Clevnet is one of the largest library resource-sharing networks in the United States today, making 1.6 million titles available to public libraries throughout Northern Ohio... in addition to 4.2 million items owned by the Clevnet libraries, 1.6 million title records, 106,000 book order records, and 32,500 Union List of Periodical records must be processed, a total of 5.9 million. The system processes the 3.6 gigabytes of data."

In 2003, Cleveland Public Library, which administered CLEVNET, chose Sirsi as its new source for public library technology products and services.

In 2009, CLEVNET member libraries, including Cleveland Public Library, were the first public libraries to offer e-books to download in the EPUB format.

In 2016, CLEVNET made the decision to move its servers from Cleveland Public Library to the State of Ohio Computer Center (SOCC) in Columbus, Ohio.

In May 2017, Rocky River Public Library joined CLEVNET. In September 2018, Morley Library joined the consortium.

CLEVNET is mentioned on page 105 in the 2017 fiction work The Unclaimed Victim by D. M. Pulley, a Cleveland author.

== Participating libraries ==
The following are the current members of the CLEVNET consortium and their date of entry into the network.

1. Cleveland Public Library 1982
2. Cleveland Heights-University Heights Public Library 1982
3. Shaker Heights Public Library 1983
4. Willoughby-Eastlake Public Library 1983
5. Elyria Public Library 1984
6. Euclid Public Library 1984
7. Ritter Public Library 1984
8. Sandusky Public Library 1984
9. East Cleveland Public Library 1985
10. Hudson Library & Historical Society 1985
11. Medina County District Library 1985
12. Cleveland Law Library (not a public library) 1985
13. Orrville Public Library 1985
14. Twinsburg Public Library 1985
15. Wayne County Public Library 1985
16. Lorain Public Library System 1990
17. Perry Public Library 1992
18. Madison (Ohio) Public Library 1993
19. Wickliffe Public Library 1995
20. Bellevue Public Library 1996
21. Clyde Public Library 1997
22. Fairport Harbor Public Library 1997
23. Kirtland Public Library 1997
24. Birchard Public Library 1999
25. Milan-Berlin Public Library 2000
26. Huron Public Library 2001
27. Kingsville Public Library 2013
28. Peninsula Public Library 2002
29. Burton Public Library 2005
30. Barberton Public Library 2009
31. Bristol Public Library 2011
32. Hubbard Public Library 2011
33. Girard Free Library 2011
34. Kinsman Public Library 2011
35. McKinley Memorial Library 2011
36. Newton Falls Public Library 2011
37. Norwalk Public Library 2012
38. Andover Public Library 2013
39. Conneaut Public Library 2013
40. Harbor-Topky Public Library 2013
41. Henderson Memorial Public Library 2013
42. Rock Creek Public Library 2013
43. Geauga County Public Library 2017
44. Rocky River Public Library 2017
45. Morley Library 2018
46. Mentor Public Library 2019
47. Stow-Munroe Falls Public Library 2021
