= North Union Shaker Site =

- U.S. National Register of Historic Places
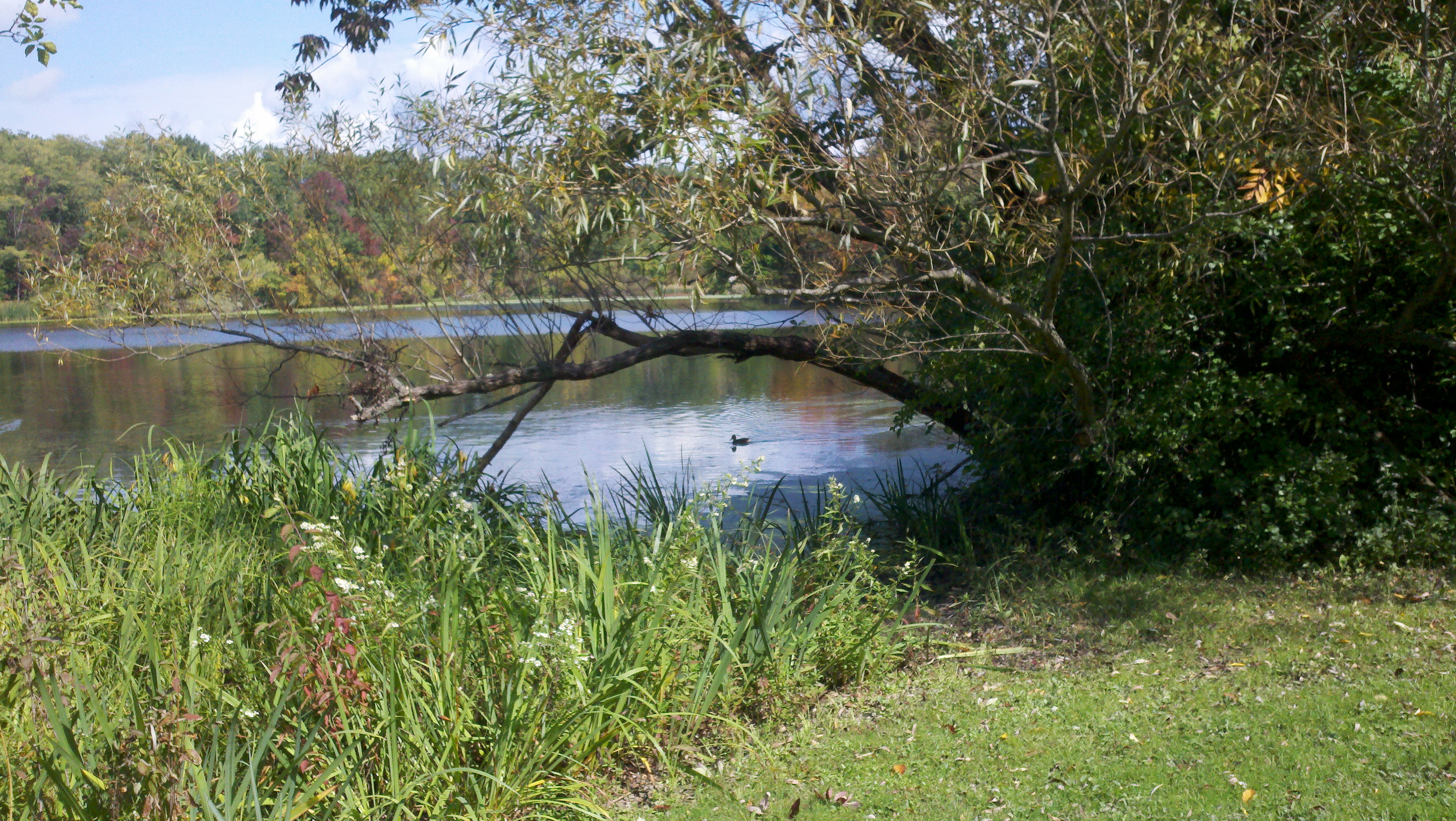
- Horseshoe Lake at North Union Shaker Historic Site
- Nearest city: Shaker Heights, Ohio
- Area: 146 acres (59 ha)
- Built: 1822
- NRHP reference No.: 74001446
- Added to NRHP: August 13, 1974

North Union Shaker Site is a historic site in Shaker Heights, Ohio. The site was founded by Shakers in 1822 and was added to the National Register of Historic Places in 1974. The Shakers ran grist and grain mills from the lakes created when they dammed Doan Creek. The community ceased to exist in 1899. All of the buildings that had been part of the North Union Shaker community have been demolished, and 280 of the original 1,000 acres are Shaker Lakes parkland, which includes walking trails and a Shaker archaeological site, the Shaker Historical Museum and Library.

== Shaker community ==
Ralph Russell convinced his family to convert to the Shaker sect and established the North Union Shaker Settlement in 1822 with just over 80 individuals on 1,000 acres of donated land.

In 1826, the group dammed Doan Brook, thus creating the Lower Lake and establishing a gristmill and a sawmill. Later, in 1854, the community built a second dam creating the Upper Lake, and constructed another mill. Also called 'The Valley of God's Pleasure', the colony peaked around 1850 with about 300 settlers. The Mill family was established about 1826 to run the mills, which produced lumber and milled grain. The Gathering Family was established in the community.

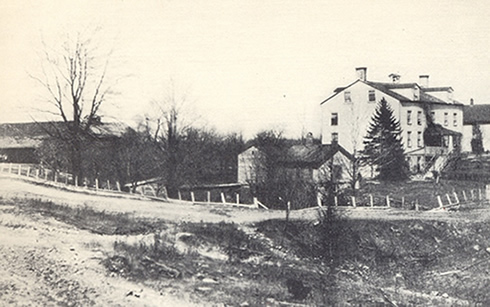
Mill Family House, North Union Settlement

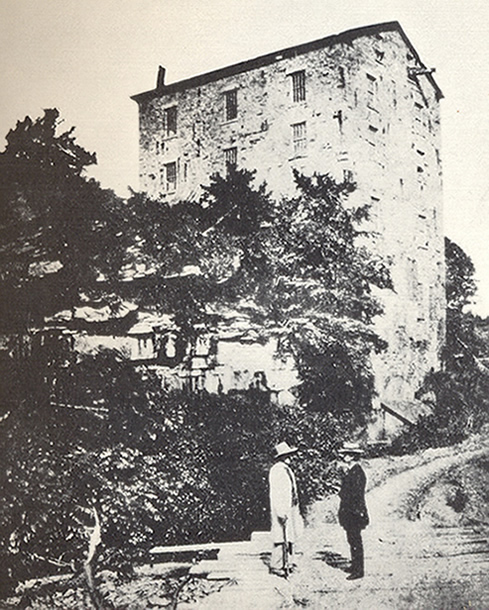
Old Stone Grist Mill, North Union Shaker Settlement

As the Shakers practiced celibacy, the colony faded away and was closed in 1889. In 1905, the land was bought by brothers M.J. and O.P. Van Sweringen who envisioned the first garden styled suburb in Ohio for the site. The brothers constructed homes, set aside land for churches and schools, and planted trees.

There were approximately 200 Shaker songs, hymns and anthems composed at North Union. One of them was written in tribute to the Shaker leader, Ann Lee, on her arrival in New York City in 1774. It is titled, "On the Landing of Mother Ann in America."

None of the buildings from the North Union Shaker community remain.

Today, only one "society" remains in the control of the last Shakers, located at Sabbathday Lake Shaker Village in New Gloucester, Maine.

== Park and Shaker Historical Museum ==
Land that had been owned by the Shakers and was donated to the City of Cleveland is the basis for the Shaker Lakes Parklands. The park includes lakes created by the Shakers, walking trails, and an archaeological site where the Shakers' houses had been demolished.
