= Buckeye–Shaker =

- Neighborhood of Cleveland
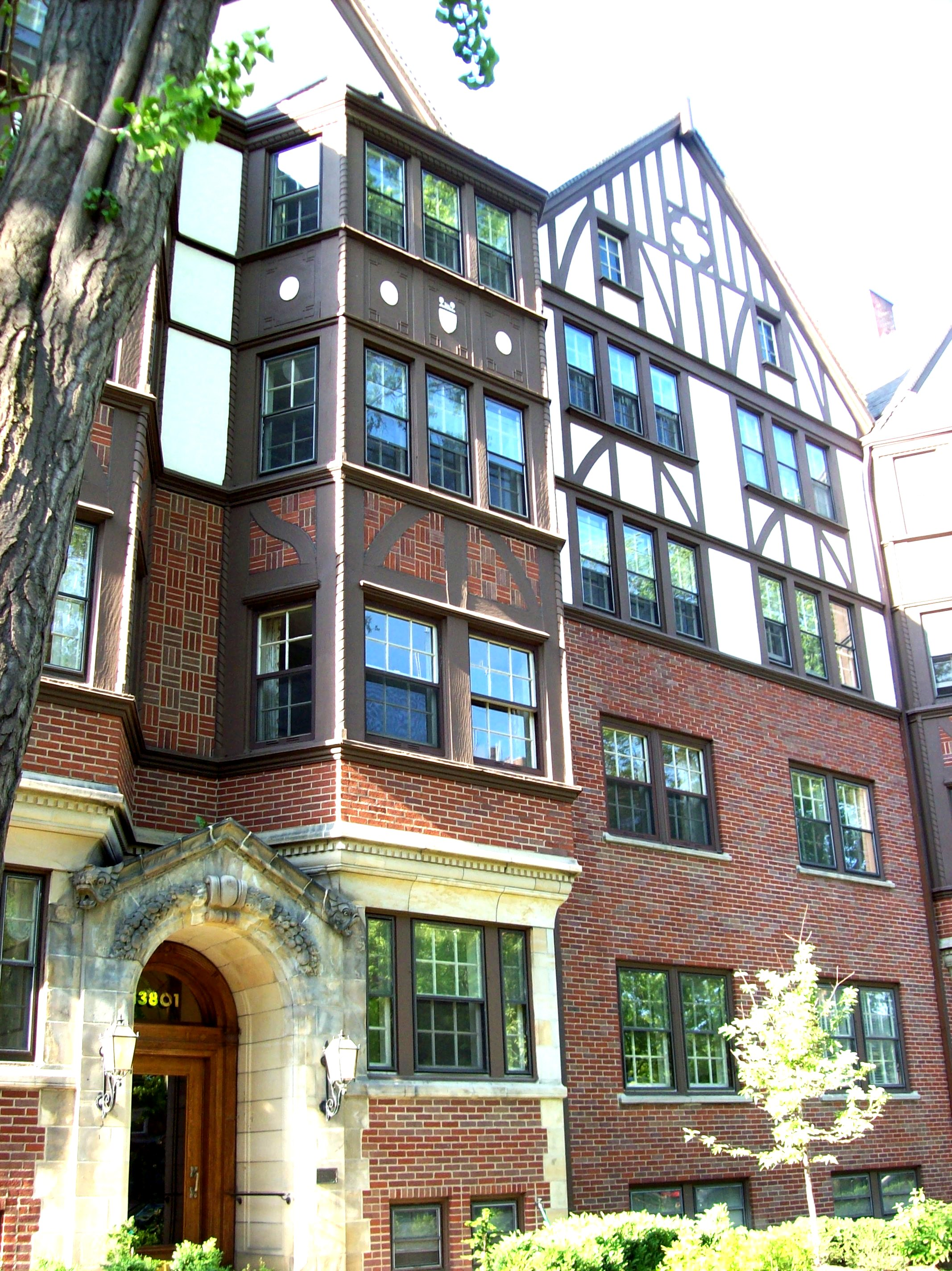

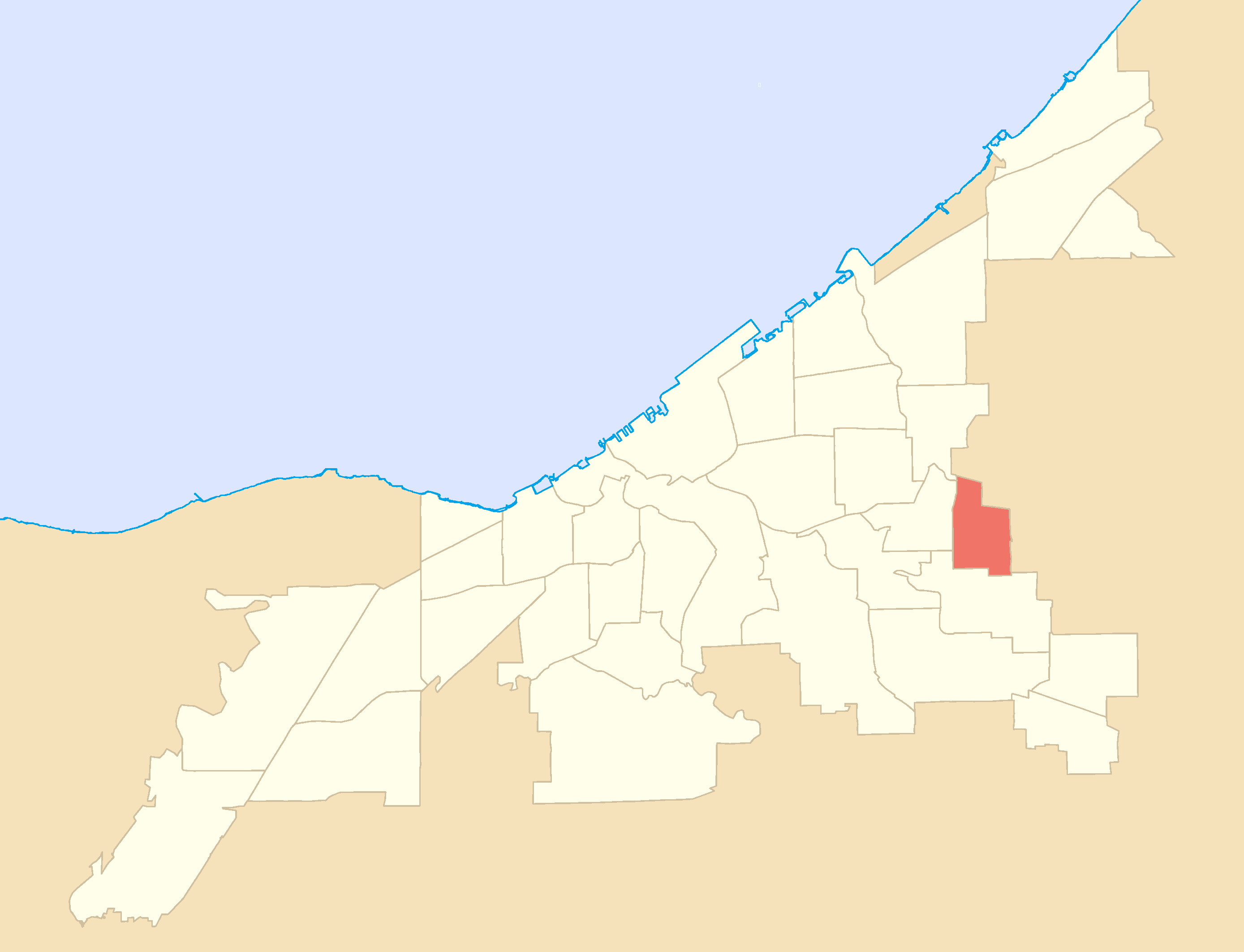
- Coordinates: 41°29′2″N 81°35′26″W
- Country: United States
- State: Ohio
- County: Cuyahoga County
- City: Cleveland

Population (2020)
  - Total: 11,680

Demographics
  - White: 14.9%
  - Black: 78.5%
  - Hispanic (of any race): 1.6%
  - Asian and Pacific Islander: 4.9%
  - Mixed and Other: 1.7%
- Time zone: UTC-5 (EST)
  - Summer (DST): UTC-4 (EDT)
- ZIP Codes: 44120
- Area code: 216
- Median income: $30,448
- Source: 2020 U.S. Census, City Planning Commission of Cleveland

- Shaker Square Historic District
- U.S. National Register of Historic Places
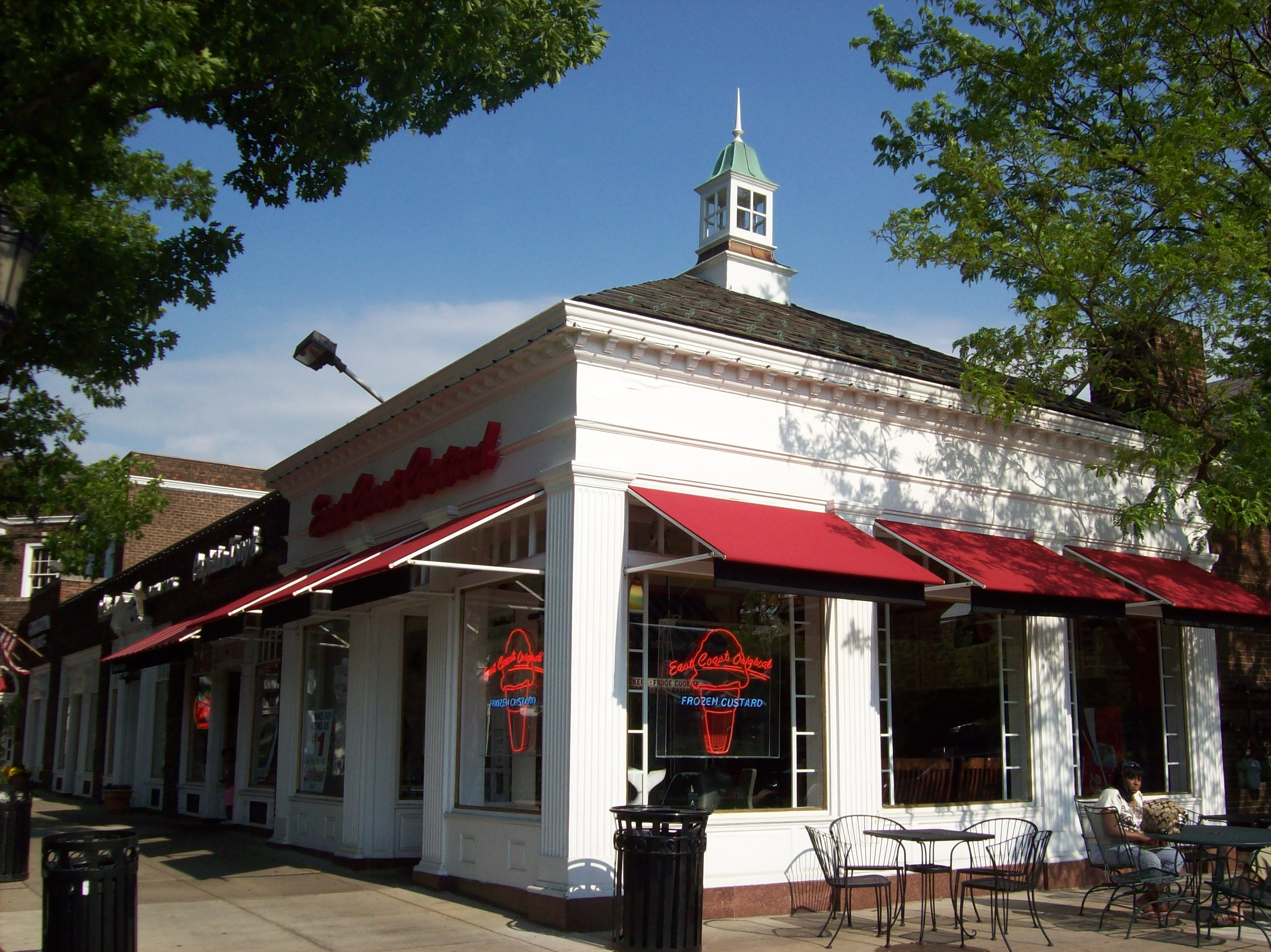
- Shops on the southeast corner of Shaker Square

- Location within Cleveland Location within Ohio Location within the United States
- Location: Shaker and Moreland Blvds. Cleveland, Ohio
- Coordinates: 41°29′2″N 81°35′26″W
- Built: 1927–1929
- Architectural style: Colonial Revival
- NRHP reference No.: 83004367
- Added to NRHP: 1983

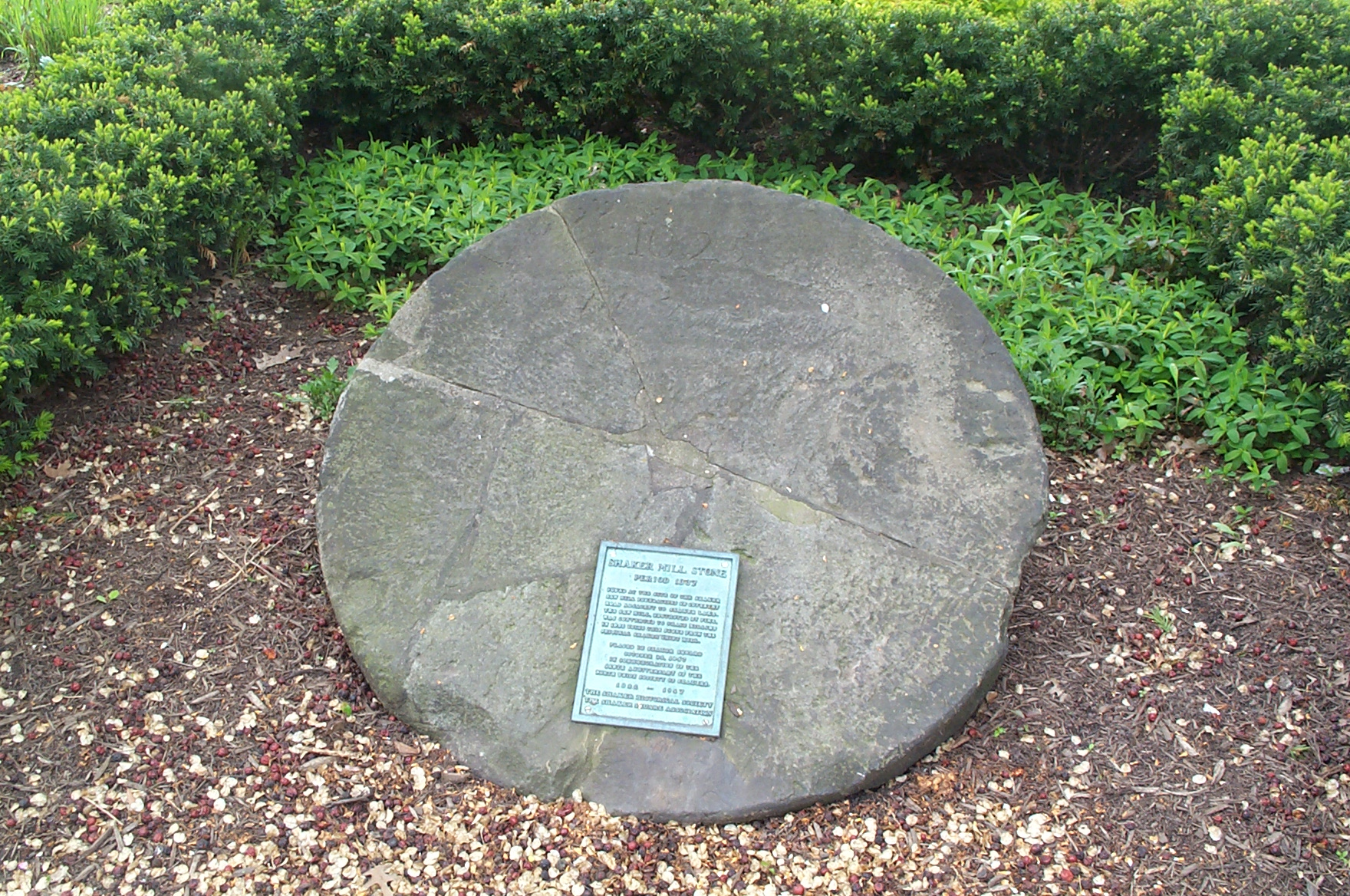
The Shaker Mill Stone, which lies in Shaker Square

Buckeye–Shaker is a neighborhood on the East Side of Cleveland, Ohio. It encompasses two sub neighborhoods: in its south and west, the old Buckeye neighborhood; and in its northeast, the Shaker Square neighborhood, which is centered on a historic shopping district and an eponymous rapid transit station, located at the intersection of Shaker and Moreland Boulevards, on the light rail line that connects the city of Shaker Heights to downtown Cleveland. From the early to mid-20th century, the Buckeye Road neighborhood was known as "Little Hungary", serving as the historic heart of Cleveland's Hungarian community, which at one time was the largest in the world outside of Hungary and for years has been almost completely African American. Shaker Square, continues to be known as one of Cleveland's most notable neighborhoods, in terms of shopping, dining, architecture, the education of its residents, participation in civic life, diversity, and quality of living.

Buckeye–Shaker is bordered by the neighborhoods of Woodland Hills on its west, Mount Pleasant to the south, University Circle to the north, and the suburb of Shaker Heights to the east.

== Shaker Square ==
The historic American Colonial-Georgian shopping center, which was largely influenced by European town squares, was built between 1927 and 1929 by the Van Sweringen brothers. Several pieces were added to the four quadrants, likely in the 1950s. Nearby, along Van Aken Boulevard but essentially an appendage to the Square, a commercial strip was built in 1939. The two brothers, who also developed much of the land to the east of the neighborhood as the planned community of Shaker Heights, envisioned Shaker Square as its gateway between the urban and suburban living spaces represented in the early 20th century. On either side of the train tracks are two lawn areas. A short distance east of the Shaker Square stop, the track splits into the Green Line (that heads east to Green Road), and the Blue Line (that runs southeast on Van Aken Boulevard, until it reaches Chagrin Boulevard).

Four large buildings around the perimeter of the grass lawns make up the second planned shopping center in the United States, after Country Club Plaza in Kansas City. They were designed in a Neo-Georgian style by Phillip Small and Charles Bacon Rowley, and together form an octagonal area that is said to have been inspired by the eight-sided plaza at the center of the Amalienborg Palace in Copenhagen, Denmark. Since 2004, the Square has been owned by The Coral Company, whose offices are in Shaker Square.

Today, Shaker Square is the heart of the neighborhood. Near the square are more than 4,000 units of rental and condominium apartments (the largest concentration of multi-family housing in Cleveland), townhouses, and many private homes.

=== Larchmere ===
The Larchmere district begins at North Moreland Boulevard, stretching west along Larchmere Boulevard to East 121st Street. The commercial and residential district is known for its dozens of storefronts and annual festivals, including PorchFest, Holiday Stroll, and Larchmere Festival.

== Buckeye Road ==
The Buckeye Road neighborhood was known as Little Hungary and developed as the heart of Cleveland's Hungarian community in the late 19th century. By the 1920 United States census, over 42,000 residents in Cleveland listed themselves as having been born in the Kingdom of Hungary, with a large portion of these residing in the Buckeye Road neighborhood. Like many immigrant groups, the Hungarians came to the United States looking for a better life, and those who settled in Cleveland came at a time when the city was one of the nation's leading industrial cities. Working primarily in the heavy manufacturing sector, these immigrants settled in their tightly knit community due to its close proximity to the steel mills and day-labor jobs where they worked. Between the end of World War II and 1970, the neighborhood represented one of the most powerful political blocs in Cleveland's Democratic Party. By the end of the 1970s, many of the original inhabitants of Buckeye Road had migrated to the suburbs as they ascended the economic ladder, in large part due to the white flight which had produced similar migrations out of the inner city in many US metropolitan areas. by the beginning of the 21st century, only a handful of the Hungarian residents remained in a neighborhood that today is predominately African-American. Benedictine High School, a Catholic high school and perennial football- powerhouse that boasts Chuck Noll as an alumnus, is located just south of Buckeye on Martin Luther King Jr. Drive.

Points of interest, all of which are listed on the National Register of Historic Places include the closed St. Luke's Hospital, built in 1927, which is slated for re-development; St. Elizabeth of Hungary Catholic Church, built in 1892; and the Weizer Building, built in 1928.

Historical population
Year	Pop.	±%
1940	19,537	—
1950	20,684	+5.9%
1960	19,066	−7.8%
1970	18,496	−3.0%
1980	16,347	−11.6%
1990	15,676	−4.1%
2000	16,063	+2.5%
2010	12,470	−22.4%
2020	11,680	−6.3%

== Education ==
In September 1912, the Cleveland Board of Education ceded an area at the eastern end of Buckeye–Shaker, around what would later become Shaker Square, to the Shaker Heights Board of Education. Currently, Moreland Boulevard serves as the dividing line, with homes and businesses along Moreland and to the east being within the Shaker Schools and Library District and thus paying taxes, including real estate taxes, and participating in elections for the Shaker Heights City School District and Shaker libraries. Households and businesses west of Moreland continue to be part of the Cleveland Metropolitan School District and Cleveland libraries. Because of the ability to send their children to Shaker Schools, there has historically been a large number of individuals who work in Cleveland, particularly in city government, who live in the Shaker Schools area, or Buckeye–Shaker. This anomaly also led to this area being the center of Cleveland's black middle class prior to the integration of Shaker Heights.
