= Weizer Building (11801 Buckeye Road, Cleveland) =

- U.S. National Register of Historic Places
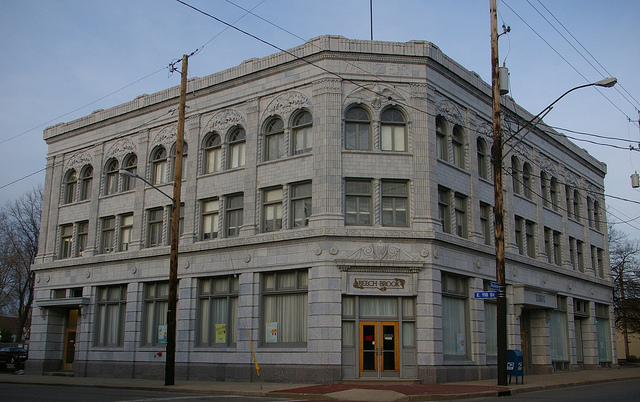

- Location within Cleveland Location within Ohio Location within the United States
- Location: 11801 Buckeye Rd., Cleveland, Ohio
- Coordinates: 41°28′52″N 81°36′2″W
- Area: less than one acre
- Built: 1925
- Architect: Hradilek, Henry; Thomas, Arthur
- Architectural style: Beaux Arts
- NRHP reference No.: 02001360
- Added to NRHP: November 21, 2002

The Weizer Building at 11801 Buckeye Rd. in Cleveland, Ohio was built in 1925. It was listed on the National Register of Historic Places in 2002. It is a Beaux Arts style building.

In 2017, the building is a mental health treatment facility, Beech Brook Outpatient.

== See also ==
- Weizer Building (8935 Buckeye Road, Cleveland, Ohio)
