= Hinsdale =

Hinsdale may refer to:

== Places ==
In the United States:

- Hinsdale, Illinois
  - Hinsdale station, on Metra's BNSF Line
- Hinsdale, Massachusetts
- Hinsdale, Montana
- Hinsdale, New Hampshire, a New England town
  - Hinsdale (CDP), New Hampshire, the main village in the town
- Hinsdale, New York
- Hinsdale County, Colorado

== People ==
- George A. Hinsdale (1826-1874), American lawyer and politician
- Grace Webster Haddock Hinsdale (1832–1902), American author
- Reynold Hinsdale (1878–1934), American architect

== Other uses ==
- USS Hinsdale (APA-120), US Navy ship named for Hinsdale County, Colorado
