= Tavern Club =

Tavern Club may refer to:

- Tavern Club (Boston, Massachusetts), a private club
- Tavern Club (Cleveland, Ohio), listed on the National Register of Historic Places
- Tavern Club, a social club that was on Michigan Avenue in Chicago
