= The Angel of Death Victorious =

Bronze statue by Herman Matzen

- Haserot Angel
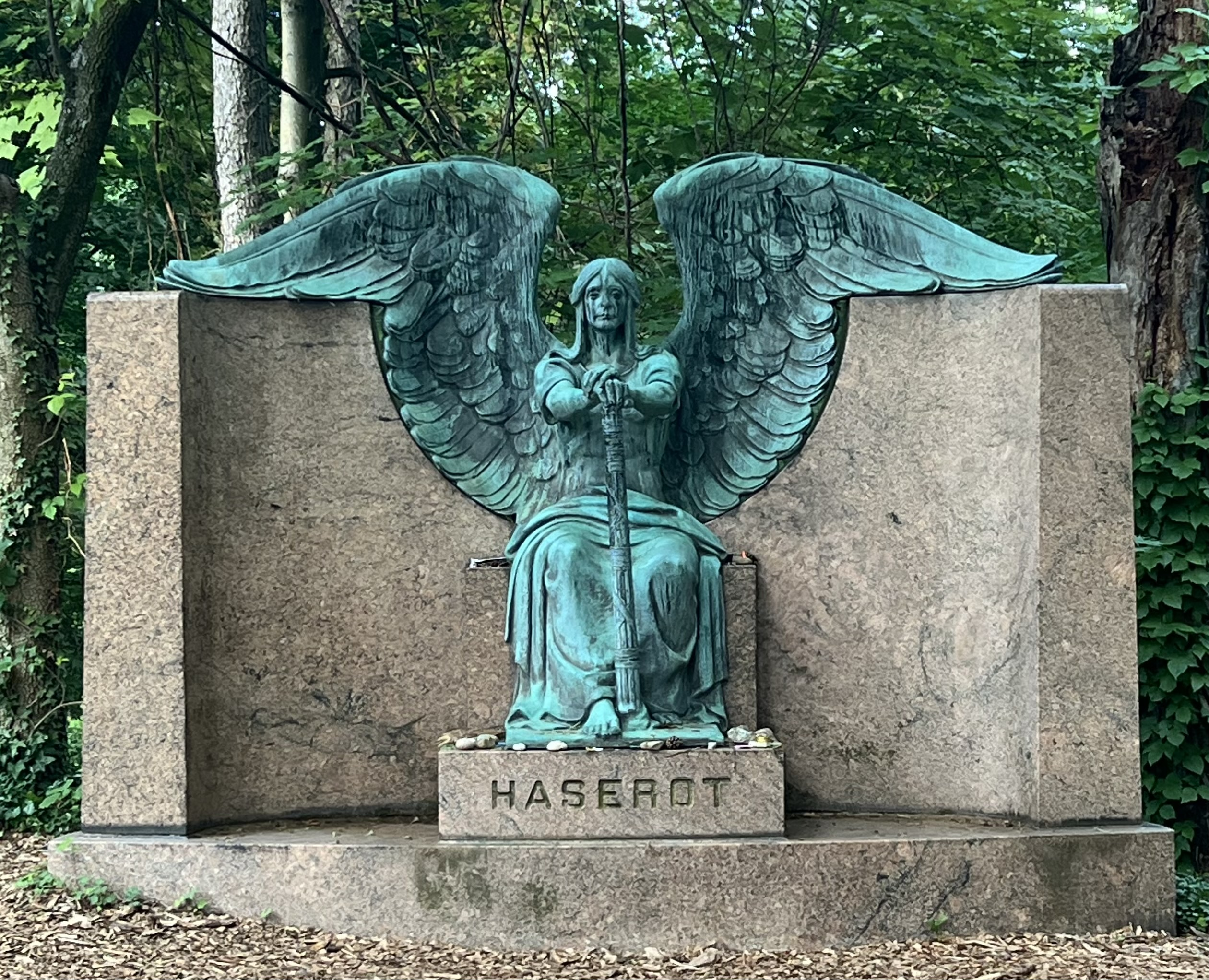
- Bronze statue in Lake View Cemetery
- Artist: Herman Matzen
- Year: 1923
- Medium: Bronze
- Dimensions: 160 cm × 260 cm (5.4 ft × 8.4 ft)
- Location: Cleveland Heights, Ohio; 41°30′46.97″N 81°35′25.38″W

The Angel of Death Victorious, commonly known as the Haserot Angel, is a bronze sculpture located in the Cleveland Heights, Ohio portion of Lake View Cemetery. It depicts an angel seated on a polished marble base holding an inverted torch, and was created by artist Herman Matzen. The sculpture has become a tourist destination in part for the black "tears" apparent on the angel’s face resulting from oxidation of the metal over time.

== Description ==
The statue was commissioned by industrialist Francis Henry Haserot, president of the Haserot Company of Cleveland, after the death of his wife in 1919. Herman Matzen, an Ohio-based sculptor from Denmark was commissioned to create the grave marker, which was initially made in clay. The angel has in recent years become a haunted attraction, with reports of tourists seeing, hearing, or otherwise experiencing strange paranormal phenomena.

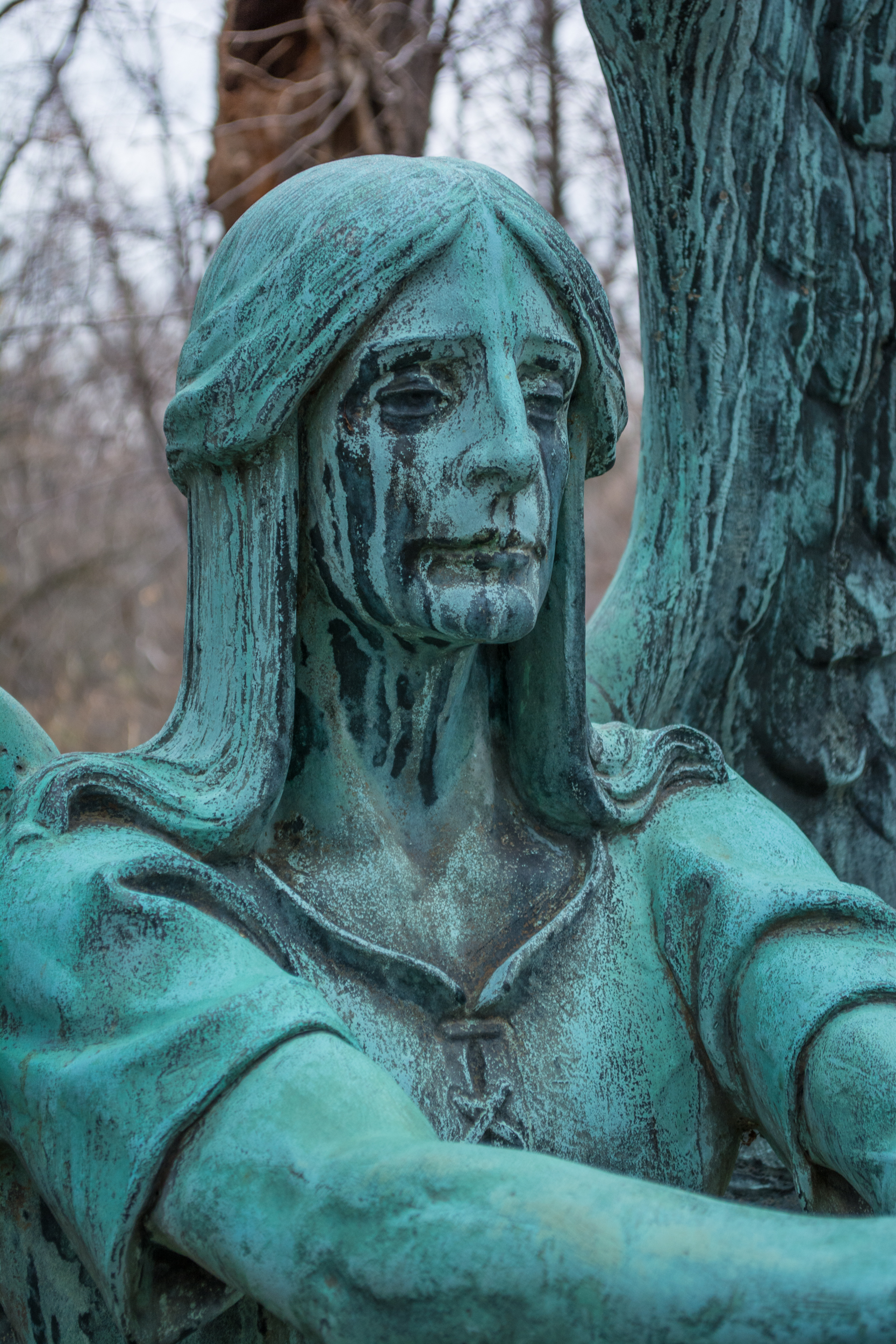
Detail of the sculpture showing the oxidation that resembles tears

== Popular Culture ==
- The cover of the extended play "Open the Mind to Discomfort" (2015), by the metalcore/sludge metal band Will Haven, from Sacramento, California.
- The cover of the studio album titled Reluctant Hero by American heavy metal supergroup band Killer Be Killed, from Los Angeles, California. The cover was selected after a declaration by Max Cavalera in an interview with Revolver; this was in a period where he was looking for "black metal" images through National Geographic magazines.
