= J. Milton Dyer =

American architect (1870–1957)

- Born: April 22, 1870; Middletown, Pennsylvania
- Died: May 27, 1957 (aged 87); Cleveland, Ohio
- Burial place: Woodland Cemetery, Cleveland
- Education: Central High School; Case Institute of Technology; Ecole nationale superieure des Beaux-Arts
- Occupation: Architect

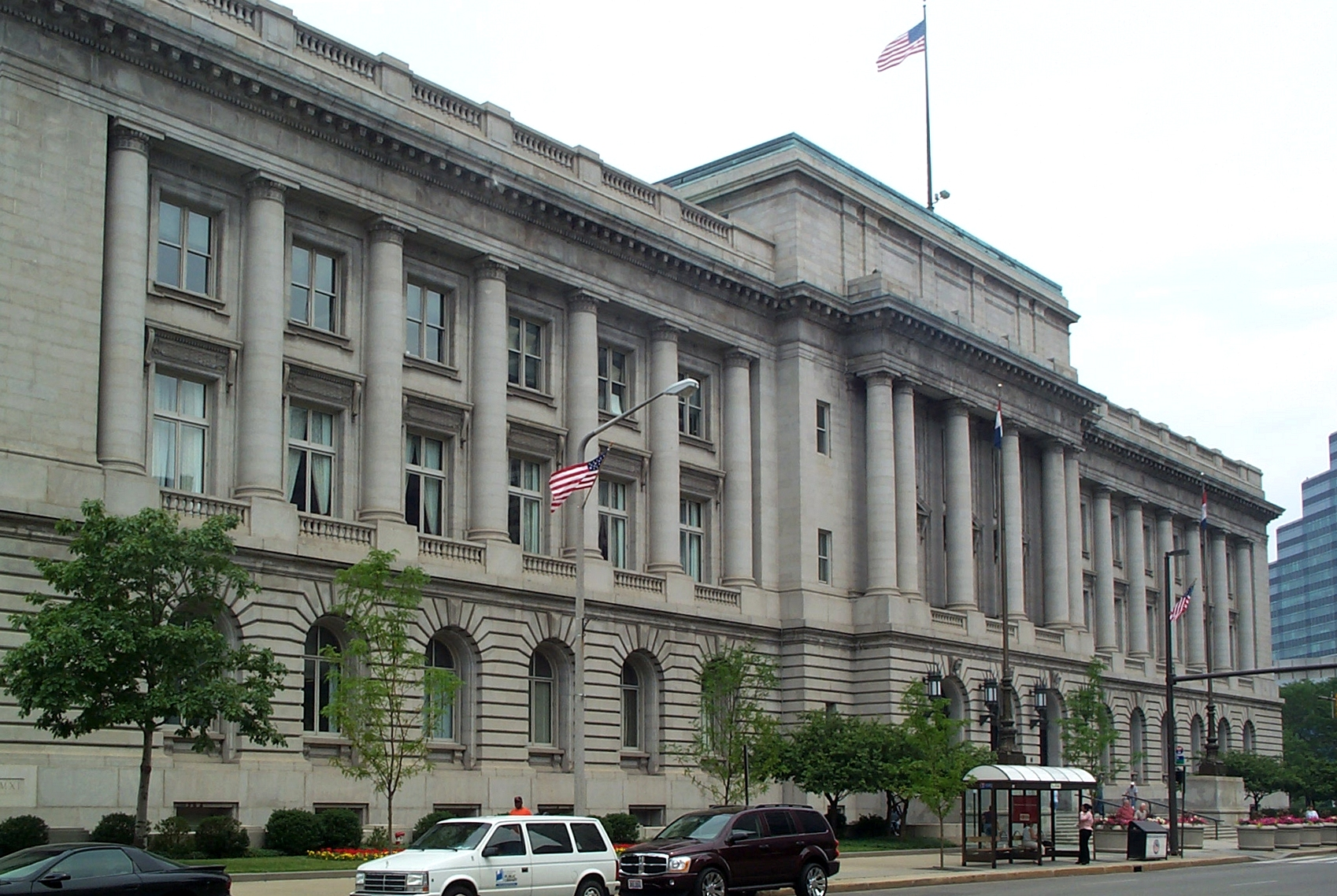
Cleveland City Hall

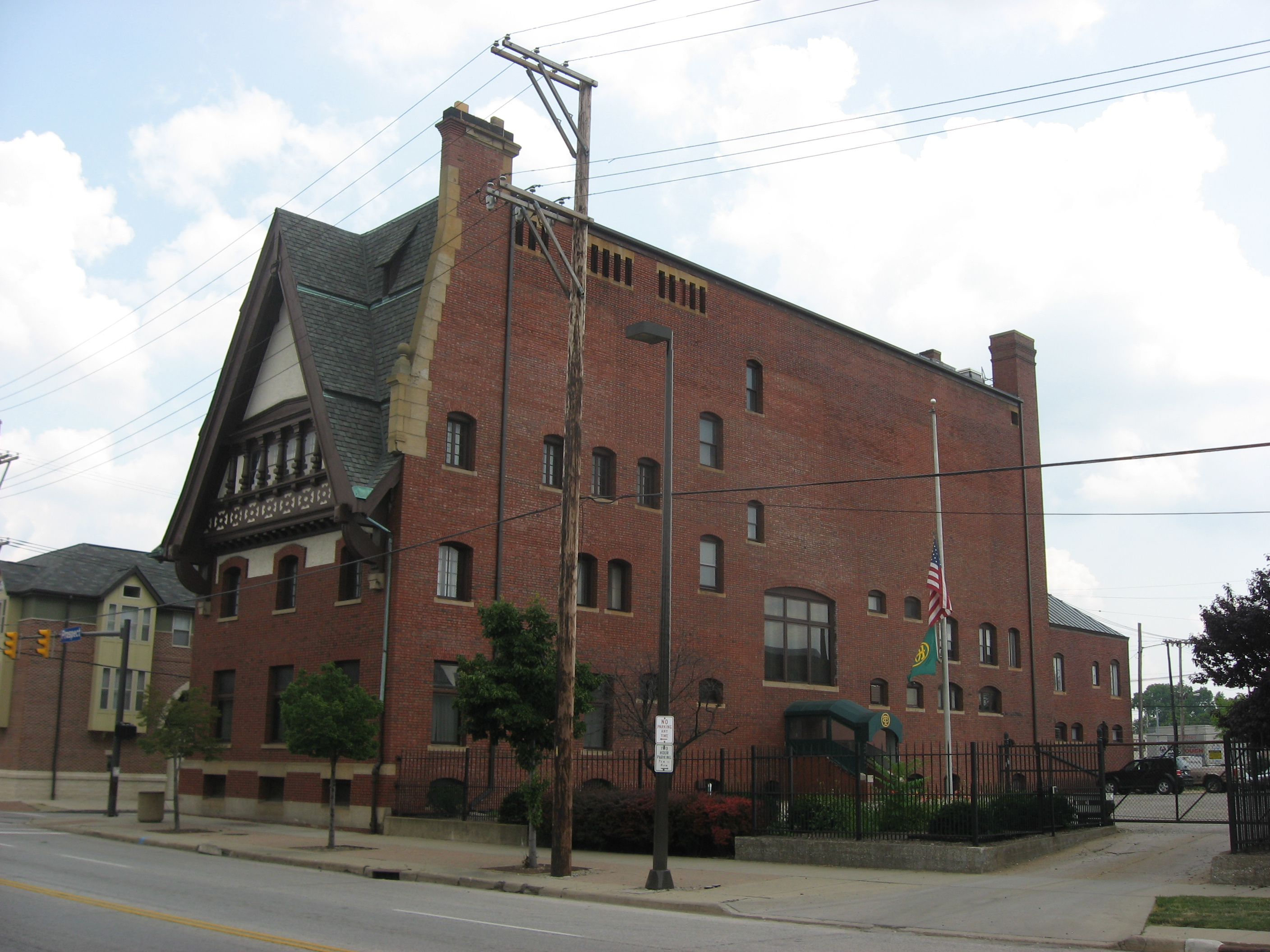
Tavern Club in Cleveland

J. Milton Dyer (April 22, 1870 – May 27, 1957) was an American architect based in Cleveland, Ohio.

== Background ==
Dwyer was born in Middletown, Pennsylvania where his father had a hardware business. In 1881 his family moved to the Rock's Corners area (near East 55th and Woodland Avenue) and Dyer attended Central High School, worked for Brown Hoisting where he earned a scholarship to Case Institute of Technology. He later studied at the École nationale supérieure des Beaux-Arts in Paris.

== Professional career ==
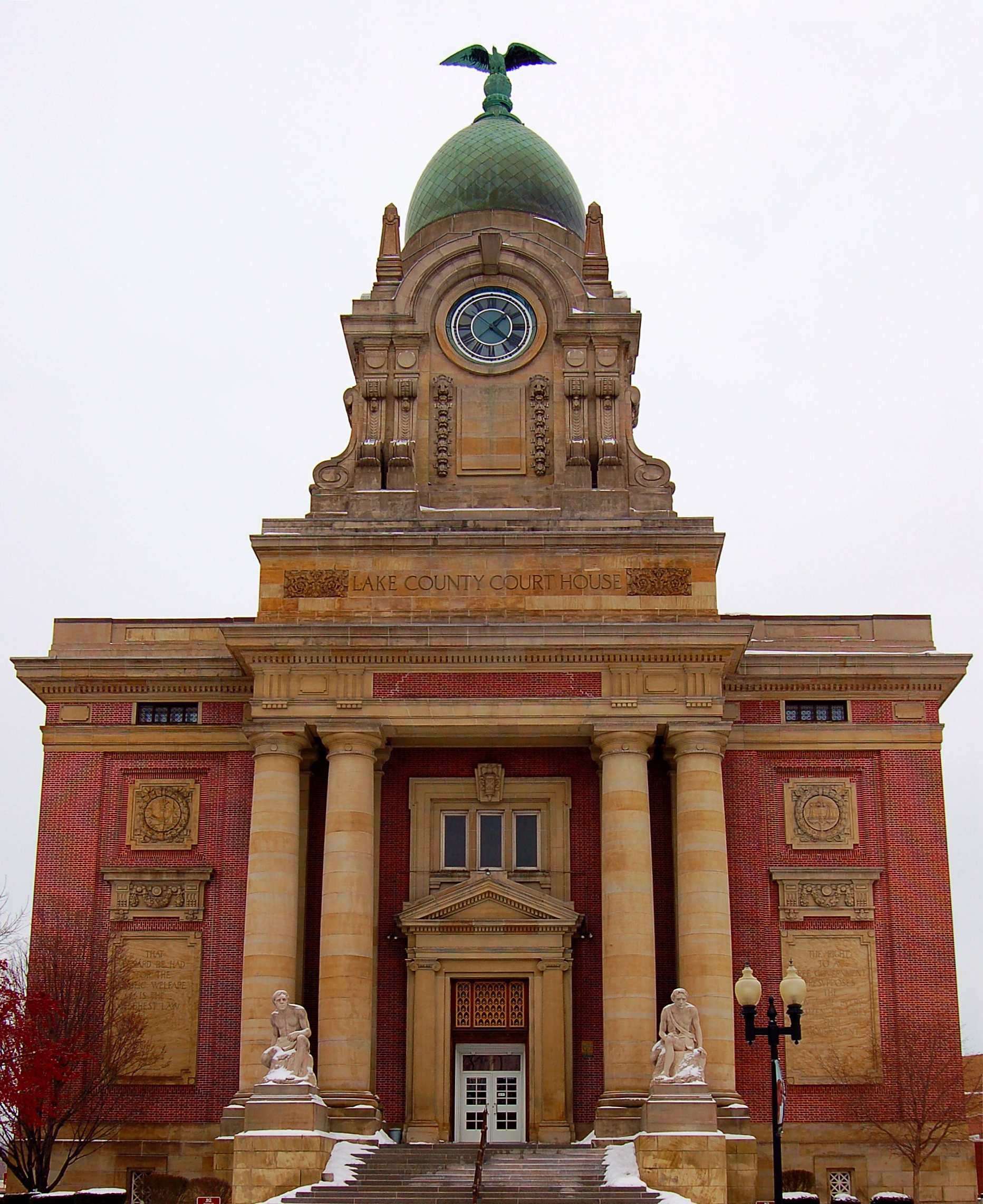
Lake County, Ohio Courthouse, Painesville, Ohio

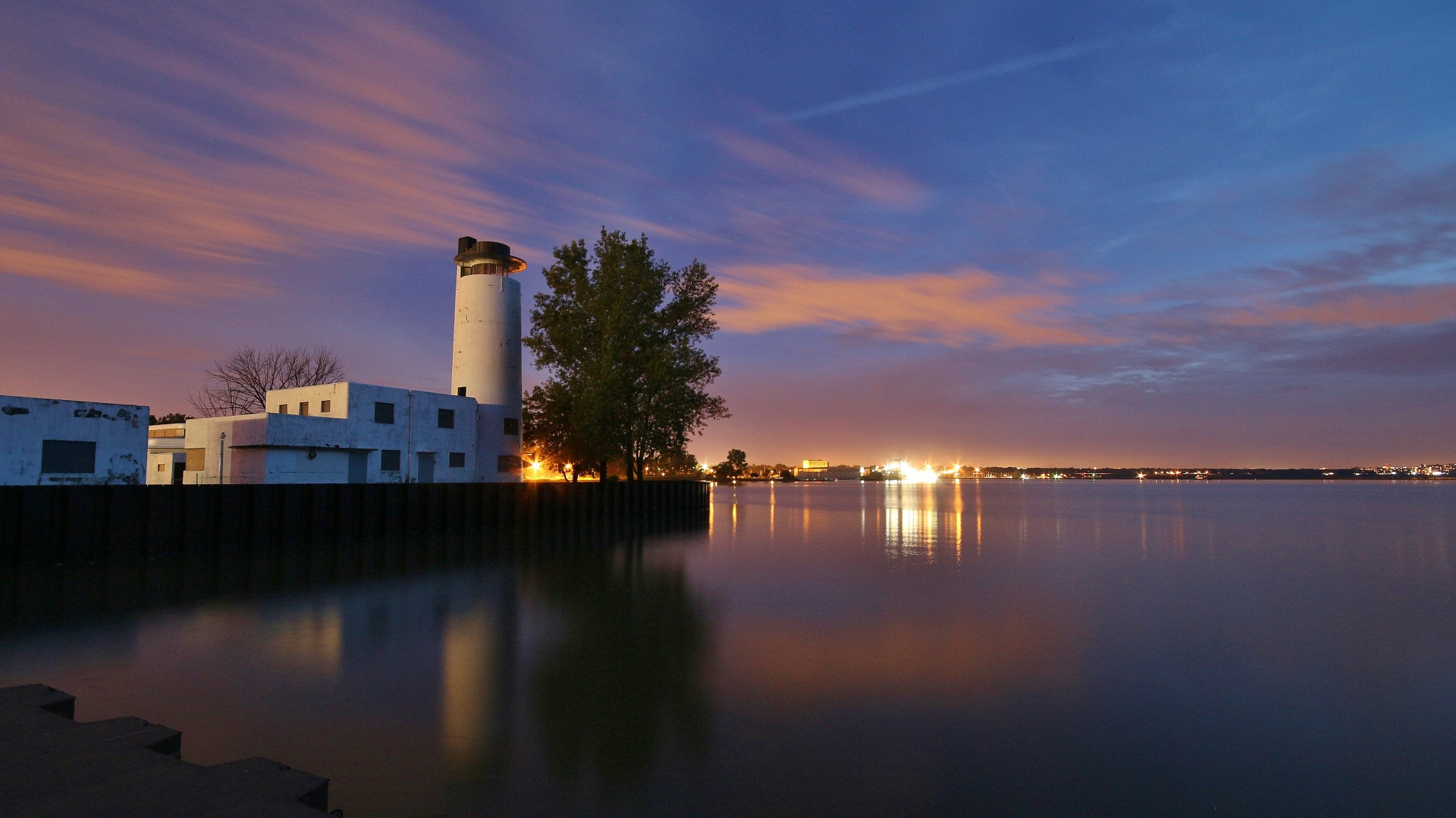
Coast guard station at Cleveland's Whiskey Island

He worked for Warner & Swasey (Ambrose Swasey and Worcester R. Warner's firm) for several years, and Frank Walker, Henry Weeks, and Reynold Hinsdale worked in his office. The Architectural Record published a 1906 feature that noted him as an example of professionally educated architects moving to smaller cities.

Dyer became a member of Cleveland's Tavern Club, established 1892–93, and when his design of a building for the group won a club architect selection contest, and the club offered him membership as part of the design contract. The club moved from a leased property at 968 Prospect Street to the Dyer building on 1 January 1905. "The exterior construction and the traditional interior decor of the building" have remained essentially the same since the club's beginning. He designed several buildings on Cleveland's Euclid Avenue.

== Spirit of Progress ==
J. Milton Dyer was selected as the architect for an exhibition of Cleveland products staged in 1909 called the Spirit of Progress. Erected in 47 days (March 30-May 24), the Exposition Building is said to have had "a larger ground floor exhibit area than any other exposition structure in the United States" with 72,030 square feet (6,692 m^{2}) as well as the area of an armory and a bridge connecting the two buildings, for "a grand total of 114,656 square feet, a space greatly in excess of that of any previous home product exhibition".

The building included "wood covered with staff, and the fireproofed and waterproofed canvas roof is supported by three huge masts mounted on structural iron supports which are anchored to thirty-ton blocks of iron-weighted concrete. From these supports quarter-poles are extended, adding strength to the network of steel cables that holds the roof. At the west of the main building is a Pompeiian garden of novel design and with original features." The interior walls were covered with white bunting and "fountains, statuary, flowers, and shrubbery" used for effect. Dwyer designed two massive statues that were carried out by sculptor Herman Matzen placed in the approach to the exhibition.

Promotion was carried out by: "One million Exposition gum seals, more than 1700 monthly proof-sheets, 25,000 invitation booklets, and 100,000 postcards were printed and circulated; and 15,000 posters and window cards were distributed locally and through all cities and towns within a radius of 200 miles. A slogan competition drew out 3,000 participants." A souvenir book of the Exposition contained a directory of the exhibitors, a "classified" list of Cleveland manufacturers, and "other matter pertaining to local industries". Entertainment included the "best" local bands, J. Powell Jones and the boy chorus of 500, and "other features of a high class character".

== Personal life ==
Dwyer lived with his mother on East 71st Street, until she died in 1923, and he never married. After his mother died he lived with his sister until she died in 1954. He is buried in Woodland Cemetery in Cleveland.

== Selected works ==
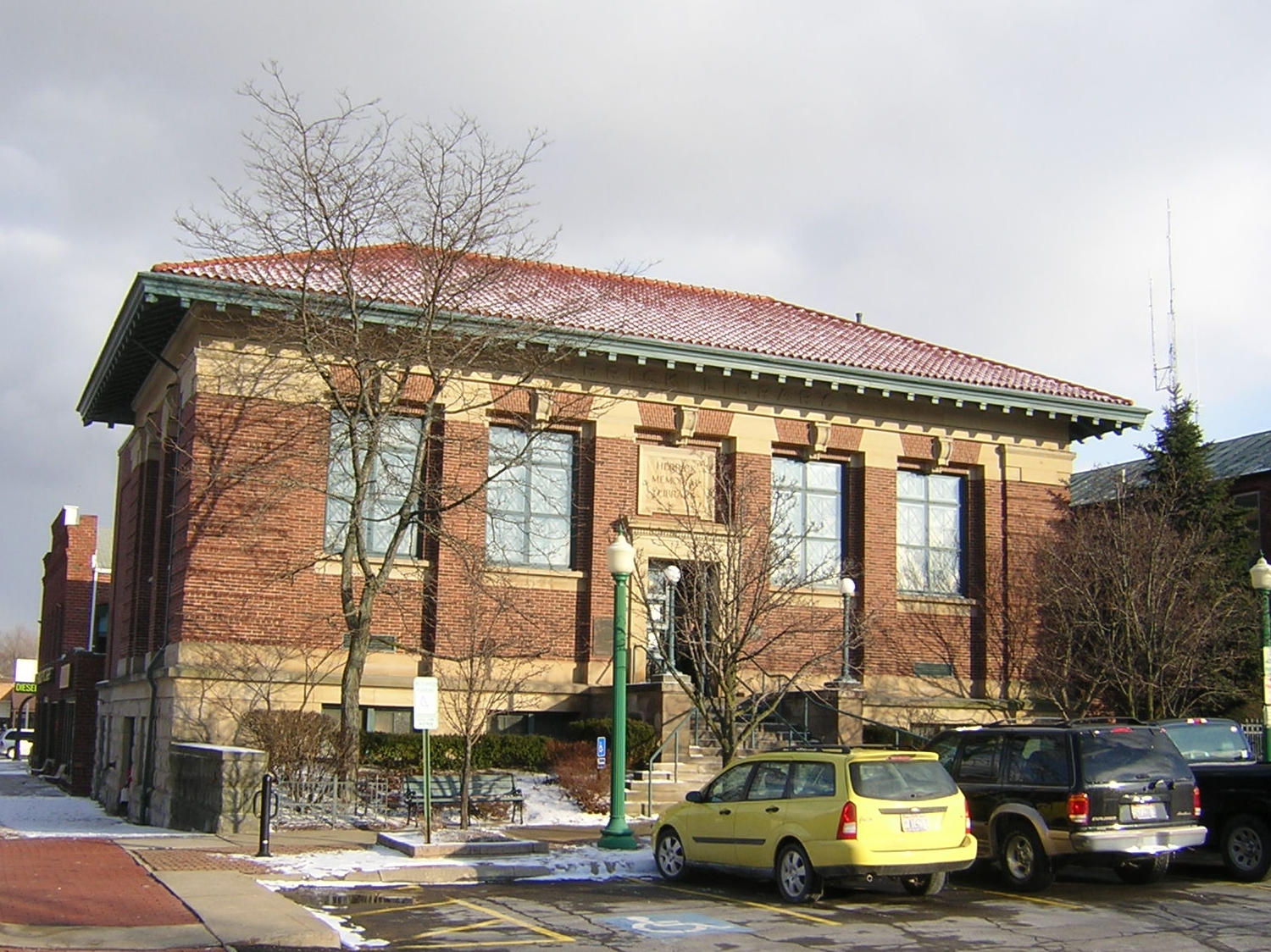
Herrick Memorial Library in Wellington, Ohio

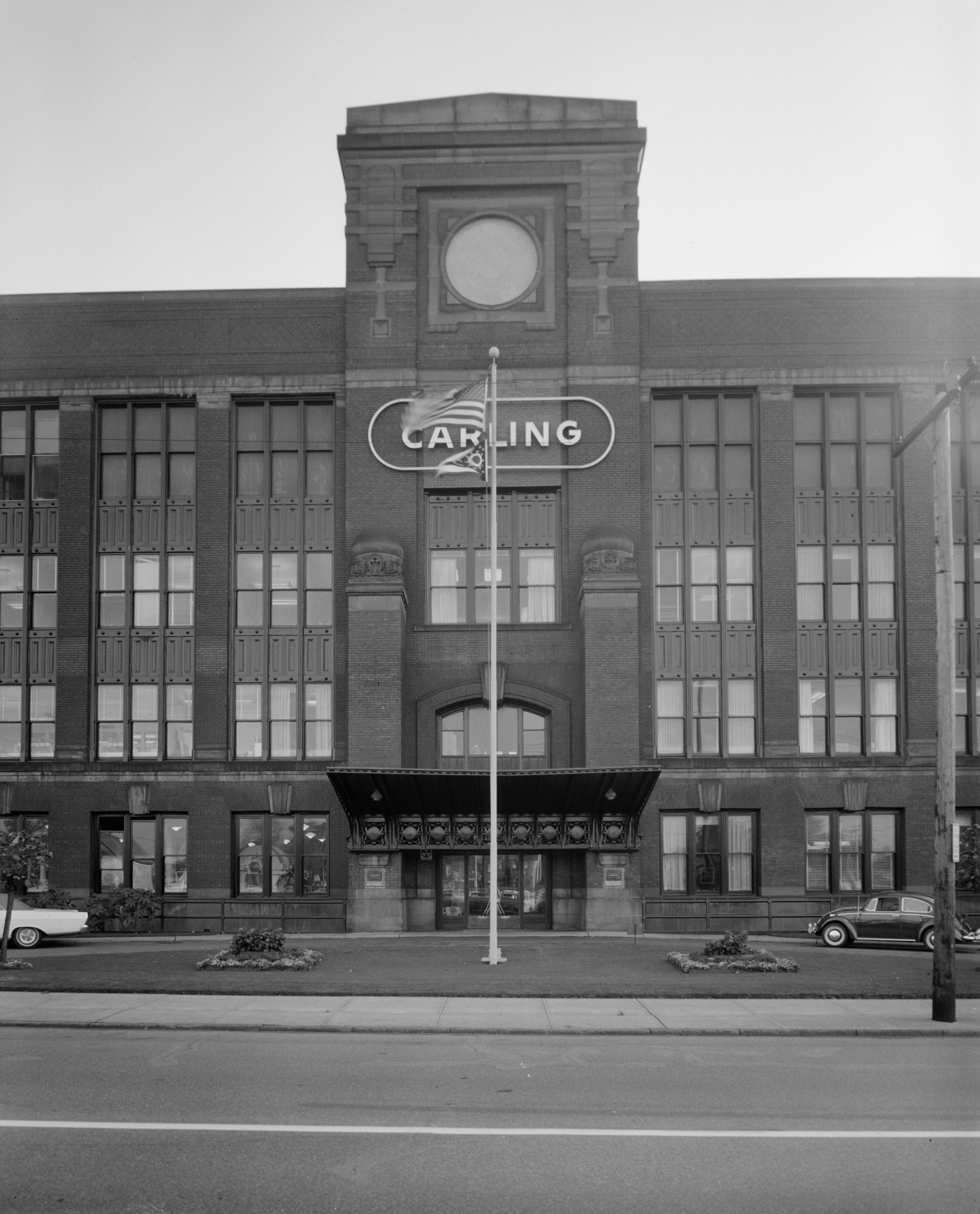
Peerless Motor Company Plant No. 1 after it became Carling Brewing Company (photo from 1965)

(Believed to be still in existence unless otherwise noted)

- Anderson Hall/ Asheville School (1899) Asheville, North Carolina
- G. C. Kuhlman Car Company (1901) Cleveland, a railway car and later steel "bus" body producing company established by Gustav Kuhlman
- Republic Oil Company (1901) Cleveland
- Herrick Memorial Library (1902) Wellington, Ohio(enlarged after banker Myron T. Herrick gave an additional bequest)
- First Methodist Church (1903–04), 3000 Euclid Ave.
- Brooklyn Bank Building (1904) 3764 West 25th Street Cleveland /Farnsworth Building (Brooklyn Savings and Loan), 3764-70 Pearl Rd.
- Windermere Presbyterian Church East Cleveland
- Guardian Trust Building (1904-demolished) 322-326 Euclid Avenue
- Tavern Club, Cleveland (1904/1905) 3522 Prospect Avenue Cleveland
- First Methodist Church, Cleveland (1905) 3000 Euclid Avenue Cleveland
- Peerless Motor Car factory (1906 demolished)
- Summit County Courthouse (1906–1908) 209 South High Street Akron, Ohio sculpture by Herman Matzen
- Westminster Presbyterian Church (1907)
- Taylor's Department Store and Arcade (1907)
- 1574 East 108th Street residence (1908) Cleveland
- Lake County Courthouse, Painesville, Ohio, (1907–09) sculpture by Herman Matzen
- Ferris Residence Cleveland (1909)
- 11101 Magnolia Drive Residence (1909) Cleveland
- Swasey Observatory (1909) Granville, Ohio
- Spirit of Progress (1909 exhibition)
- Cleveland Music School Settlement (E. S. Burke House), 11125 Magnolia Dr. (1909)
- 11125 Magnolia Drive residence (1910) Cleveland
- M.T. Silver Company (1911) Cleveland
- Cleveland Athletic Club (1911)
- Reserve Terminals 1300 East 45th Street, Cleveland
- U.S. Treasury San Francisco Building (1915) 301 Pine Street San Francisco, California (original Pacific Coast Stock Exchange building that was remodeled in 1930?)
- Cleveland City Hall (1911–1916) 601 Lakeside Ave., NE
- Premier Industries (1920) 4409 Euclid Avenue Cleveland
- Coast Guard Station, Cleveland (1940) 1 Lake Erie/ United States Coast Guard Cleveland Harbor Station, 1000 Cuyahoga River
- Cooley Farms North of Warrensville Heights off Ohio 175, Warrensville Heights, Ohio
- East Point Manor South Shore Drive, Middle Bass Island, Ohio
- Edward W. and Louise C. Moore Estate 7960 Garfield Rd. Mentor, Ohio
- Jay M. Pickands House 9619 Lake Shore Blvd Bratenahl, Ohio
- Central National Bank (demolished) Cleveland
- First National Bank (demolished) Cleveland
- Venice Building 8401—8417 Euclid Avenue in Cleveland, Ohio (demolished 2003)

== See also ==
- National Register of Historic Places listings in Cleveland
