= Reluctant Hero =

Studio album by Killer Be Killed
- Released: November 20, 2020
- Studio: Hybrid Studios
- Genres: Groove metal; alternative metal
- Length: 47:42
- Label: Nuclear Blast
- Producer: Josh Wilbur

Killer Be Killed chronology
Killer Be Killed (2014)	Reluctant Hero (2020)

Singles from Reluctant Hero
- 1. "Deconstructing Self-Destruction" Released: September 4, 2020; 2. "Dream Gone Bad" Released: October 13, 2020; 3. "Inner Calm from Outer Storms" Released: November 6, 2020; 4. "From a Crowded Wound" Released: November 20, 2020

Reluctant Hero is the second studio album by American heavy metal band Killer Be Killed. It was released on November 20, 2020, by Nuclear Blast.

== Writing ==
The band began writing the album in 2016, before going to Hybrid Studios in California in 2018 to record the music. They then finished recording the vocals in 2019.

== Cover artwork ==
In an interview, guitarist Max Cavalera discussed the origins of the album cover:

"I'm really happy with how it came out, because I wasn't happy with the first one. I have a lot of these National Geographic magazines at home, and one had a story about haunted places in America. One of them was this cemetery in Cleveland, which has this really cool statue of an angel with a sword. I thought it would look so badass on an album cover — it almost looks like black metal — so I suggested to our label to find someone to go over and take a picture of the statue."

== Singles ==
On September 4, 2020, Killer Be Killed announced the release of the album, along with the first single "Deconstructing Self-Destruction".

The second single "Dream Gone Bad" was released on October 13, 2020.

On November 6, 2020, the third single "Inner Calm from Outer Storms" was released. In a press release, bass guitarist Troy Sanders said the single is "about having the ability to sense a distant or unseen target. It explores a journey of reckless abandon where the destination may, or may not, actually exist." The single also featured on Consequence of Sound's Top 30 Metal & Hard Rock Songs of 2020.

The fourth single, "From a Crowded Wound", was released on November 20, 2020, the same day as the album release.

== Critical reception ==
Professional ratings
Review scores
Source	Rating
Exclaim!	8/10
Kerrang!	4/5 stars
Louder Sound	4/5 stars
Spectrum Culture	75%
Sputnikmusic	3.2/5

Reluctant Hero was met with generally favorable reviews from critics. Aggregator Album of the Year gave the release a 78 out of 100 based on a critical consensus of six reviews.

Max Heilman of Exclaim! said the songs on the release are "elevating poppy ideas with explosive, multilayered musicality and hard-hitting emotion. Reluctant Hero proves metal can be catchy without being stupid."

=== Accolades ===
Publications' year-end list appearances for Reluctant Hero
Critic/Publication	List	Rank	Ref
Consequence of Sound	Top 30 Metal/Hard Rock Albums of 2020	21	
Kerrang!	Top 50 Albums of 2020	22	
Loudwire	Top 70 Rock/Metal Albums of 2020	N/A	
Revolver	Top 25 Albums of 2020	9	

== Track listing ==
All tracks are written by Killer Be Killed.

No.	Title	Length
1.	"Deconstructing Self-Destruction"	4:33
2.	"Dream Gone Bad"	4:15
3.	"Left of Center"	3:30
4.	"Inner Calm from Outer Storms"	3:53
5.	"Filthy Vagabond"	3:48
6.	"From a Crowded Wound"	7:11
7.	"The Great Purge"	4:13
8.	"Comfort from Nothing"	4:18
9.	"Animus"	1:08
10.	"Dead Limbs"	4:48
11.	"Reluctant Hero"	6:05

== Personnel ==
Killer Be Killed

- Max Cavalera – guitars, vocals
- Greg Puciato – guitars, vocals
- Troy Sanders – bass, vocals
- Ben Koller – drums

Additional personnel

- Josh Wilbur – production, mixing, engineering
- Nick Rowe – engineering
- Cameron Rae – assistant engineering
- Ted Jensen – mastering
- Marcelo Vasco – cover artwork, design
- Hannah Verbeuren – band photography

== Charts ==
Sales chart performance for Reluctant Hero
Chart (2020)	Peak position
Australian Albums (ARIA)	45
Belgian Albums (Ultratop Wallonia)	46
German Albums (Offizielle Top 100)	52
Hungarian Albums (MAHASZ)	35
Swiss Albums (Schweizer Hitparade)	69
US Top Hard Rock Albums (Billboard)	16
US Top Album Sales (Billboard)	47
