= Brooklyn Bank Building =

- U.S. National Register of Historic Places
- U.S. Historic district – Contributing property
- U.S. Historic district – Contributing property
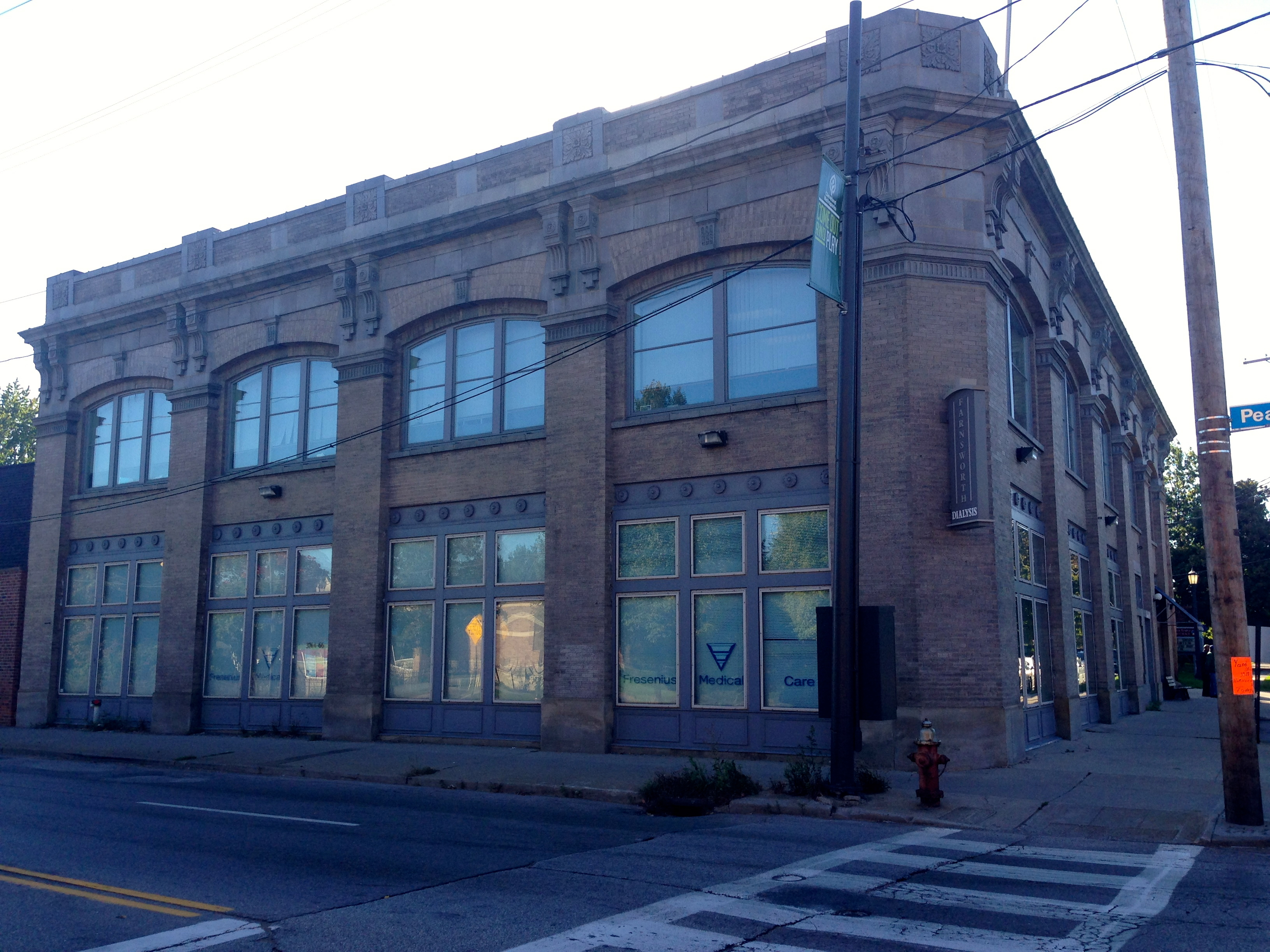

- Location within Cleveland Location within Ohio Location within the United States
- Location: 3764 W. 25th Street, Cleveland, Ohio, U.S.
- Coordinates: 41°27′09″N 81°42′06.3″W
- Built: 1904
- Architect: J. Milton Dyer
- Architectural style: Mix of Neoclassical and Victorian
- Part of: Archwood Avenue Historic District, Brooklyn Centre Historic District (ID87000428; 05001576)
- NRHP reference No.: 84002912

Significant dates
- Added to NRHP: July 19, 1984
- Designated NRHP: July 19, 1984
- Designated CP: March 19, 1987
- Designated CP: March 4, 1999

The Brooklyn Bank Building is a historic bank structure located in Cleveland, Ohio, in the United States. Designed in 1904 prominent Cleveland architect J. Milton Dyer as a home for the Brooklyn Savings and Loan Association, the building exhibits a mix of architectural styles, including Neoclassical and Commercial, typical of Dyer's eclectic work.

The structure was added to the National Register of Historic Places (NRHP) on July 19, 1984. It was listed as a contributing property to the Archwood Avenue Historic District, which was added to the NRHP on March 19, 1987. It was listed as a contributing property to the Brooklyn Centre Historic District, which was added to the NRHP on March 4, 1999.

== About the building ==
The Brooklyn Savings and Loan Association was incorporated on May 25, 1888, in Brooklyn Village (now Brooklyn Centre) near Cleveland, Ohio.

In early 1904, the bank commissioned local architect Charles E. Tousley to design a $40,000 ($1,400,000 in 2025 dollars) mixed-use structure to be the bank's new headquarters. By April, Tousley had delivered plans for a four-story structure consisting of ground floor retail space and apartments on the upper three floors. Tousley's structure was priced at $50,000 ($1,800,000 in 2025 dollars), and the bank declined to implement his plans and refused to pay him for his work. Tousley sued, and won his case in the Court of Common Pleas. The ruling was overturned by the 8th Ohio District Court of Appeals, and the appellate court's ruling affirmed by the Supreme Court of Ohio (Brooklyn Savings & Loan Ass'n Co. v. Tousley, 35 Ohio Cir. Ct. R. 613; aff'd Tousley v. Brooklyn Savings & Loan Ass'n, 89 N.E. 1126, 80 Ohio St. 737).

The bank then turned to noted local architect J. Milton Dyer. In August 1904, Dyer finished plans for a two-story mixed-use structure. These met the construction cap, and contracts were let. Contractors working on the building included F. & D. Lindhorst (masonry and terra cotta); J. Callaghan & Son (roof and sheet metal work); Pittsburgh Plate Glass (glass); Roebling Construction Co. (fireproofing); T.H. Brooks & Co. (iron and steel work); W.A. Eckerman Plumbing, Heating & Supply Co. (plumbing and steam heating); and the William Dunbar & Co. (carpentry). Construction was well under way by October, and it was completed by the end of the year. The bank occupied most of the ground floor, with additional space in the building filled by doctor's offices, lawyers, and realtors.

In 1901, Dyer embarked on a remarkably creative and prolific, 11-year period of architectural design that in time gave him a national reputation. He became so well known that Architectural Record devoted an entire article in November 1906 to his work.

The Brooklyn Savings and Loan building uses a diverse set of architectural styles. The structure is symmetrical and its elements tend to be regular and repetitive, which are elements of the Neoclassical style. There are deep segmental arches over the second-story windows are Late Victorian, however. The entablature seemingly supported by the piers as well as the brackets supporting the cornice are deliberately crude in order to give the building an individualized appearance. The structure is important to understanding the body of work Dyer created during his most prolific and creative period.

The Brooklyn Savings and Loan building was added to the National Register of Historic Places on July 19, 1984.

== Bibliography ==
- Corpus Juris Secundum: A Complete Restatement of the Entire American Law As Developed By All Reported Cases. Volume 6. St. Paul, Minn.: American Law Book Company. 1937.
- Ellis, Lloyd H. Jr. (2012). A Guide to Greater Cleveland's Sacred Landmarks. Kent, Ohio: Kent State University Press. ISBN 9781606351215.
- Johannesen, Eric (1979). Cleveland Architecture, 1876-1976. Cleveland: Western Reserve Historical Society. ISBN 9780911704211.
- Johannesen, Eric; Barlow, Margaret (2011). "Cleveland". In Marter, Joan M. (ed.). The Grove Encyclopedia of American Art. Volume 1. New York: Oxford University Press. ISBN 9780195335798.
- Ohio Historic Places Dictionary. Hamburg, Mich.: State History Publications. 2008. ISBN 9781878592705.
- Tossell, William John (1915). Reports of Cases Argued and Determined in the Ohio Circuit and Appeals Courts of Ohio. Norwalk, Ohio: The American Publishers Co.
- U.S. Commissioner of Labor (1894). Ninth Annual Report of the Commissioner of Labor. 1893. Building and Loan Associations (Report). Washington, D.C.: Government Printing Office.
