= Lake County Courthouse (Ohio) =

Local government building in the United States

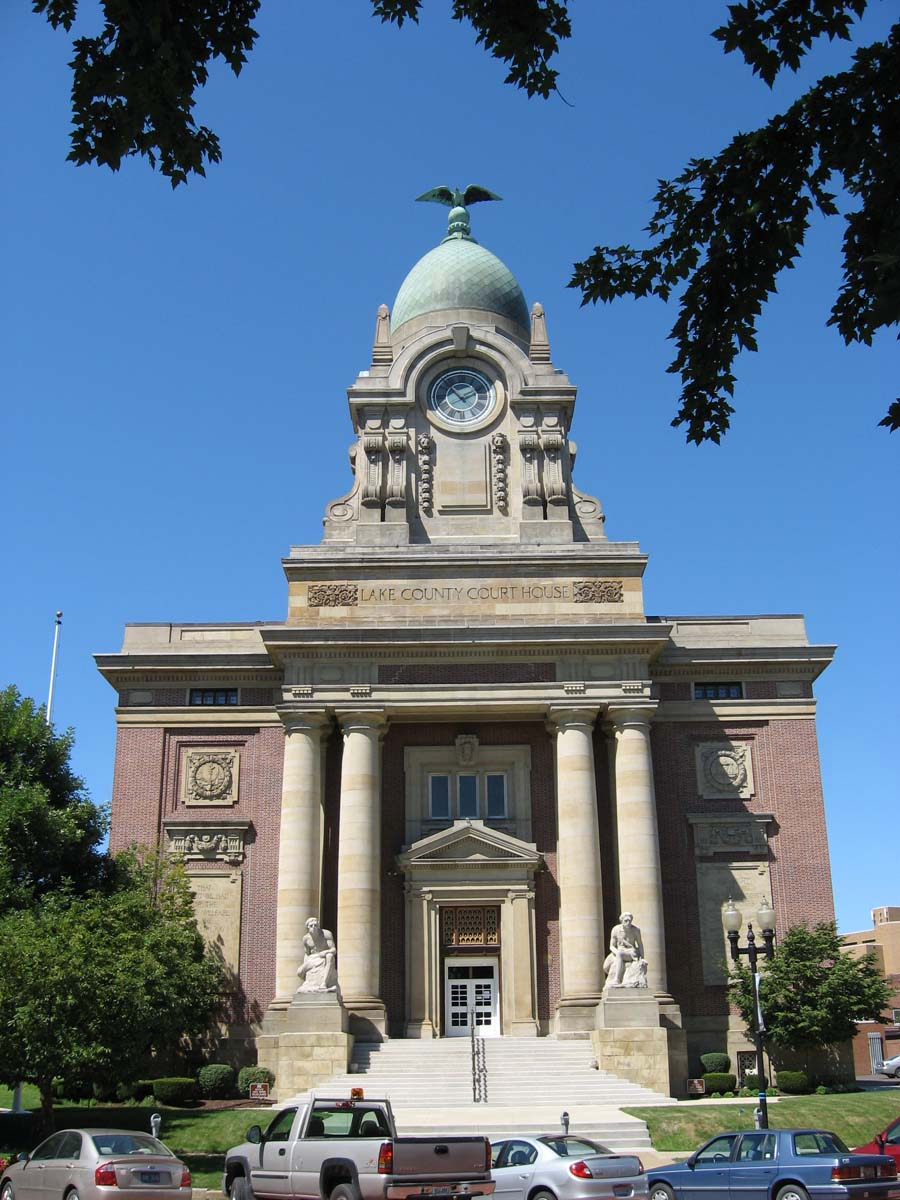
- Interactive map of the Lake County Courthouse area

General information
- Architectural style: Beaux-Arts
- Location: 47 North Park Place; Painesville, Ohio; United States
- Coordinates: 41.725°N 81.245°W
- Year built: 1909

Design and construction
- Architect: J. Milton Dyer

U.S. Historic district – Contributing property
- Designated: June 29, 2020
- Part of: Downtown Painesville Historic District
- Reference no.: 100005323

Lake County Courthouse located in Painesville, Ohio was designed in an eclectic Beaux-Arts style by Cleveland architect J. Milton Dyer. It was completed in 1909. The courthouse was designated a contributing property of the Downtown Painesville Historic District on June 29, 2020.

Dyer, a well known Cleveland, Ohio architect had previously collaborated with Cleveland sculptor Herman Matzen on the Summit County Courthouse, located in Akron, Ohio, in 1906. For the Lake County Courthouse Matzen produced evocative figures of Cain and Abel.
