= Hybrid Studios =

Southern California production facility

Coordinates: 33°42′23.8″N 117°55′22.3″W

- Type: Private
- Industry: Entertainment
- Genre: all
- Founded: 2013
- Founder: Patrick Akhamlich & William Klein
- Headquarters: Orange County, California, USA
- Services: film studio, recording studio
- Website: www.hybridstudiosca.com

Hybrid Studios is an American Southern California-based production facility that features an analog and digital recording studio alongside a sound stage. It is located at Shannon St, Santa Ana, California, in the center of Orange County, California. Hybrid Studios opened in late 2013. Founded by studio pro William Klein and video director Patrick Akhamlich.

Hybrid Studios won the 2014 AIA/OC Commercial Interiors Award.

== Recording studios ==
Hybrid's recording studios were designed by Hanson Hsu from Delta H Design. A "Mix Class of 2014" winning control room features a Solid State Logic 4064G+ analog console.

== Sound stage ==
Hybrid Studios serve as the shooting location for Blizzard's 'Beyond The Nexus', a talk show centered around the popular game Heroes of the Storm and especially its highly competitive professional circuit.

== Notable clients ==
Notable clients have included Trivium, Lamb of God, Korn, Phil Allen, Hanson Hsu, Warren Huart, Randy Jackson, John Nettlesbey, Aaron Johnson, Sam Martin, Ari Judah, Melanie Andrews, Lucas Pimentel, Luca, Lil' Nate Dogg, Adam Castilla, The Colourist, Robert Jon & the Wreck, Big Monsta, Bird & The War, Brian Frederick, Mike Willson, Jon O'Brien, David Bendeth, Alvin Taylor, Josh Stevens, VercityColab, Akorn, Artist Relations, growVISON, Well Hung Heart, Loren Smith, Finders Pictures, OC Music Awards, Blizzard Entertainment, Chapman University, and King Salamander.

In late 2014, the band Of Mice & Men recorded additional tracks for Restoring Force: Full Circle.

Hybrid Studios was a featured location on Real Housewives of Orange County. The episode, titled "Stage Moms and Dropped Bombs", was originally aired on September 19, 2016, and is the twelfth episode of season eleven on Bravo's long-running reality show.

Trivium issued their eighth studio album The Sin And The Sentence on October 20, 2017 through Roadrunner Records. The Sin And The Sentence was recorded with producer Josh Wilbur at Hybrid Studios.
