= First Methodist Church (Cleveland) =

Historic church in Ohio, United States

- U.S. National Register of Historic Places
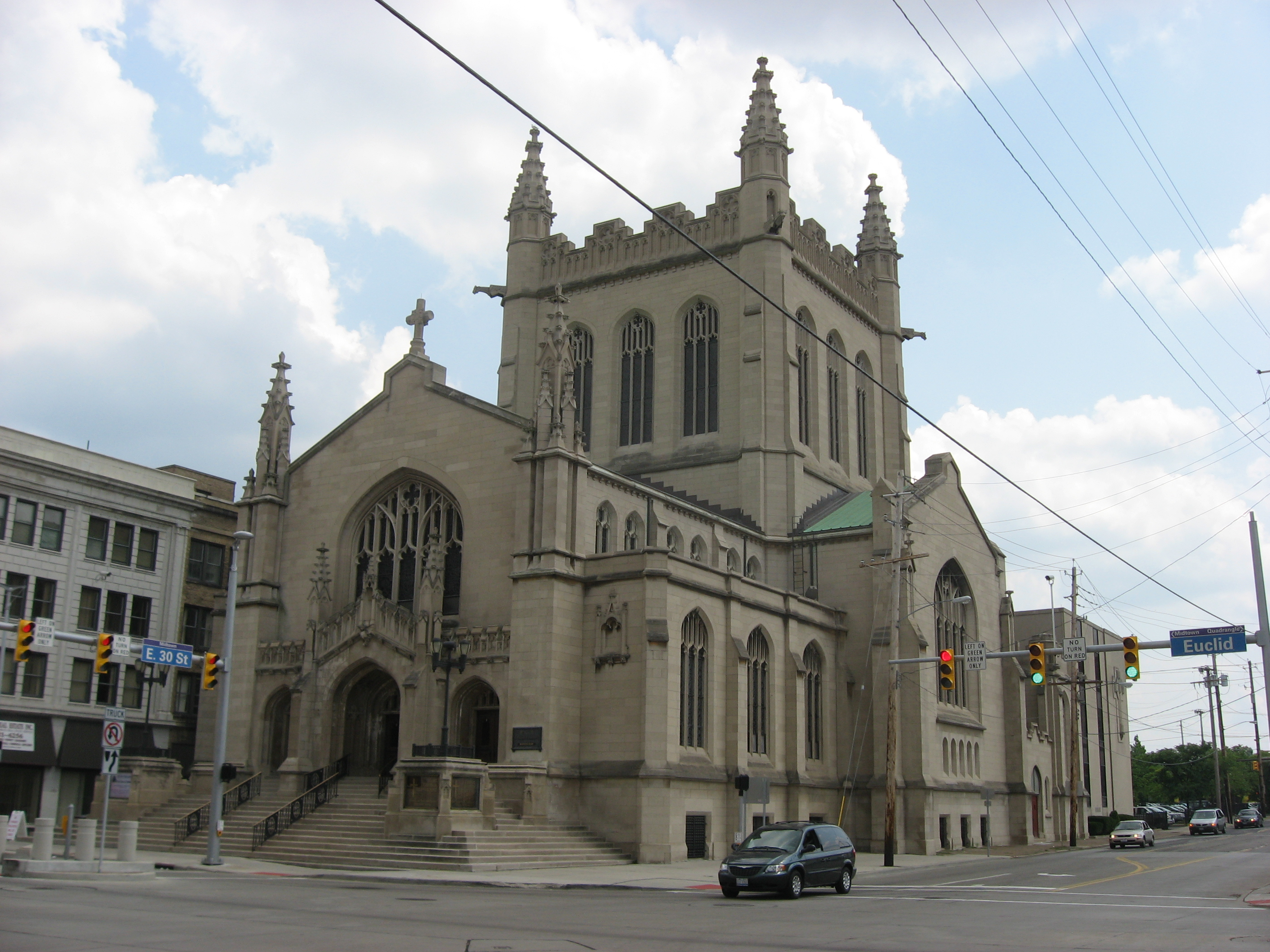

- Location within Cleveland Location within Ohio Location within the United States
- Location: 3000 Euclid Ave., Cleveland, Ohio
- Coordinates: 41°30′8″N 81°40′1″W
- Area: less than one acre
- Built: 1905
- Architect: Dyer, J. Milton; Mueller, Paul
- Architectural style: Late Gothic Revival
- MPS: Upper Prospect MRA
- NRHP reference No.: 84003953
- Added to NRHP: September 01, 1995

First Methodist Church is a historic church in the Central neighborhood on the east side of Cleveland, Ohio.

Located on the southeast corner of E.30th Street and Euclid Avenue, the church was built in 1905 and added to the National Register of Historic Places in 1995. In 2010, The congregation left the Euclid Avenue building to merge with Epworth-Euclid United Methodist Church to form University Circle United Methodist Church in Epworth-Euclid UMC's University Circle building. Euclid Avenue Congregational Church, whose building in the Fairfax neighborhood was destroyed in a fire in 2010, occupied the former First Methodist building from 2010 until mid-2014 before moving to a permanent building in South Euclid, a suburb of Cleveland. The former First Methodist building was put up for auction in 2018; by 2023, it had been converted into a banquet hall.
