= Killer Be Killed (album) =

Studio album by Killer Be Killed
- Released: May 9, 2014
- Recorded: September 2013, Fortress Studio (Los Angeles)
- Genres: Groove metal; alternative metal
- Length: 45:46
- Label: Nuclear Blast
- Producer: Josh Wilbur

Killer Be Killed chronology
Killer Be Killed (2014)	Reluctant Hero (2020)

Singles from Killer Be Killed
- 1. "Wings of Feather and Wax" Released: April 8, 2014

Killer Be Killed is the debut studio album by American heavy metal supergroup Killer Be Killed featuring Greg Puciato of the Dillinger Escape Plan, Max Cavalera of Soulfly/ex-Sepultura, Troy Sanders of Mastodon, and Dave Elitch of the Mars Volta. It was recorded in September 2013 at Fortress Studio in Los Angeles and released May 9, 2014 via Nuclear Blast Records. The album reached No. 58 on the U.S. Billboard 200 during its first week of release and sold around 5,500 copies.

== Reception ==
Professional ratings
Review scores
Source	Rating
All About the Rock	10/10 stars
Loudwire	4/5 stars
MetalSucks	4/5 stars
Ultimate Guitar	8.3/10

Killer Be Killed has been well received by critics. Writing for All About the Rock, Zack Slabbert said "From the opening track till the closing track this album thrusts into your mind and takes over. The vocals, guitaring, drumming and bass on this album is flawless." Alkahest of MetalSucks writes that Killer Be Killed "is a proper culmination of influences that represents each member's artistic lineage and talents in a manner that does each act's legacy justice."

== Track listing ==
All tracks are written by Killer Be Killed.

No.	Title	Length
1.	"Wings of Feather and Wax"	3:40
2.	"Face Down"	4:35
3.	"Melting of My Marrow"	4:38
4.	"Snakes of Jehovah"	4:01
5.	"Curb Crusher"	3:31
6.	"Save the Robots"	4:11
7.	"Fire to Your Flag"	2:31
8.	"I.E.D."	4:35
9.	"Dust into Darkness"	3:57
10.	"Twelve Labors"	4:29
11.	"Forbidden Fire"	5:38
Total length:		45:46

Vinyl bonus track
No.	Title	Length
12.	"Ghosts of Chernobyl"	4:11
Total length:		49:57

== Credits ==
Killer Be Killed

- Greg Puciato – vocals, rhythm guitar
- Max Cavalera – vocals, rhythm guitar
- Troy Sanders – bass, vocals
- David Elitch – drums, percussion

Additional musicians

- Juan Montoya – lead guitar

Production

- Josh Wilbur – production, mixing, mastering, engineering
- Paul Suarez – engineering
- Monte Conner – A&R

Artwork

- Ryan Clark – art direction, design
- Glen La Ferman – band photography

Management

- Gloria Cavalera - Management representation for Max Cavalera
- Nick John - Management representation for Troy Sanders
- Ryan J. Downey - Management representation for Greg Puciato
