= Robert Jon & the Wreck =

American music group

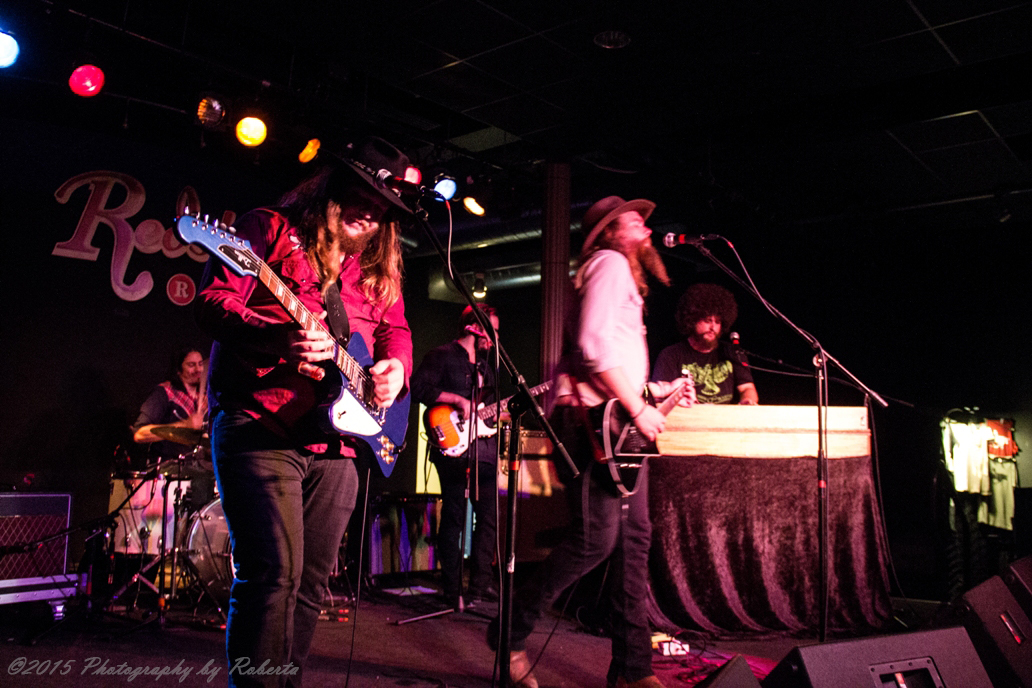

Background information
- Origin: Orange County, California, United States
- Genres: Blues rock, Southern rock
- Years active: 2011–present
- Label: Various
- Members: Robert Jon Burrison; Warren Murrel; Henry James (Schneekluth); Andrew Espantman; Jake Abernathie
- Past members: David Pelusi; Kristopher Butcher; Kyle Michael Neal; Steve Maggiora; Nick Phakpiseth; Derrick Wong
- Website: Official website

Robert Jon & the Wreck is an American five-piece blues rock and Southern rock band. Formed in Orange County, California, United States, in 2011, the ensemble has released several albums and toured extensively. Their 2021 album, Shine a Light on Me Brother, was described by one reviewer as their "best album to date which is saying a lot. It's a great album from start to finish".

== Career ==
The quintet began their journey in February 2011 in Orange County, California, United States. Within six months of their formation, Robert Jon & the Wreck had undertaken a national tour playing 60 shows and self-released their debut album, Fire Started. In 2013, the band released an EP, Rhythm of the Road, which was produced by Warren Huart and had been recorded at the Swing House Studios in Hollywood, Los Angeles. Robert Jon & the Wreck were named 'Best Live Band' at the 2013 Orange County Music Awards. In mid 2014, in between touring commitments, the band recorded a second EP, The RedBull Sessions, at RedBull Studios in Santa Monica, California. Less than six months later, Robert Jon & the Wreck recorded again, this time at the Sunset Sound Studios in Hollywood, with record producer Warren Huart once more in attendance. They amassed a ten track collection, Glory Bound, which was released on February 24, 2015.

In 2016, Huart helmed their next album, Good Life Pie, with the recording taking place at Hybrid Studios in Santa Ana, California. Good Life Pie was issued on May 13, 2016. By this stage the band were touring both the United States and parts of Europe on a regular basis, returning periodically to California to record. In 2017, they recorded Robert Jon & The Wreck, and reissued their earlier EPs into a compilation album, Wreckage: Vol.1. In addition that year, line-up changes took place with Henry James (Schneekluth) and Warren Murel both joining the band. The ensuing European trip included their appearance at the Moulin Blues Fest in Ospel, Netherlands. Their self-titled album was finally released in May 2018.

In May 2019, the band issued their next studio album, Take Me Higher, which had been conceived and written with the new members, Henry James and Warren Murrel. Their subsequent touring schedule took in the Ramblin' Man Fair in the UK alongside headliners Foreigner, and the Keeping The Blues Alive at Sea Mediterranean Blues Cruise in the company of Joe Bonamassa, Peter Frampton, Eric Gales, and Robert Randolph and the Family Band. Their next album, Last Light on the Highway, was released on May 8, 2020. The album featured backing singers Mahalia Barnes, Jade MacRae and Juanita Tippins. "Tired Of Drinking Alone" was one of 11 self-penned tracks making up the collection. The release warranted a favorable mention in Rolling Stone, and the single release from the album, "Oh Miss Carolina", had a three month tenure on Planet Rock Radio in the UK. By this stage the band membership had settled as Robert Jon Burrison (lead vocals/guitar), Andrew Espantman (drums/background vocals), Steve Maggiora (keyboards/background vocals), Henry James (lead guitar), and Warren Murrel (bass guitar). Their next studio album was Shine a Light on Me Brother, which was released on September 3, 2021. It received critical acclaim. One reviewer commented "Shine A Light On Me Brother is Robert Jon and the Wreck's best album to date which is saying a lot. It's a great album from start to finish". Touring commitments throughout 2021 took in parts of Europe, including at Bospop in Weert, Netherlands, the UK in May, plus Australian and Japanese dates. Wreckage Vol. 2 (2022), was a compilation album covering in-studio and live performances recorded between 2020 and 2022. On November 4, 2022, the band announced via Instagram that Maggiora had left the band, due to his duties as a member of the Toto touring band. On April 16, 2023, the band stated that Jake Abernathie, who had played with the ensemble already during several gigs, is the successor of Maggiora.

The band finished a major US touring schedule and toured the UK and Europe in 2023.

== Band members ==
- Robert Jon Burrison – Lead vocals, guitar
- Andrew Espantman – Drums, backing vocals (since 2011)
- Warren Murrel – Bass guitar (since 2017)
- Henry James Schneekluth – Lead guitar, vocals (since 2017)
- Jake Abernathie – Keyboards (since 2023)

Former

- David Pelusi – Bass guitar, vocals
- Kristopher Butcher – Lead guitar, vocals
- Kyle Michael Neal – Lead guitar, backing vocals
- Steve Maggiora – Keyboards, vocals
- Nick Phakpiseth – Bass guitar
- Derrick Wong - Bass guitar

== Discography ==
=== Studio albums ===
| Title | Album details |
|---|---|
| Fire Started | Released: September 2, 2011; Label: Self-released; Format: Digital download |
| Glory Bound | Released: February 24, 2015; Label: Spitifire Music; Format: CD, vinyl, digital download |
| Good Life Pie | Released: May 20, 2016; Label: Spitfire Music; Format: CD, vinyl, digital download, streaming |
| Robert Jon & the Wreck | Released: April 27, 2018; Label: Self-released; Format: CD, vinyl, digital download, streaming |
| Take Me Higher | Released: May 11, 2019; Label: Self-released; Format: CD, vinyl, digital download, streaming |
| Last Light on the Highway | Released: May 8, 2020; Label: Self-released; Format: CD, vinyl, digital download, streaming |
| Shine a Light on Me Brother | Released: September 3, 2021; Label: Self-released; Format: CD, digital download, streaming |
| Ride into the Light | Released: August 4, 2023; Label: Journeyman Records; Format: CD, vinyl, digital download, streaming |
| Red Moon Rising | Release: June 28, 2024; Label: Journeyman Records; Format: CD, vinyl, digital download, streaming |
| Heartbreaks & Last Goodbyes | Released: August 22, 2025; Label: Journeyman Records; Format: CD, vinyl, digital download, streaming |

==== Compilations ====
| Title | Album details |
|---|---|
| Wreckage, Vol. 1 (B-Sides Collection) | Released: August 9, 2017; Label: Self-released; Format: Digital download, streaming |

==== Live albums ====
| Title | Album details |
|---|---|
| Live From Hawaii | Released: September 25, 2020; Label: Hampton Productions; Format: CD, digital download, streaming |
| Wreckage, Vol. 2 (Live) | Released: September 30, 2022; Label: Keeping the Blues Alive Records; Format: CD, digital download, streaming |
| Live at the Ancienne Belgique | Released: April 21, 2023; Label: Journeyman Records; Format: CD, vinyl, digital download, streaming |

=== Extended plays ===
| Title | Album details |
|---|---|
| Rhythm of the Road | Released: June 8, 2013; Label: Self-released; Format: Digital download |
| The Red Bull Sessions | Released: July 4, 2014; Label: Spitfire Music; Format: Digital download |

=== Singles ===
| Title | Year | Album |
|---|---|---|
| "Blame It on the Whiskey" | 2014 | Glory Bound |
| "Take Me Higher" | 2019 | Take Me Higher |
| "Oh Miss Carolina" | 2020 | Last Light on the Highway |
| "Tired of Drinking Alone" | 2020 | Last Light on the Highway |
| "Shine a Light on Me Brother" | 2021 | Shine a Light on Me Brother |
| "Waiting for Your Man" | 2022 | Non-album singles |
| "She's a Fighter" | 2022 | Non-album singles |
| "Pain No More" | 2022 | Ride into the Light |
| "Who Can You Love" | 2022 | Ride into the Light |
| "Come at Me" | 2022 | Ride into the Light |
| "One of a Kind" | 2022 | Ride into the Light |
| "Bring Me Back Home Again" | 2023 | Ride into the Light |
| "West Coast Eyes" | 2023 | Ride into the Light |
| "Don't Look Back Down" | 2023 | Ride into the Light |
| "Stone Cold Killer" | 2023 | Red Moon Rising |
| "Hold On" | 2023 | Red Moon Rising |
| "Help Yourself" | 2023 | Red Moon Rising |
| "Ballad of a Broken Hearted Man" | 2024 | Red Moon Rising |
| "Red Moon Rising" | 2024 | Red Moon Rising |
| "Dragging Me Down" | 2024 | Red Moon Rising |
| "Trouble" | 2024 | Red Moon Rising |

=== Music videos ===
| Year | Title | Album |
|---|---|---|
| "Take Me Higher" | 2019 | Take Me Higher |
| "Oh Miss Carolina" | 2020 | Last Light on the Highway |
| "Tired of Drinking Alone" | 2020 | Shine a Light on Me Brother |
| "Shine a Light on Me Brother" | 2021 | Shine a Light on Me Brother |
| "Waiting for Your Man" | 2022 | —N/a |
| "She's a Fighter" | 2022 | —N/a |
| "Pain No More" | 2022 | Ride into the Light |
| "Who Can You Love" | 2022 | Ride into the Light |
| "One of a Kind" | 2023 | Ride into the Light |
| "Come at Me" | 2023 | Ride into the Light |
| "Bringing Me Back Home Again" | 2023 | Ride into the Light |
| "West Coast Eyes" | 2023 | Ride into the Light |
| "Don't Look Down" | 2023 | Ride into the Light |
| "Ride into the Light" | 2023 | Ride into the Light |
| "Stone Cold Killer" | 2023 | Red Moon Rising |
| "Hold On" | 2023 | Red Moon Rising |
| "Help Yourself" | 2023 | Red Moon Rising |
| "Ballad of a Broken Hearted Man" | 2024 | Red Moon Rising |
| "Red Moon Rising" | 2024 | Red Moon Rising |
| "Dragging Me Down" | 2024 | Red Moon Rising |
| "Trouble" | 2024 | Red Moon Rising |
| "Down No More" | 2024 | Red Moon Rising |
| "Hate to See You Go" | 2024 | Red Moon Rising |
| "Rager" | 2024 | Red Moon Rising |
| "Life Between the Lines" | 2024 | Red Moon Rising |
| "Boss Man" | 2024 | Red Moon Rising |
| "Ashes In the Snow" | 2025 | Heartbreaks and Last Goodbyes |
| "Sittin Pretty" | 2025 | Heartbreaks and Last Goodbyes |
| "Long Gone" | 2025 | Heartbreaks and Last Goodbyes |
| "Highway" | 2025 | Heartbreaks and Last Goodbyes |
| "Better of Me" | 2025 | Heartbreaks and Last Goodbyes |
| "Dark Angel" | 2025 | Heartbreaks and Last Goodbyes |
| "Keep Myself Clean" | 2025 | Heartbreaks and Last Goodbyes |
| "I Wanna Give It" | 2025 | Heartbreaks and Last Goodbyes |
| "Heartbreak and Last Goodbye" | 2025 | Heartbreaks and Last Goodbyes |
| "Old Man" | 2025 | Heartbreaks and Last Goodbyes |
| "Back to the Beginning Again" | 2025 | Unreleased album |
| "Put Your Money Where Your Mouth Is" | 2026 | Unreleased album |
