= Summit County Courthouse (Ohio) =

Local government building in the United States

- Summit County Courthouse and Annex
- U.S. National Register of Historic Places
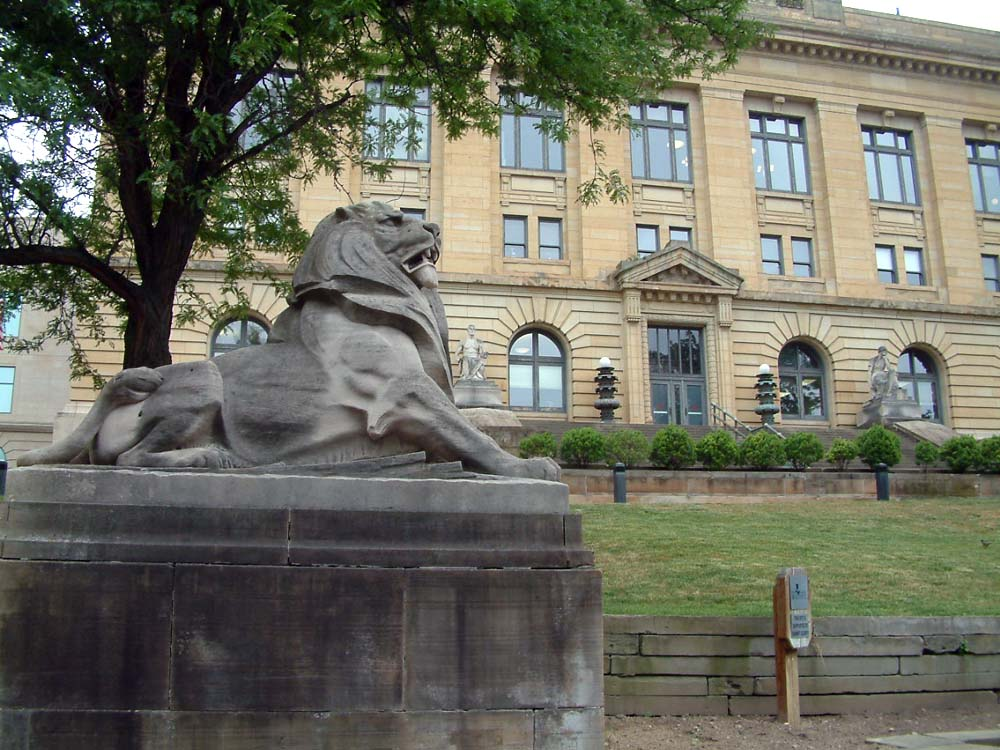

- Location within Ohio Location within the United States
- Location: 209 S. High St., Akron, Ohio
- Coordinates: 41°4′46.4″N 81°31′1.6″W
- Area: 2 acres (0.81 ha)
- Built: 1908
- Architect: J. Milton Dyer
- Architectural style: Second Renaissance Revival
- NRHP reference No.: 74001625
- Added to NRHP: October 15, 1974

Summit County Courthouse, (1905-1908) located at 209 South High Street, Akron, Ohio was designed in the Second Renaissance Style by Cleveland architect J. Milton Dyer. The seated figures of Justice and Law were created by Cleveland sculptor Herman Matzen. Two powerful lions guard the South High Street side of the building.

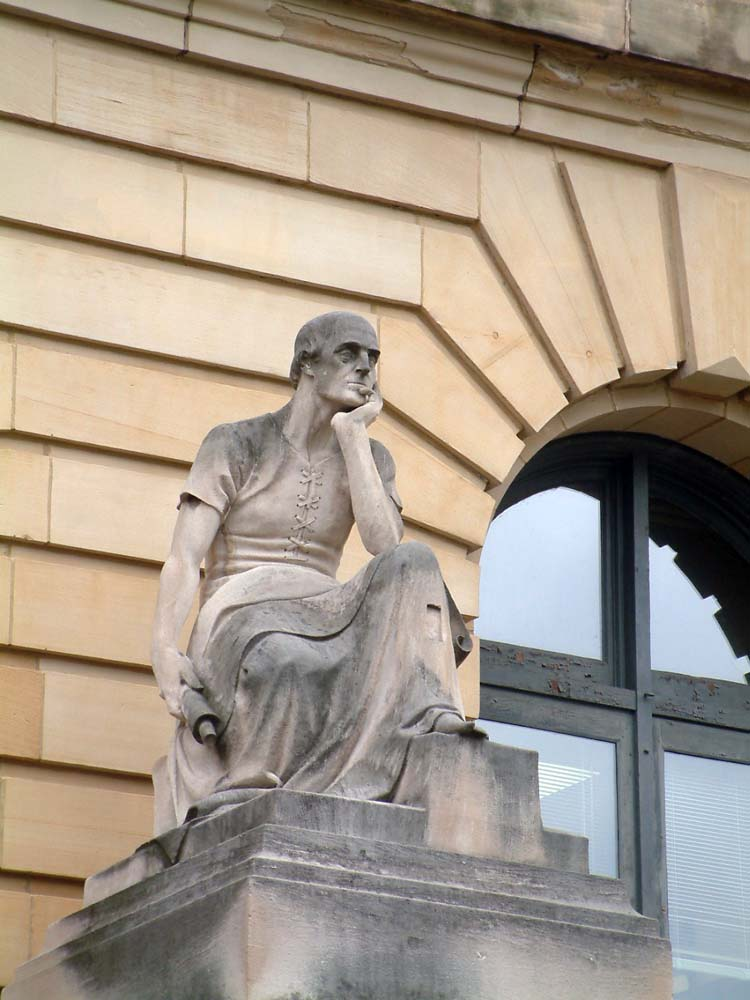
Law

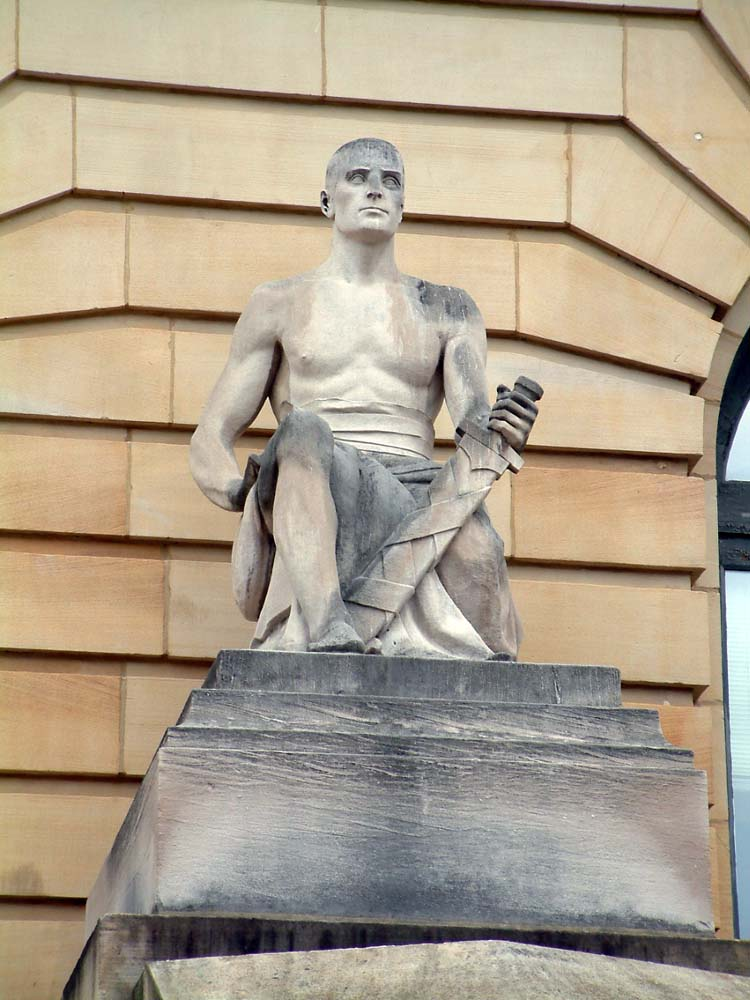
Justice

Dyer, a well known Cleveland, Ohio architect also worked with Cleveland sculptor Matzen again on the Lake County Courthouse, located in Painesville, Ohio, 1909.

The courthouse was added to the National Register of Historic Places in 1974.
