= Brian J. Frederick =

American cultural and queer criminologist

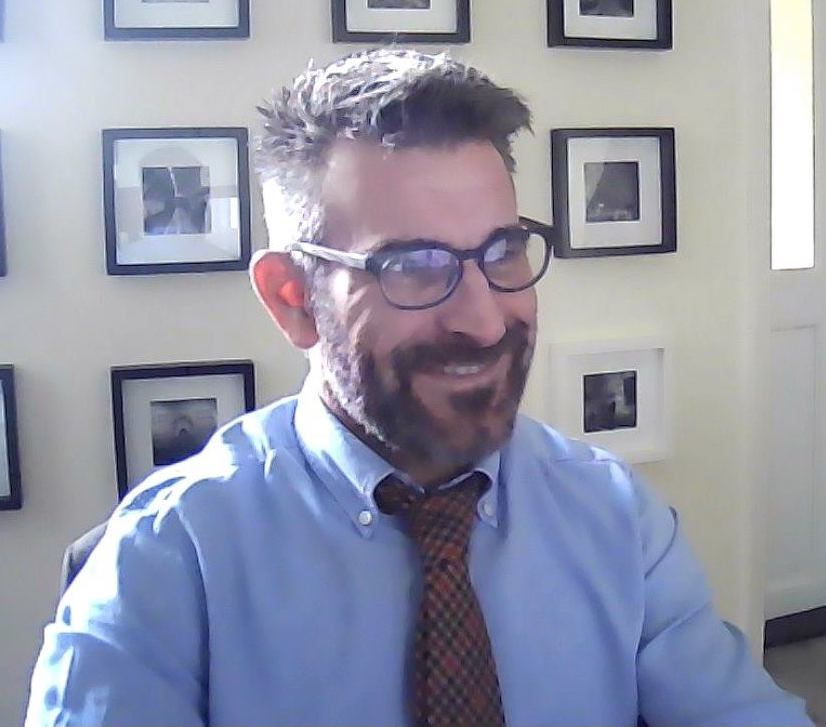
Dr. Brian J. Frederick (Cultural-Global-Queer Criminologist)

Brian J. Frederick is a queer criminologist.They currently serve as an assistant professor of criminal justice at SUNY Empire State College in Brooklyn.

== Education and research interests ==
In 2016, Frederick completed an Erasmus Mundus Joint Doctorate in Global and Cultural Criminology program at the School of Social Policy, Sociology & Social Research at the University of Kent (Canterbury, England) and the Institute für Kriminologische Sozialforschung at University of Hamburg (Hamburg, Germany).

Their research focuses on how the ongoing commercialization, commodification and gentrification of queer physical space (i.e., ‘gay ghettos’) and queer virtual space affects sexual experiences among gay, bisexual and queer men (GBQM). Their research also looks at the impact of criminal justice and public health interventions, as well as the stigmatisation, marginalisation and oppression of GBQM by contemporary gay culture.

Several areas in which Frederick is actively researching include:

- Intimate partner violence and intimate partner homicide in same-sex relationships, including where transgender individuals are victims
- Serial murder involving gay, bisexual and queer male victims and perpetrators
- Queer male drug use
- Critical criminological pedagogy

== Publications ==
- Frederick, Brian Jay (in print). Mediated representations of queer male drug use. Salud & Sociedad.
- Suguira, L., Button, M., Tapley, J. Blackbourn, D, Frederick, B.J. & Hawkins, C.D. Computer misuse as a facilitator of domestic abuse. U.K. Home Office
- Frederick, Brian Jay (2016). Exploring the (Sub)Cultural Aspects of Gay, Bisexual and Queer Male Drug Use in Cyberspace. Doctor of Philosophy [PhD] Thesis. University of Kent, University of Hamburg.
- Thanki, D. & Frederick, B. (2016). 'Social media and drug markets', The internet and drug markets (European Monitoring Centre for Drugs and Drug Addiction: Insights 21), Publications Office of the European Union, Luxembourg.
- Frederick, B.J. & Gil Larruscahim, P. (2016). Cultural criminology. In W.G. Jennings [Ed.] The Wiley Encyclopedia of Crime & Punishment (p. 1). Hoboken, NJ: John Wiley & Sons.
- Frederick, B.J. & Perrone, D. (2014). "'Party N Play' on the Internet: Subcultural formation, Craigslist, and escaping from stigma." Deviant Behavior 35: 859–884.
- Frederick, B.J. (2013). "Delinquent boys": Toward a new understanding of "deviant" and transgressive behavior in gay men. Critical Criminology, 21(4):10.1007/s10612-013-9230-3
- Frederick, B. J. (2012). The marginalization of critical perspectives in public criminal justice core curricula. Western Criminological Review, 13(3), 21-33.
- The Risks of Using Gay & MSM "Hookup" Technologies
- Frederick, B., & Fradella, H. (2012). Leopold and Loeb. In Wilbur R. Miller (Ed.), The social history of crime and punishment in America: An encyclopedia. (pp. 1005-1006). Thousand Oaks, CA: SAGE Publications, Inc. doi: 10.4135/9781452218427.n394
