= Reynold Hinsdale =

American architect

Reynold Henry Hinsdale (July 15, 1879 – November 6, 1934) was an American architect.

== Biography ==
Hinsdale was born and educated in Utica, New York and received his architectural training at the New York School of Art. He was associated with the firm of Clinton & Russell in New York City before coming to Cleveland about 1904. He is believed to have worked with J. Milton Dyer and established his own office in Cleveland in the Erie Building. He was a member of the American Institute of Architects.

Hinsdale lived at 2924 Corydon Road in Cleveland Heights. He died in Lakeside Hospital and is buried in Knollwood Cemetery.

== Projects ==
- Series of homes on the 9200 Kempton block (1912) in Cleveland, Ohio
- Gebauer Chemical Company (1918) in Cleveland, Ohio
- Residence (1922) 2950 Attleboro Road Shaker Heights, Ohio
- Ardleigh Drive home Euclid Golf Allotment
- Park Lane Villa (1922–1923) 10518 Park Lane in Cleveland, Ohio
- Apartment building 8024 Detroit Avenue (1925) for Joseph Baskin in Cleveland
- Grace Evangelical Lutheran Church 146 High Street Wadsworth, Ohio
- Feinway Apartments in Cleveland
