= Archwood Avenue Historic District =

Historic district in Ohio, United States

- U.S. National Register of Historic Places
- U.S. Historic district
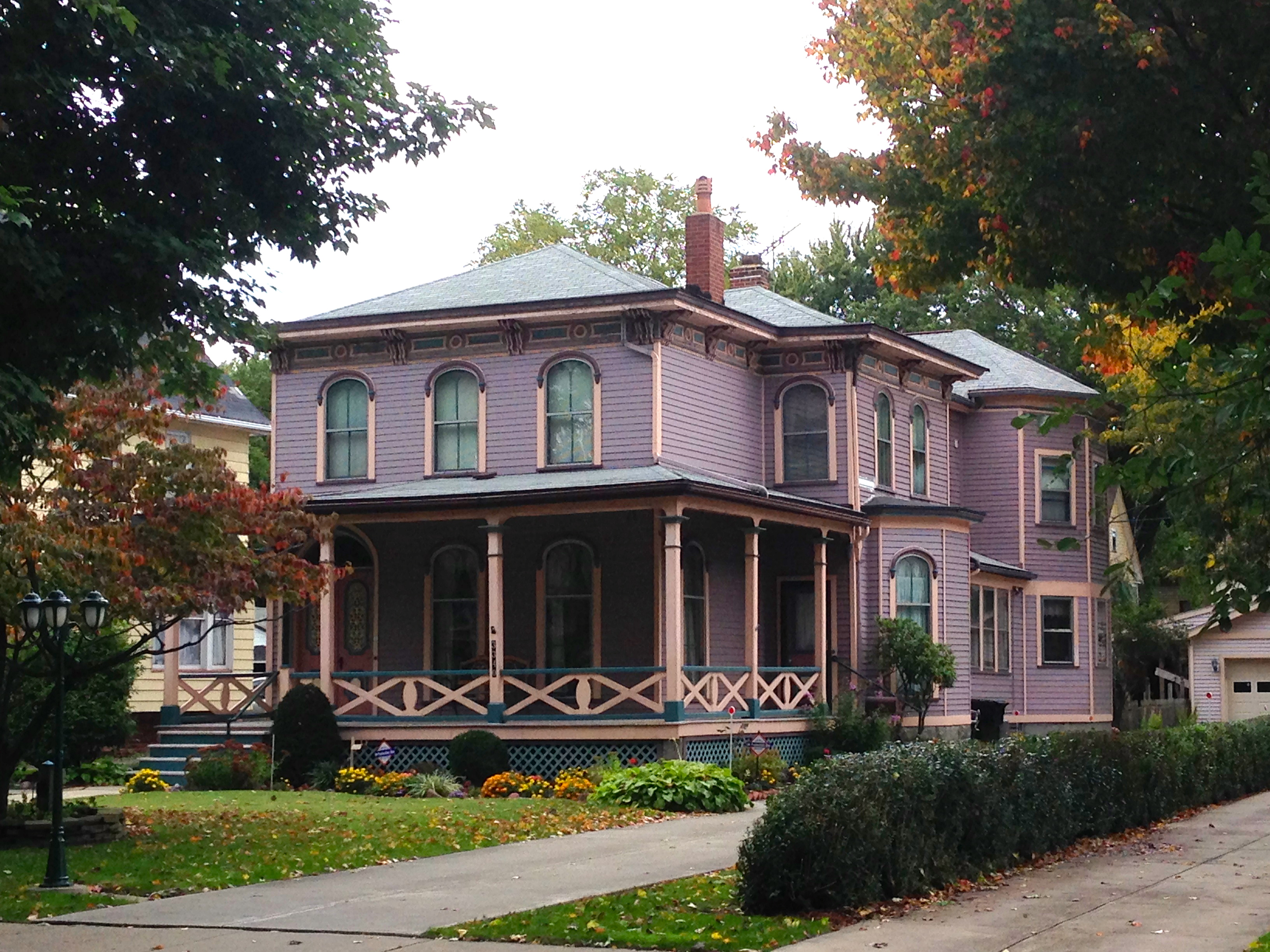
- The Oscar Kroehle House

- Location within Cleveland Location within Ohio Location within the United States
- Location: Archwood Ave. roughly bounded by W. Thirty-first Pl. and W. Thirty-seventh St., Cleveland, Ohio
- Coordinates: 41°27′10″N 81°42′25″W
- Area: 13 acres (5.3 ha)
- Architectural style: Colonial Revival, Italianate, Queen Anne
- MPS: Brooklyn Centre MRA
- NRHP reference No.: 87000428
- Added to NRHP: March 19, 1987

The Archwood Avenue Historic District is a historic residential district in the Brooklyn Centre neighborhood of Cleveland, Ohio, United States. Composed of houses constructed around the turn of the twentieth century, it has been one of the neighborhood's most important streets since it was established, and it was designated a historic district in 1987.

When the Village of Brooklyn was first platted, Archwood Avenue (originally Greenwood St) was included as one of the village's side streets. Lots along Archwood were larger than those along other streets, and the street itself was atypically wide, so the village's largest original houses were built along the street. The Village of Brooklyn was annexed as Cleveland's Old Brooklyn neighborhood in 1894, Archwood retained its significant place in the neighborhood. The street's built environment is variable: late nineteenth-century styles such as Colonial Revival, Italianate, and Queen Anne are all found in the district.

Rather than being concentrated in separate pockets, the styles are mixed together: in one block, a two-story Italianate house is placed between a two-story Queen Anne and a three-story Queen Anne on a corner lot. Five of the neighborhood's residences, known as the William Coates, Weldon Davis, Oscar Kroehle, Adam Poe, and Charles Selzer Houses, are the premier buildings within the district, while a pair of apartment buildings at the 33rd Street intersection are distinguished by two separate facades with ornamental entrances.

In 1987, Archwood Avenue was designated a historic district and listed on the National Register of Historic Places, due to the integrity of its historic architecture. Covering 13 acres (5.3 ha), the district includes 57 different buildings, all of which qualified for consideration as contributing properties.
