= Jon O'Brien =

English footballer

Personal information
- Full name: Jonathan Mark O'Brien
- Date of birth: 2 November 1961 (age 64)
- Place of birth: Southend-on-Sea, England
- Position: Goalkeeper

Senior career*
Years	Team	Apps	(Gls)
1982–1983	Maldon Town		
1983–1984	Tilbury		
1984–1986	Southend United	11	(0)
- Chelmsford City
1986	Dartford		
1986–1988	Barking		
- Hitchin Town
1988–1991	Wivenhoe Town	59	(0)
- Great Wakering Rovers
1991–1992	Colchester	5	(0)
- * Club domestic league appearances and goals

Jonathan Mark O'Brien (born 2 November 1961) is an English former footballer who played as a goalkeeper.

== Career ==
In 1984, O'Brien signed for hometown club Southend United on non-contract terms, after playing for Maldon Town and Tilbury. After new manager Bobby Moore was appointed Southend manager, O'Brien was invited to train with the first team. On 10 November 1984, O'Brien made his Southend debut in a 2–1 home victory against Peterborough United. Following another ten Football League appearances for Southend, O'Brien dropped back into non-league, playing for Chelmsford City, Dartford, Barking, Hitchin Town, Wivenhoe Town and Great Wakering Rovers.
