= Tavern Club (Cleveland) =

- U.S. National Register of Historic Places
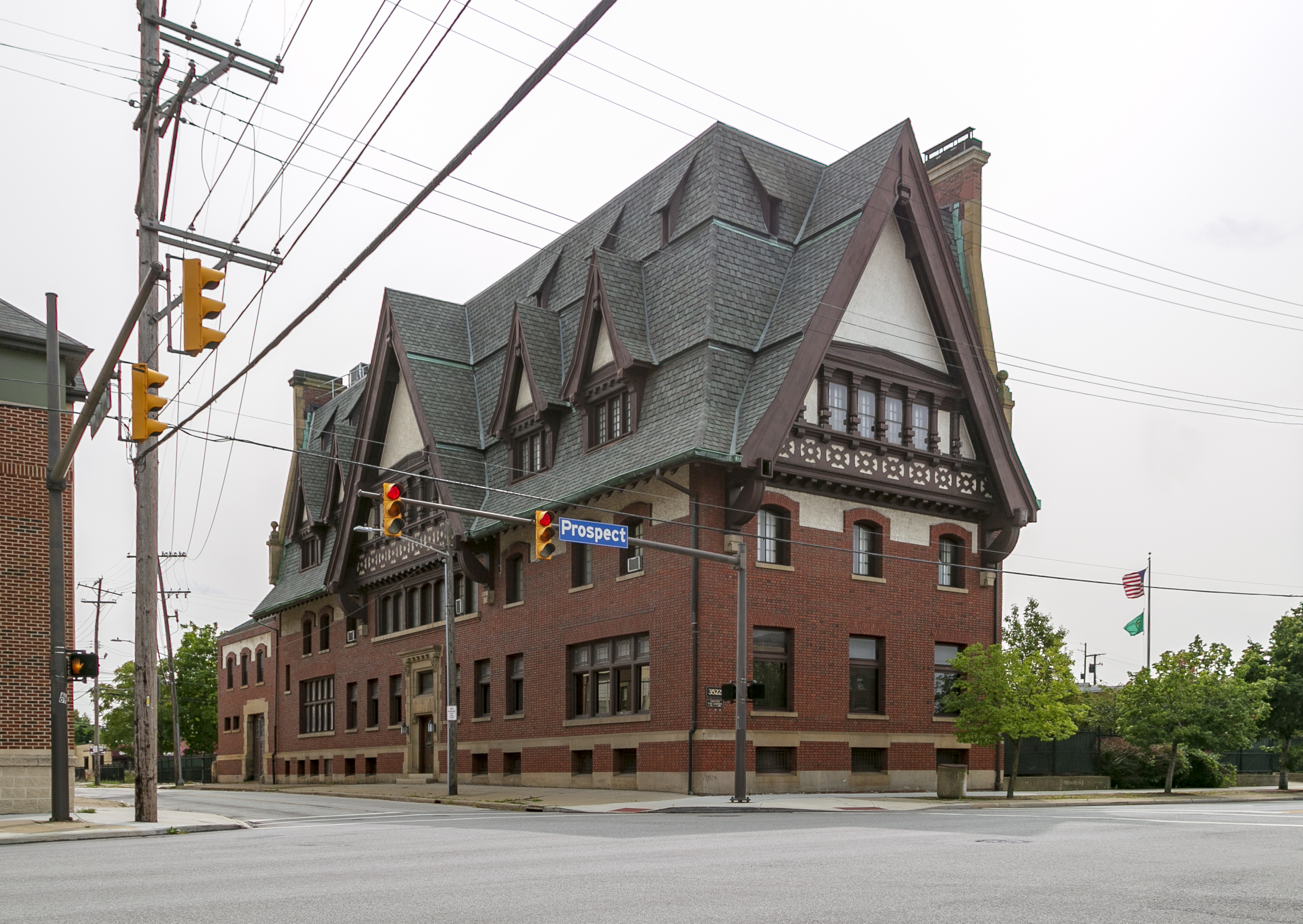
- View from the intersection of Prospect Ave. and E. 36th St.

- Location within Cleveland Location within Ohio Location within the United States
- Location: 3522 Prospect Ave., Cleveland, Ohio
- Coordinates: 41°30′4.9″N 81°39′45.3″W
- Area: less than one acre
- Built: 1905
- Architect: Dyer, J. Milton
- Architectural style: Northern Renaissance
- MPS: Upper Prospect MRA
- NRHP reference No.: 84000235
- Added to NRHP: November 1, 1984

The Tavern Club is a private social club in the Central neighborhood of Cleveland, Ohio, USA. Its home is a building designed by architect J. Milton Dyer in a Northern Renaissance style. It was listed on the National Register of Historic Places in 1984. It was also designated as a landmark by the City of Cleveland. Tavern was built at a time when, just a block away, Cleveland's Millionaire's Row on Euclid Avenue was among the wealthiest neighborhoods in the world, and home to many members.

Dyer was a member of the Tavern Club, which was established 1892–93. He designed a building for the group when it moved from a leased property at 968 Prospect Street to its present building on January 1, 1905. Dyer's design was inspired by his admiration of the clubhouses of the Heidelberg University dueling societies. "The exterior construction and the traditional interior decor of the building" have remained essentially the same since the club's beginning.

The upstairs originally contained two squash courts and a rackets court. The Tavern Club Invitational, a Professional Squash Doubles tournament, benefits the youth empowerment through squash program, Urban Squash Cleveland.

The club's registered name is The Tavern Company, and it is governed under laws for 501(c)(7) Social and Recreation Clubs. In 2024 it claimed total revenue of $823,288 and total assets of $1,496,264.

== See also ==
- List of American gentlemen's clubs
