= Killer Be Killed =

American heavy metal band

- From left to right: former drummer Dave Elitch, Max Cavalera, Greg Puciato, and Troy Sanders

Background information
- Origin: Los Angeles, California, U.S.
- Genres: Groove metal, alternative metal
- Years active: 2011–present
- Label: Nuclear Blast
- Spinoff of: Soulfly; The Dillinger Escape Plan; Mastodon; The Mars Volta; Torche; Converge; All Pigs Must Die
- Members: Greg Puciato; Max Cavalera; Troy Sanders; Ben Koller
- Past members: Dave Elitch
- Website: killerbekilled.com

Killer Be Killed is an American heavy metal supergroup founded by Dillinger Escape Plan vocalist Greg Puciato and Soulfly frontman Max Cavalera in early 2011. The lineup also features Mastodon bassist and co-vocalist Troy Sanders and Converge drummer Ben Koller. The band had slowly been working on material before announcing its name in October 2013, along with their signing to Nuclear Blast. The group's self-titled debut record was released in 2014. In September 2020, the group returned with a new single, and released their second album, Reluctant Hero, in November of that year.

== History ==
=== Formation, early years and self-titled (2011–2015) ===
The band was first announced in February 2011, when Metal Hammer reported news of Puciato and Cavalera planning a new project in the vein of Cavalera's Nailbomb band with Alex Newport in the mid 1990s. Shortly afterwards, The Mars Volta's Dave Elitch and Mastodon bassist Troy Sanders were announced to be part of the project. Converge bassist Nate Newton was originally eyed to be included in the project, but was unable to join, so Cavalera reached out to Sanders instead. Despite not yet having a name, the group entered the Fortress Studio in Los Angeles in September 2013 with producer Josh Wilbur.

In October 2013, the band revealed Killer Be Killed as their name and announced that their first album would be released through Nuclear Blast. In March 2014, an announcement confirmed that the band's debut album would be self-titled, Killer Be Killed, and would be released on May 13, 2014. On March 14, 2014, two songs from the upcoming eponymous debut, "Wings of Feather and Wax", and "Face Down" were made available for streaming.

Converge drummer Ben Koller joined for the band's live debut at Soundwave Festival and was announced as a full-fledged member that summer, replacing Elitch.

=== Reluctant Hero (2016–present) ===
In an interview with Full Metal Jackie, Cavalera said, "I'd love to do a little bit with Killer Be Killed … We did one record and it was very well received, and I think we can do a better one than that. I think we can really — if we work hard on it — we can make a kick ass second Killer Be Killed album." In a 2016 Facebook update Koller announced there is "whispers in the dark of a new Killer Be Killed album". In April 2018, Max Cavalera confirmed that the band were convening in Phoenix to write and rehearse new material in Soulfly's rehearsal space, with the aim of releasing a new album in 2019.

On Friday, September 4, 2020, the band released a brand new song called "Deconstructing Self-Destruction" which features Max, Greg, Troy and Ben credited as writers. The song is the first single off their second album, Reluctant Hero, which is set for release on November 20, 2020, via Nuclear Blast Records. Wall of Sound broke the news after digging up the album's artwork and tracklisting.

On October 9, 2020, the band released their second single from the album called "Dream Gone Bad".

In an interview with Wall of Sound, bassist Troy Sanders explained why the second album's recording process was kept a secret: "I mentioned to my guys 'every time we get together and work on something, let's just keep it to ourselves' so we don't create any type of buzz or excitement to our small handful of fans." Reluctant Hero was released in November 20, 2020.

== Musical style ==
Commenting on the writing process of their first album, Cavalera told Decibel that the record will be "politically charged" and that the composition will be a merging of styles of each of its members. In a press release, Puciato characterizes the style, "It's a bit of Sabbath-y doom, a bit of thrash, a bit of hardcore and punk" continuing, "Of any of our bands, it sounds the furthest away from mine...", whereas critics have described the band's sound as a progressive form of groove metal, incorporating elements of melodic metalcore, hardcore punk, crossover thrash and progressive rock.

== Members ==
Current members

- Greg Puciato – vocals, rhythm guitar (2011–present)
- Max Cavalera – vocals, rhythm guitar (2011–present)
- Troy Sanders – bass, vocals (2012–present)
- Ben Koller – drums, percussion (2015–present)

Live/session members

- Juan Montoya – lead guitar (2013, 2015, 2020–present)

Former members

- Dave Elitch – drums, percussion (2012–2015)

Timeline

== Discography ==
=== Studio albums ===
Title	Album details	Peak chart positions							Sales
Title	Album details	US	AUS	BEL	GER	JPN	SWI	UK	Sales
Killer Be Killed	Released: May 9, 2014; Label: Nuclear Blast; Formats: CD, DL	58	47	113	90	192	91	71	US: 5,500+
Reluctant Hero	Released: November 20, 2020; Label: Nuclear Blast	—	45	—	52	—	69	—	

=== Singles and music videos ===
Year	Title	Director	Album
2014	"Wings of Feather and Wax"	Thomas Mignone	Killer Be Killed
2014	"Snakes of Jehovah"	Thomas Mignone	Killer Be Killed
2015	"Curb Crusher"	Neal Walters	Killer Be Killed
2020	"Dream Gone Bad"	Jim Louvau & Tony Aguilera	Reluctant Hero
2020	"Inner Calm from Outer Storms"	Jim Louvau & Tony Aguilera	Reluctant Hero
2020	"From a Crowded Wound"	Costin Chioreanu	Reluctant Hero

== Accolades ==
Metal Hammer Golden Gods Awards

Year	Nominee / work	Award	Result
2015	Killer Be Killed	Best Live Band	Nominated
