= Herman Matzen =

American sculptor

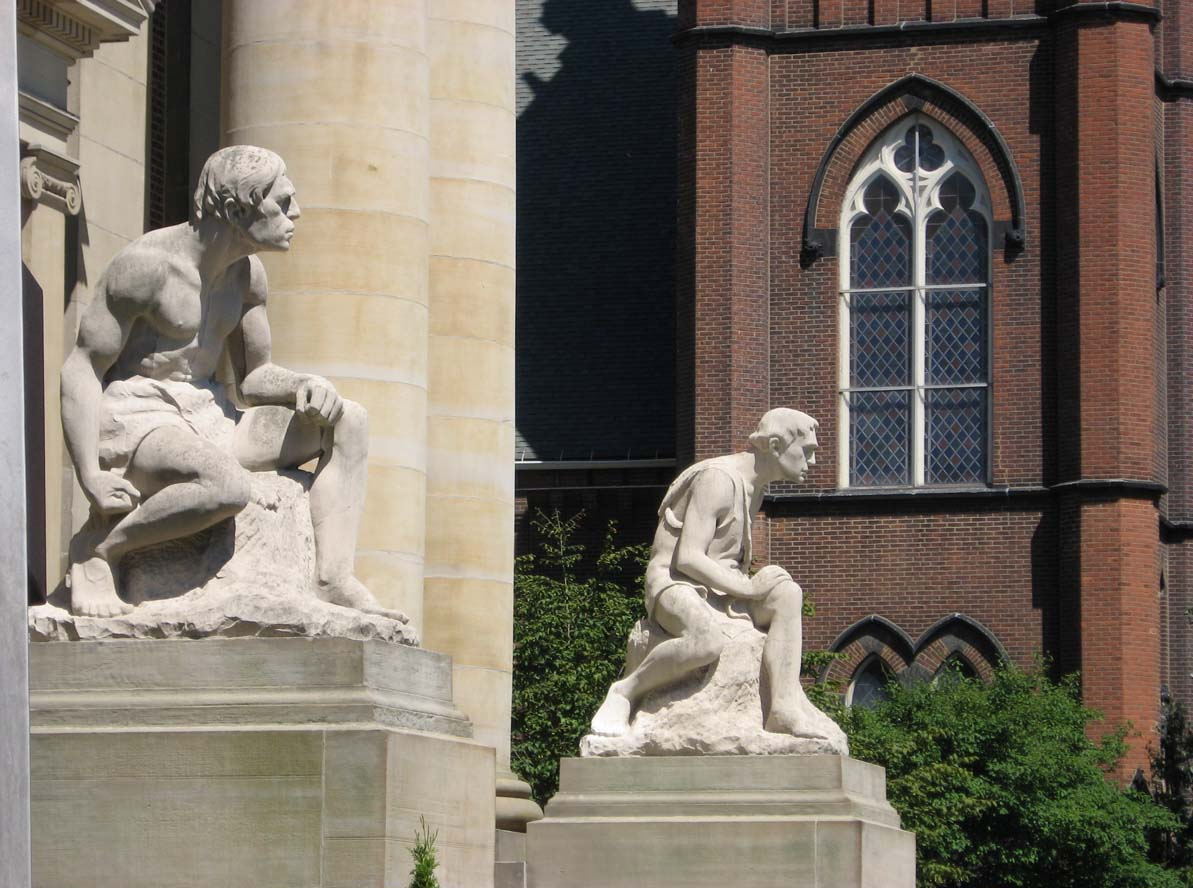
Cain and Abel, Lake County Courthouse, Painesville, Ohio

Herman Matzen (July 15, 1861 – April 22, 1938) was an American sculptor and educator, born in Denmark.

== Early years ==
Matzen studied at the Academy of Fine Arts in Munich and the Academy of Fine Arts in Berlin before immigrating to the United States. After moving first to Detroit he ultimately settled in Cleveland.

== Selected works ==
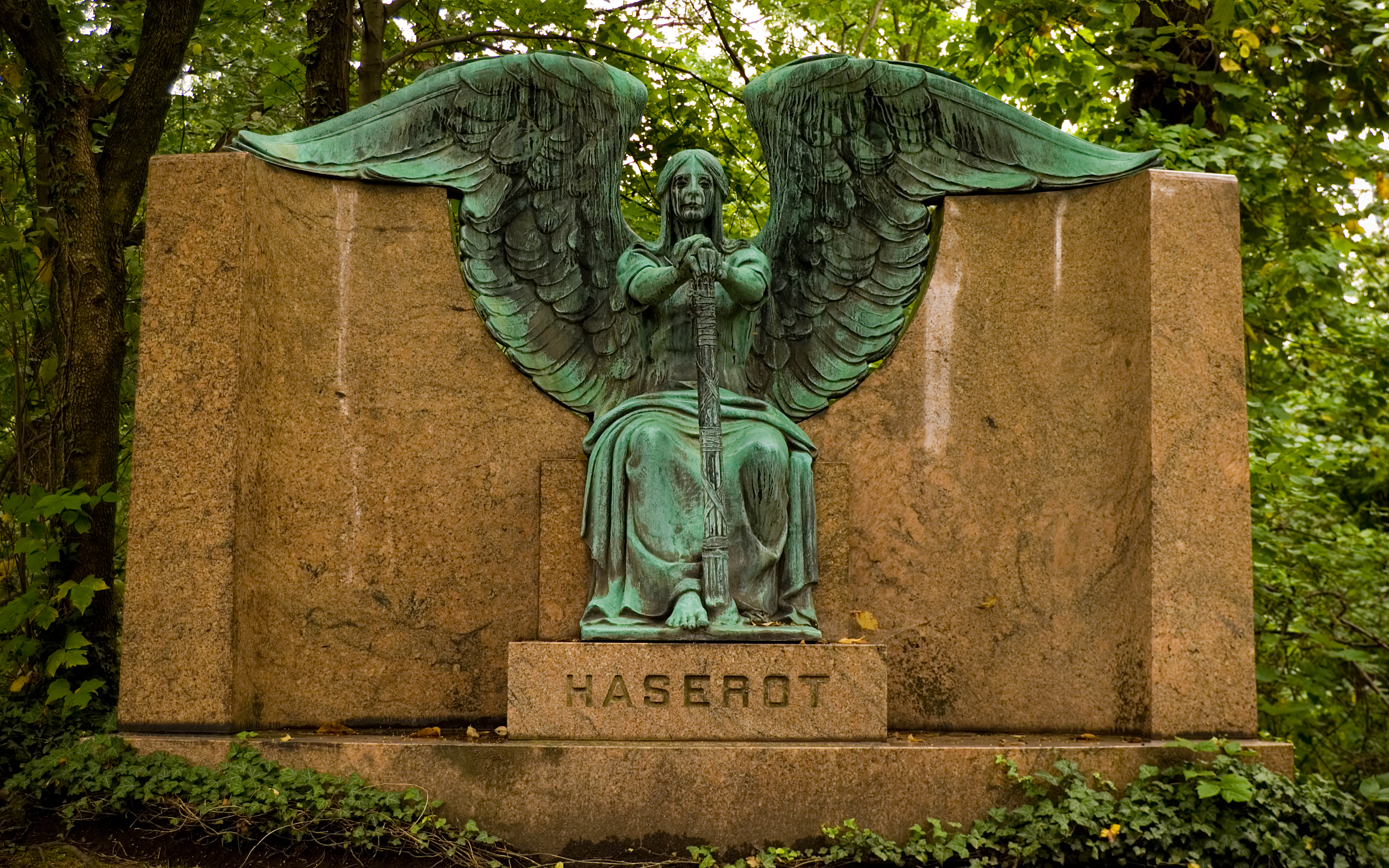
Angel of Death Victorious

- Justice and Law, Summit County Courthouse, Akron, Ohio, 1908
- Monumental statues of Cain and Abel at the Lake County Court House, Painesville, Ohio, 1909
- Commodore Oliver Hazard Perry Monument, with William Walcutt, Fort Huntington Park, Cleveland, Ohio, 1929
- The Angel of Death Victorious or The Haserot Angel located at the Lake View Cemetery, 1924
- Friedrich von Schiller, Belle Isle Park 1908.

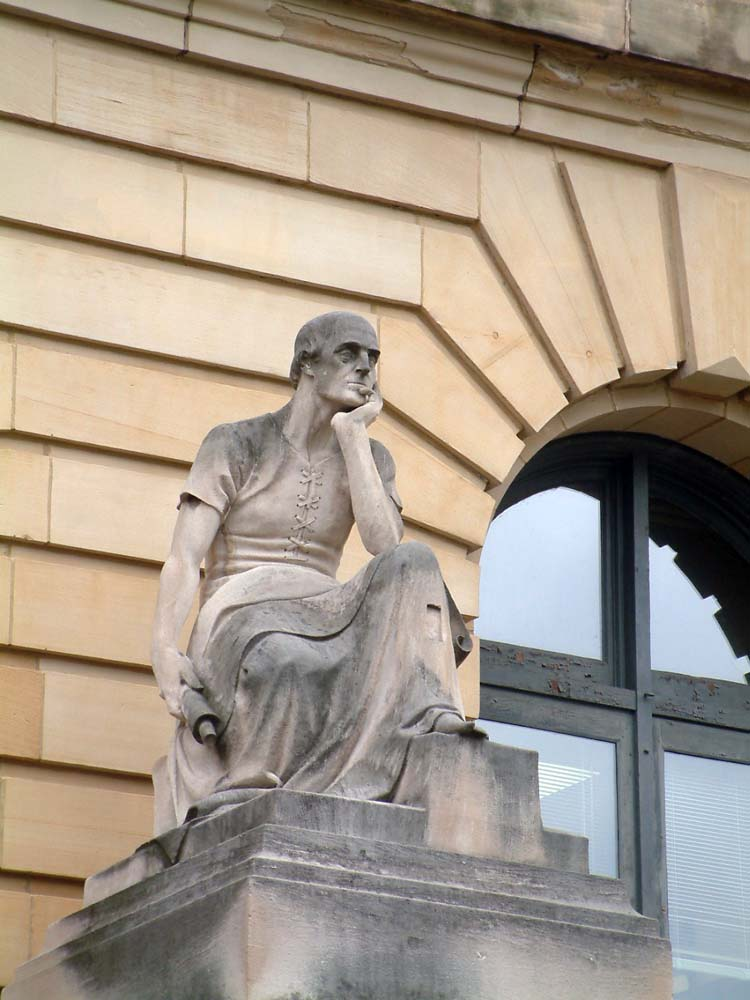
Law, Summit County Courthouse, 1908

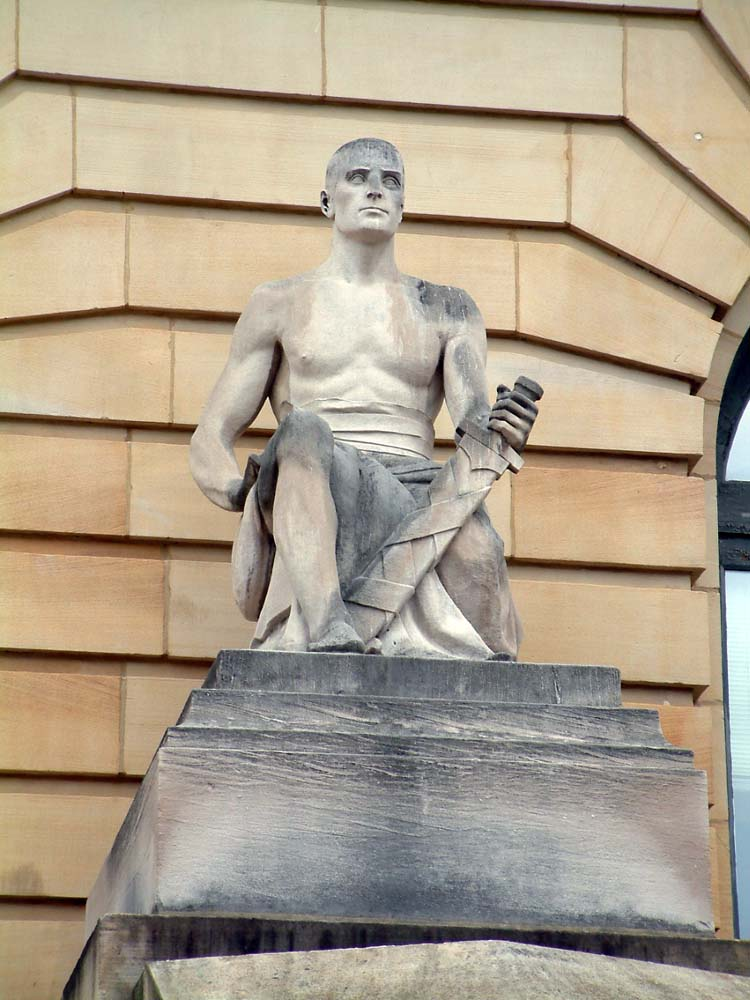
Justice, Summit County Courthouse, 1908
