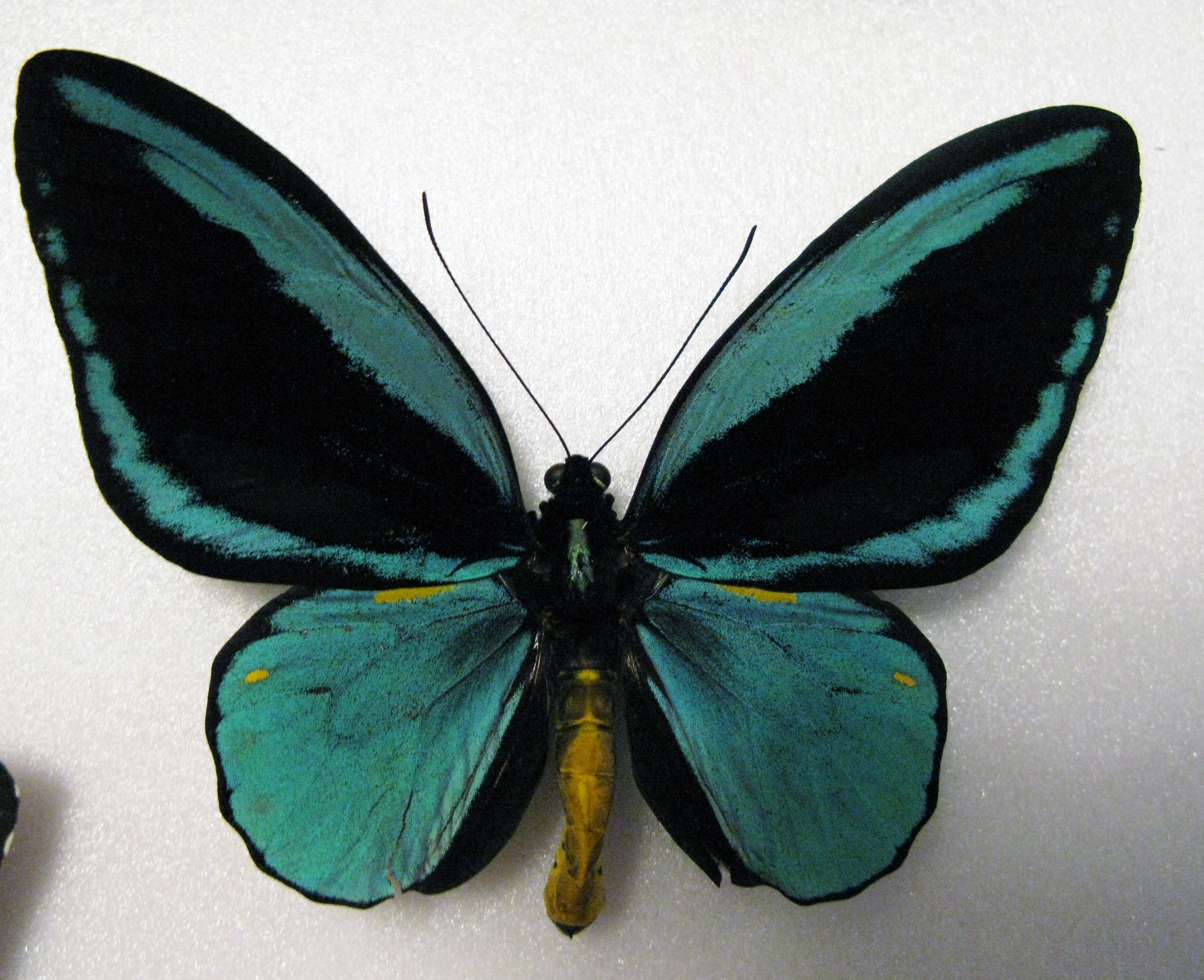
- Male, mounted specimen

Conservation status
- Vulnerable (IUCN 3.1)
- CITES Appendix II

Scientific classification
- Kingdom: Animalia
- Phylum: Arthropoda
- Class: Insecta
- Order: Lepidoptera
- Family: Papilionidae
- Genus: Ornithoptera
- Species: O. aesacus

Binomial name
- Ornithoptera aesacus Ney, 1903

= Ornithoptera aesacus =

Obi Island Birdwing

Species of birdwing butterfly

Ornithoptera aesacus, the Obi Island birdwing, is an extremely rare species of birdwing butterfly, endemic to the Island of Obira (formerly Obi), Indonesia. While being a very rare species, they are commercially bred and traded.

The specific epithet of Ornithoptera aesacus, is named after Æsacus, the eldest son of Priam.

== History ==
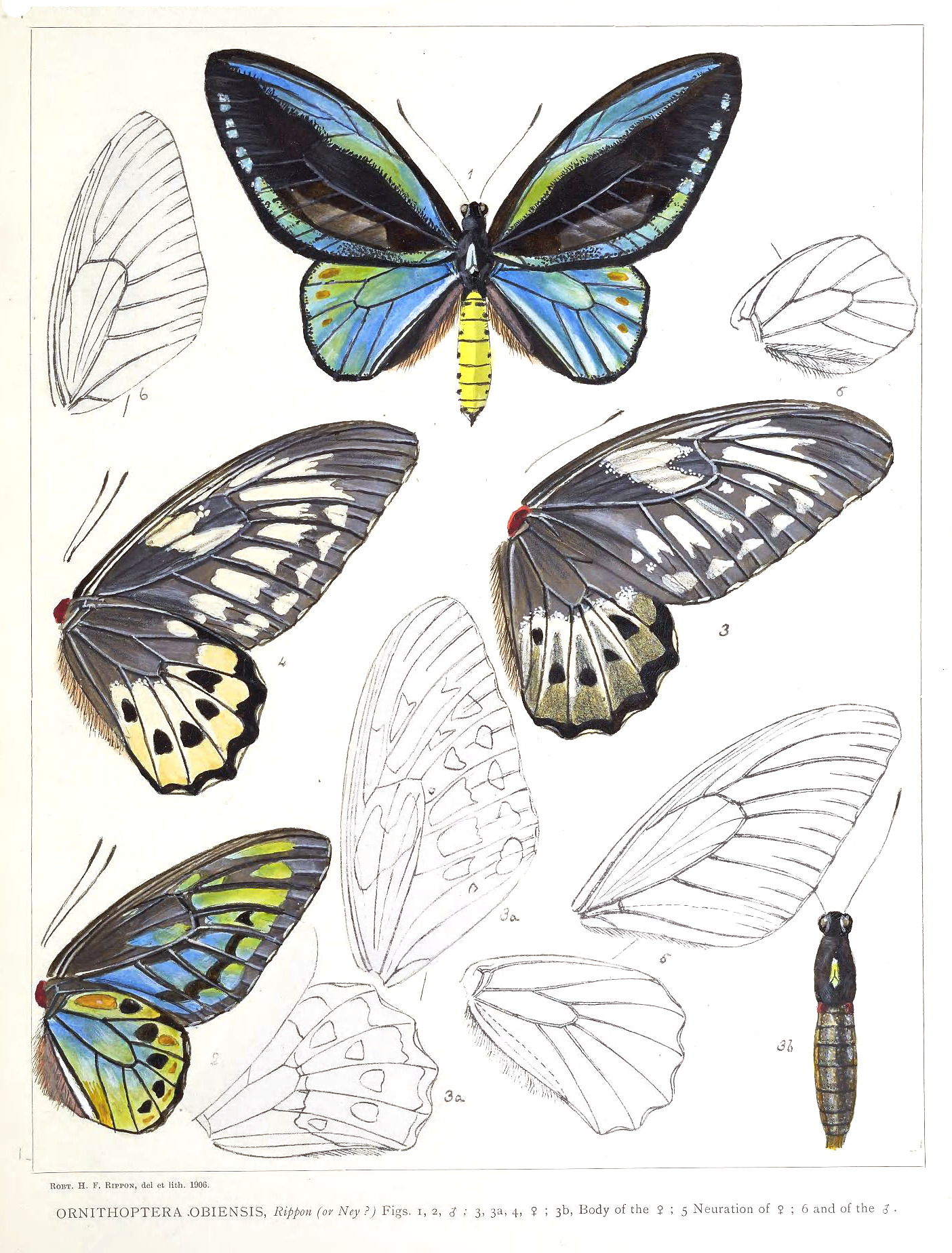
Ornithoptera obiensis in Robert Henry Fernando Rippon Icones Ornithopterorum (1898 to 1906)

The original description is: aesacus Ney, F. (Felix) 1903 as Troides priamus Form aesacus. The full reference is Ney, F. 1903 Eine neue Troides-Form von Obi. Insekten-Börse 20 (5): 36., 1903.

The depository of the four syntypes collected by J. Waterstradt in May 1902 is unknown. They were once held by Hermann Rolle, whose collection, in part, was sold to Eugène Le Moult.

== Description ==
Ornithoptera aesacus is a member of the Ornithoptera priamus species group. The two species are very similar but the male O. aesacus has a brilliant turquoise-blue sheen.

== Taxonomy ==
The classification of Ornithoptera aesacus as a species does not have full consensus, and is sometimes regarded as a subspecies of Ornithoptera priamus by some, such as Parsons (1996).

=== Synonymy ===
- O. obiana (Waterstradt in litt.) Rebel, 1906
- O. obiensis Rippon, 1906
- O. obiana (as O. arruana obiana) Rippon, 1906-1912

== Distribution ==
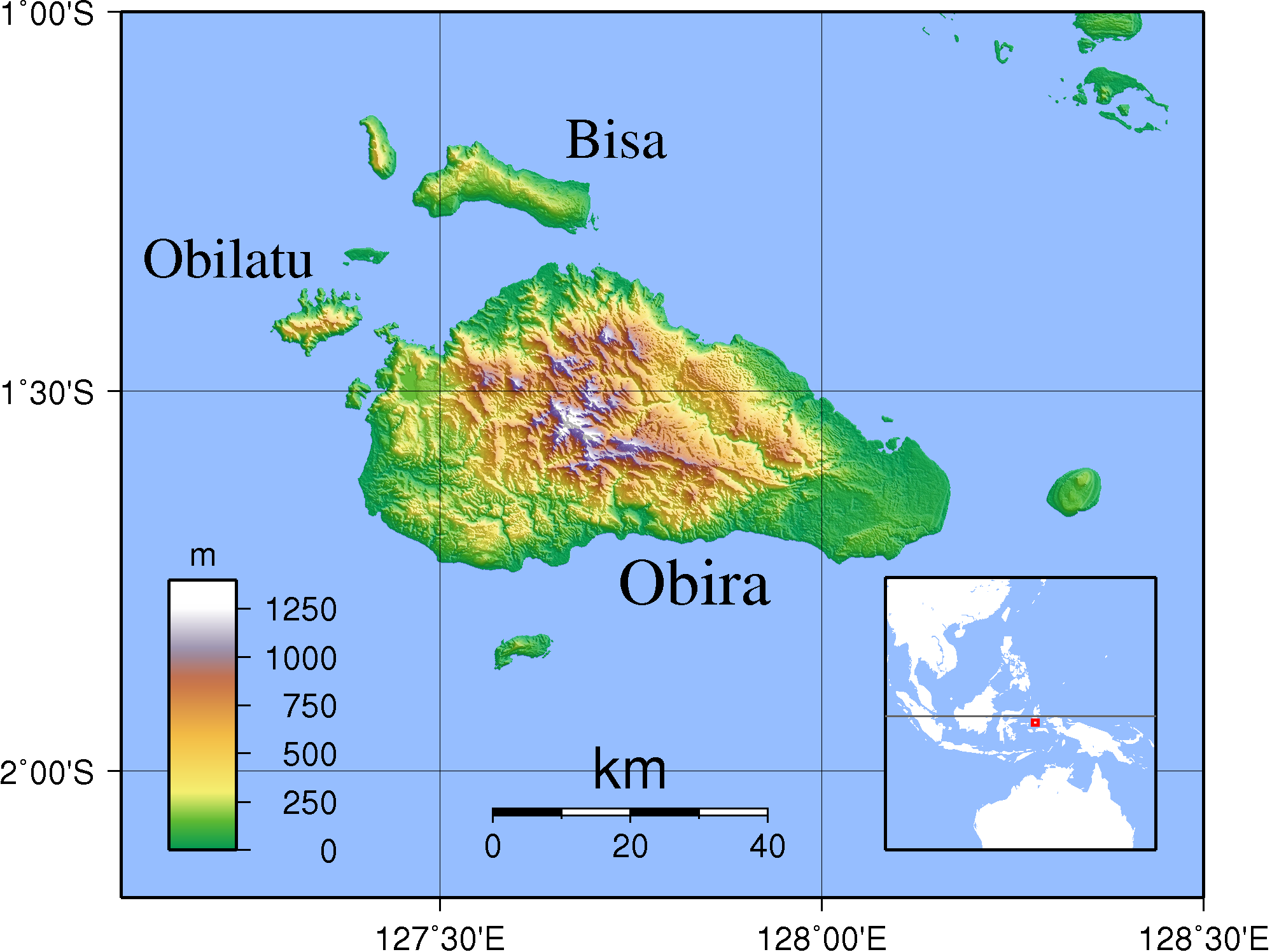
The Obi Islands. Ornithoptera aesacus is known to occur only on Obira

The Obi Island birdwing is endemic to the Island of Obira in Indonesia. It inhabits tropical rainforest. Due to extensive logging on the Island the conservation of the species is a concern, and has been classified as 'Vulnerable' by the IUCN Twenty years ago it was the rarest birdwing species in the world. It remains threatened, but is commercially bred.

== Other sources ==
- D'Abrera, B. (1975). Birdwing Butterflies of the World. Country Life Books, London.
- Collins, N. Mark; Morris, Michael G. (1985). Threatened Swallowtail Butterflies of the World: The IUCN Red Data Book. Gland & Cambridge: IUCN. ISBN 978-2-88032-603-6 – via Biodiversity Heritage Library.
- Haugum, J. & Low, A.M. (1978-1985). A Monograph of the Birdwing Butterflies. 2 volumes. Scandinavian Press, Klampenborg; 663 pp.
- Parsons, M.J. (1996). A phylogenetic reappraisal of the birdwing genus Ornithoptera (Lepidoptera: Papilionidae: Troidini) and a new theory of its evolution in relation to Gondwanan vicariance biogeography. Journal of Natural History 30(11):1707-1736.
