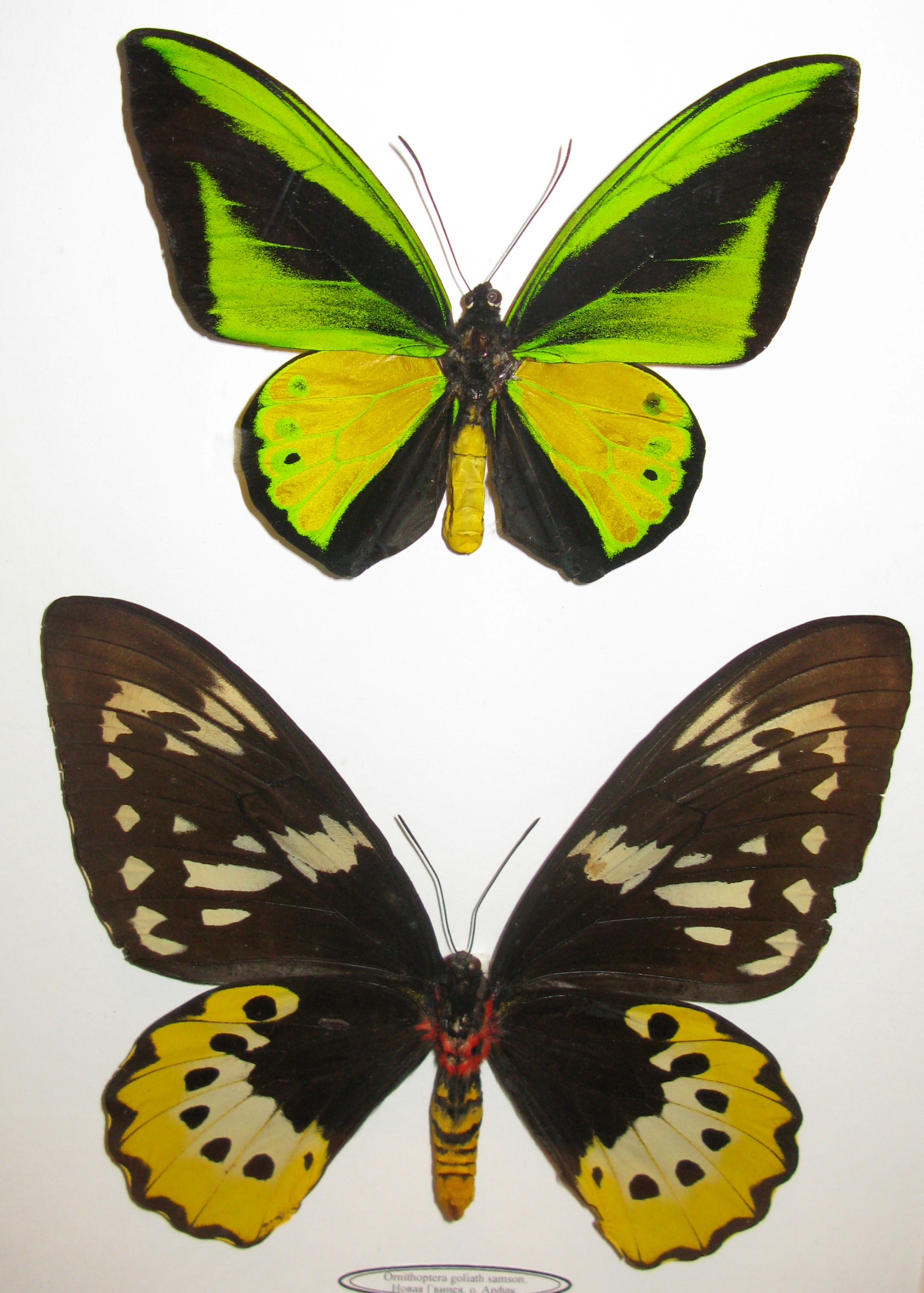
- Male dorsal side above, female ventral side below

Conservation status
- Least Concern (IUCN 3.1)

Scientific classification
- Kingdom: Animalia
- Phylum: Arthropoda
- Clade: Pancrustacea
- Class: Insecta
- Order: Lepidoptera
- Family: Papilionidae
- Genus: Ornithoptera
- Species: O. goliath

Binomial name
- Ornithoptera goliath Oberthür, 1888

= Ornithoptera goliath =

Goliath birdwing

Species of birdwing butterfly

Ornithoptera goliath, the Goliath birdwing, is a birdwing butterfly found in New Guinea. It is the second largest butterfly in the world, after the Queen Alexandra's birdwing.

== Description ==
Ornithoptera goliath is strongly sexually dimorphic, having a wingspan up to 28 centimetres (11 in) in females and up to 17 cm (6.75 in) males. This makes it the world's second largest butterfly. The African giant swallowtail reaches an almost equal wingspan.

Male. The Goliath birdwing's forewings are black. The costal edge is green and beyond the medium black bar is a large green triangle which reaches the dorsum but not the black sternum. The underside is greenish yellow and greenish. The veins are black and there is a black border. The outer cells have small black spots. The hindwings are golden with a black edge bordered basally by a thin green line. There are some green spots in the cells of the golden area. The underside is similar to the upperside, but there is no black border. The edge is green. The spots in the cells of the golden area are black.

The abdomen is yellow with black-edged tergites. The head and thorax are black and the underside of the thorax has tufts of red hair.

Female. The female is larger than the male and the basic colour is dark brown. At the outer edge there is a postdiscal chain of white spots. In the discal] cell there is a cluster of white spots, sometimes shaped like an "E". The hindwings have a broad yellow postdiscal band with a chain of dark-brown spots in the cells. The underside is very like the upper but the colours are stronger.

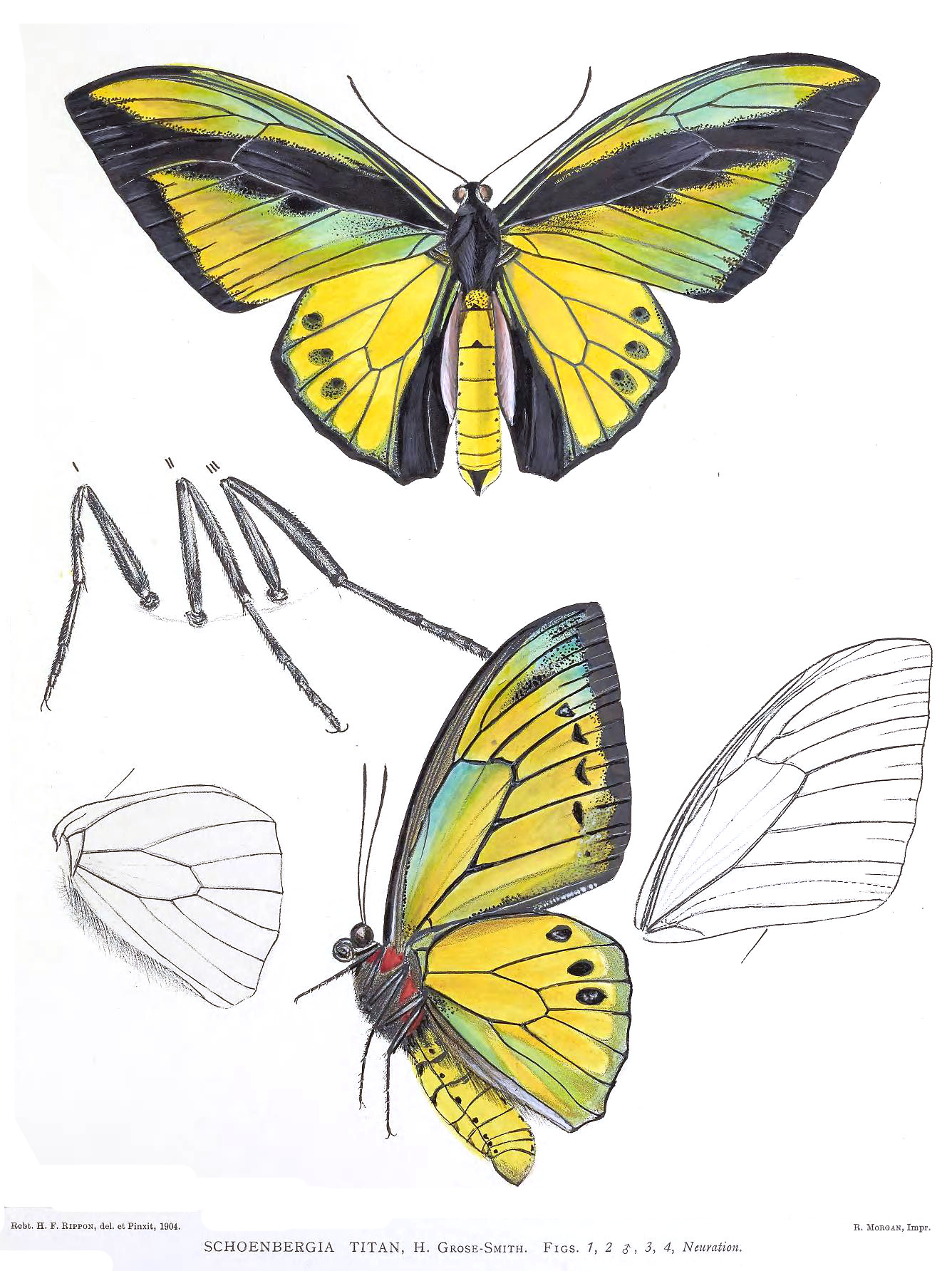
Ornithoptera goliath ssp. supremus male

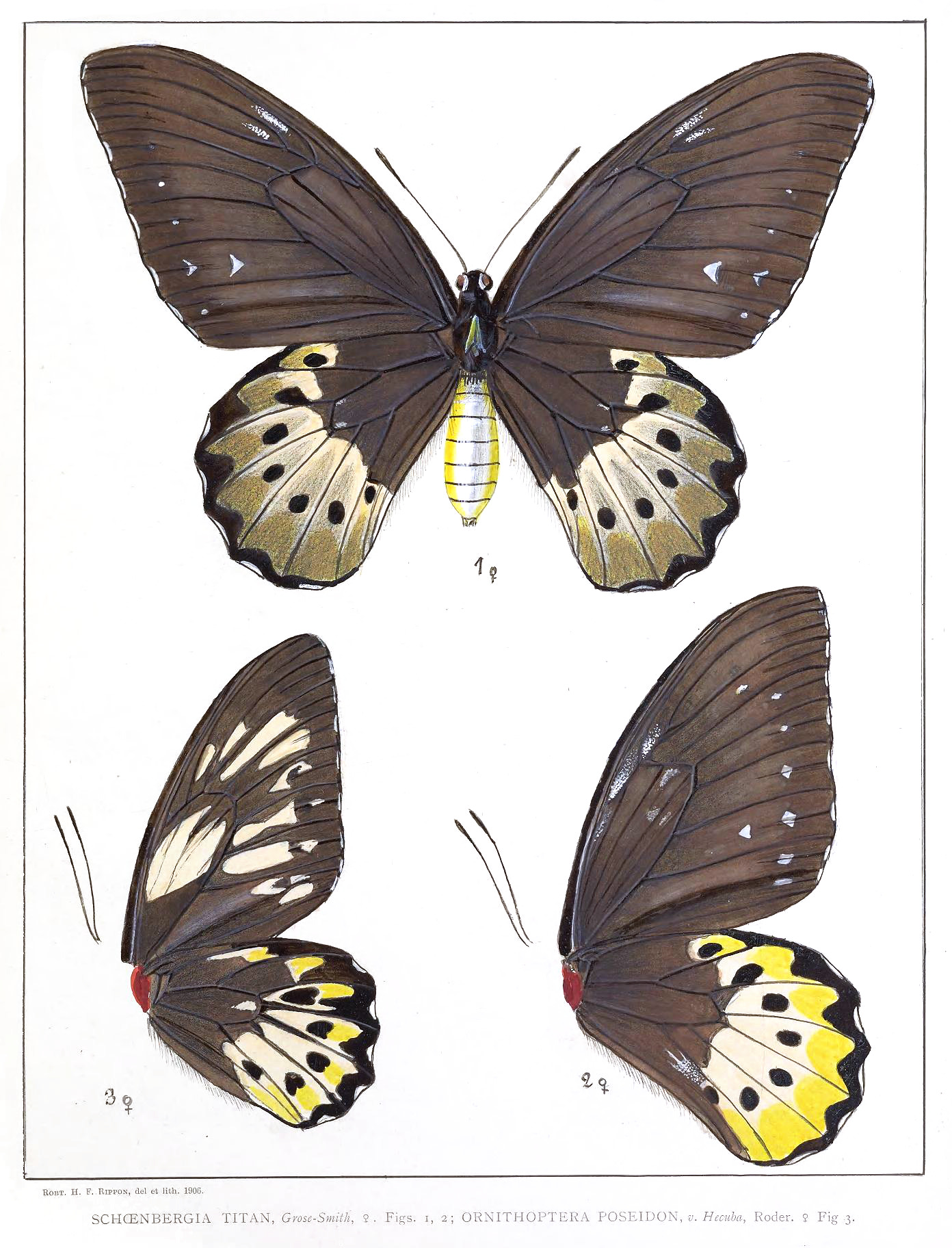
Ornithoptera goliath ssp. supremus female

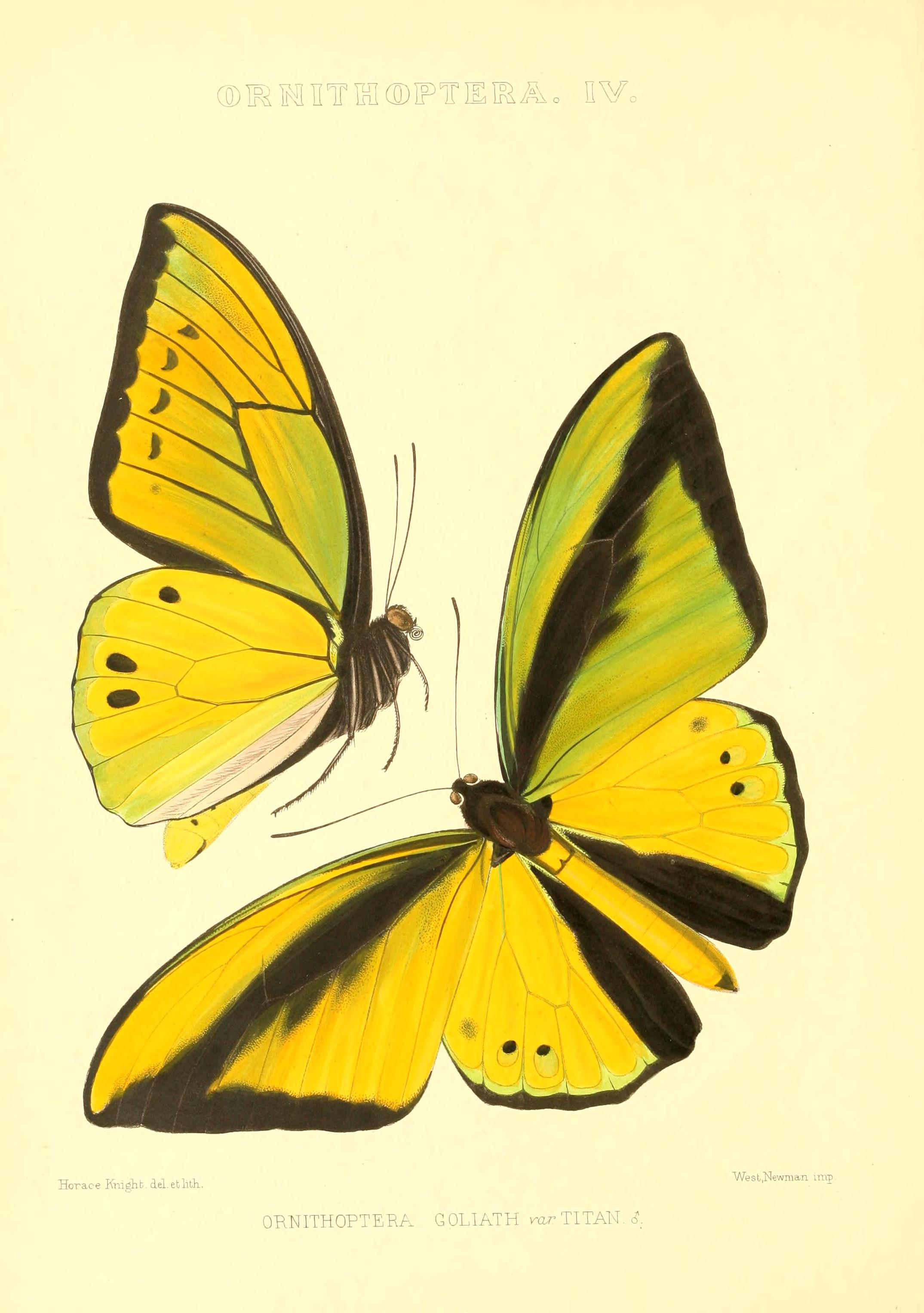
Male

== Biology ==
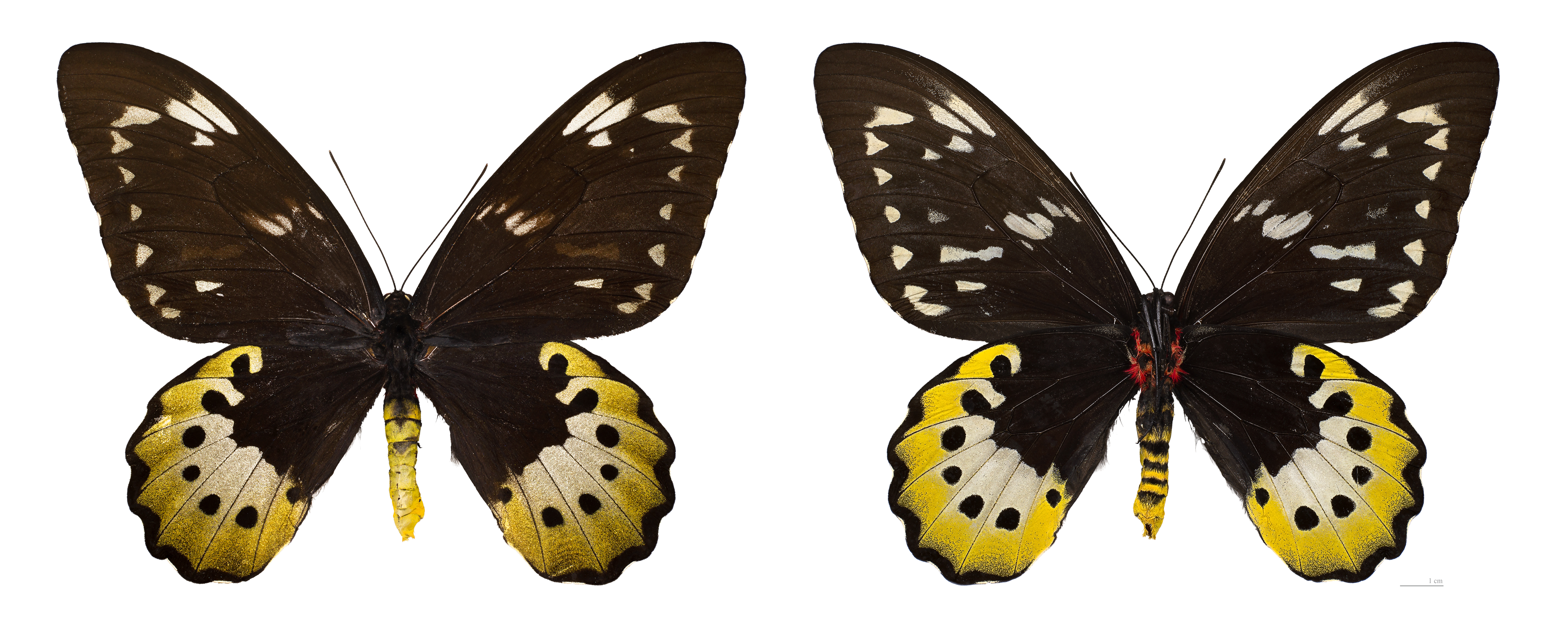
Ornithoptera goliath samson, female, both sides

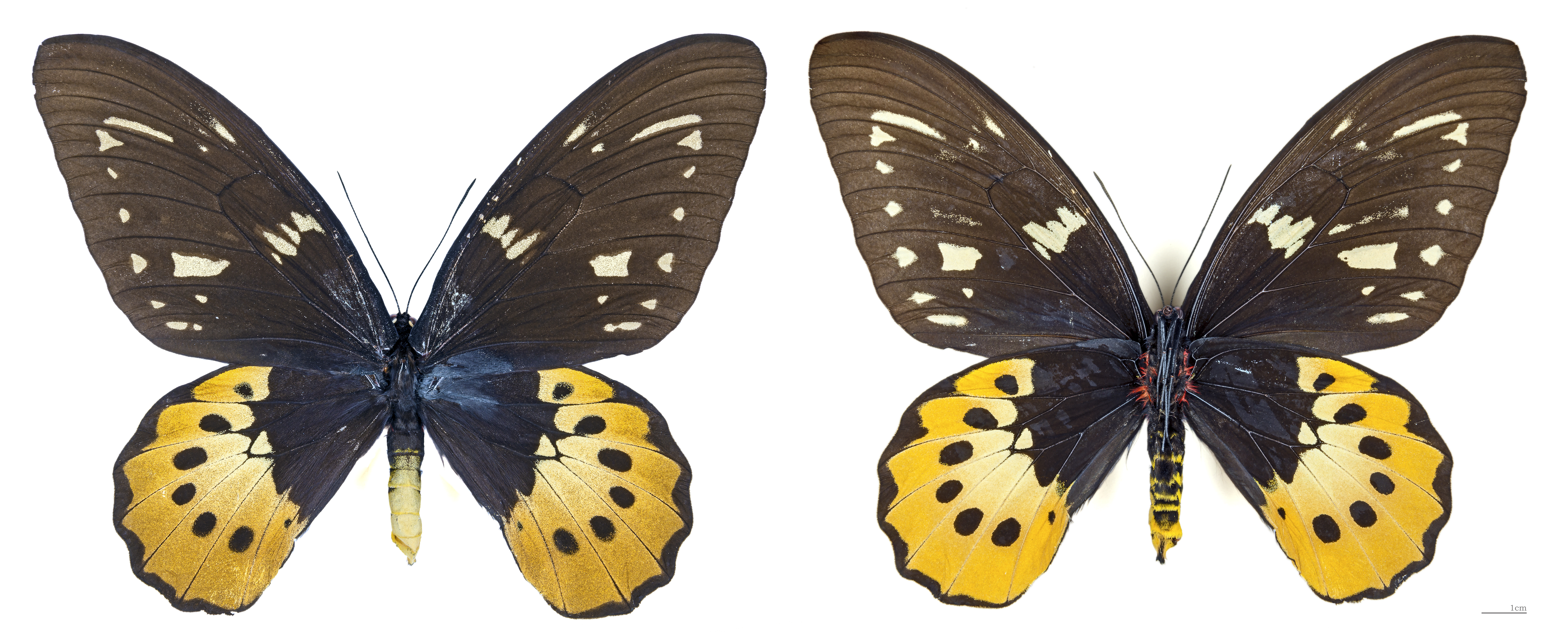
Ornithoptera goliath supremus female, both sides

The larvae are monophagous on a species of Aristolochia which can be 20 or more metres high and so reaching into the canopy. The eggs, up to 20, are laid singly on small plants or severally on larger plants. The young larvae feed on new leaves, as they grow they feed on older leaves and finally on the bark of the stems which may be severed. The vine may be eaten down to the root. Pupation is on the underside of a leaf of a nearby shrub close to the host plant remains. Adult butterflies fly in the host plant's immediate habitat feeding on forest tree flowers especially those of the introduced Spathodea campanulata during the morning. The males have cryptic underside colouring and cannot easily be seen when resting in the warmer hours of the day. Females rest with the wings open. Flight is leisurely, but controlled and powerful. Males pursue their females for long distances, rising high over the forest canopy then folding their wings and diving down to tree level to mate, even though they risk hindwing damage by the sharp tarsal claws of females. Males suffer similar damage when attacked by males of Ornithoptera priamus.

== Distribution ==
Ornithoptera goliath lives in rainforests of New Guinea and adjacent smaller islands.

== Subspecies ==
Five subspecies are recognised:

- Ornithoptera goliath atlas Rothschild, 1908 Irian Jaya; Onin Peninsula, Weyland Mountains or Köbowrè Range Papua; Cenderawasih Bay
- Ornithoptera goliath procus Rothschild, 1914 Seram Island
- Ornithoptera goliath samson Niepelt, 1913 Bird's Head Peninsula including Arfak Mountains
- Ornithoptera goliath supremus Röber, 1896 Eastern New Guinea from N.E. Irian Jaya in the west, to the east of New Guinea and Goodenough Island
- Ornithoptera goliath ukihidei Hanafusa, 1994 Yapen Island (off the north coast of Irian Jaya)

Subspecies synonyms

- Ornithoptera goliath sorongensis Morita & Sugiyama, 1998 junior synonym of ssp. atlas Rothschild, 1908
- titan Grose-Smith, 1900 synonym of S. goliath supremus. The name titan probably applies to dark females of S. g. supremus only.

== Conservation ==
The villagers of New Guinea farm these butterflies as a means of generating income, often by selling the specimens to foreign collectors. Harvesting the butterflies is legal so long as a permit is obtained. Butterfly farming allows the villagers to acquire income from the environment without destroying it, preventing damage to wild populations of an uncommon butterfly. In his 1983 report to the Department of Primary Industries, Papua New Guinea, M.J. Parsons wrote that "Ironically it is now becoming an accepted fact that the very demand for Ornithoptera is one of the main assets which will ensure their future survival if they can be exploited in the correct way."

A mosaic gynandromorph specimen of this species, sold by a Taiwanese dealer for US$28,000 in July 2006, possibly set the world record for the highest price paid for a butterfly.

The Goliath birdwing is listed on CITES Appendix II, limiting the international exportation of the species to those who are granted a permit. The IUCN has classified this butterfly as a species of "least concern", but does not have a known population trend.

== Gallery ==
Selection of museum specimens of Ornithoptera goliath
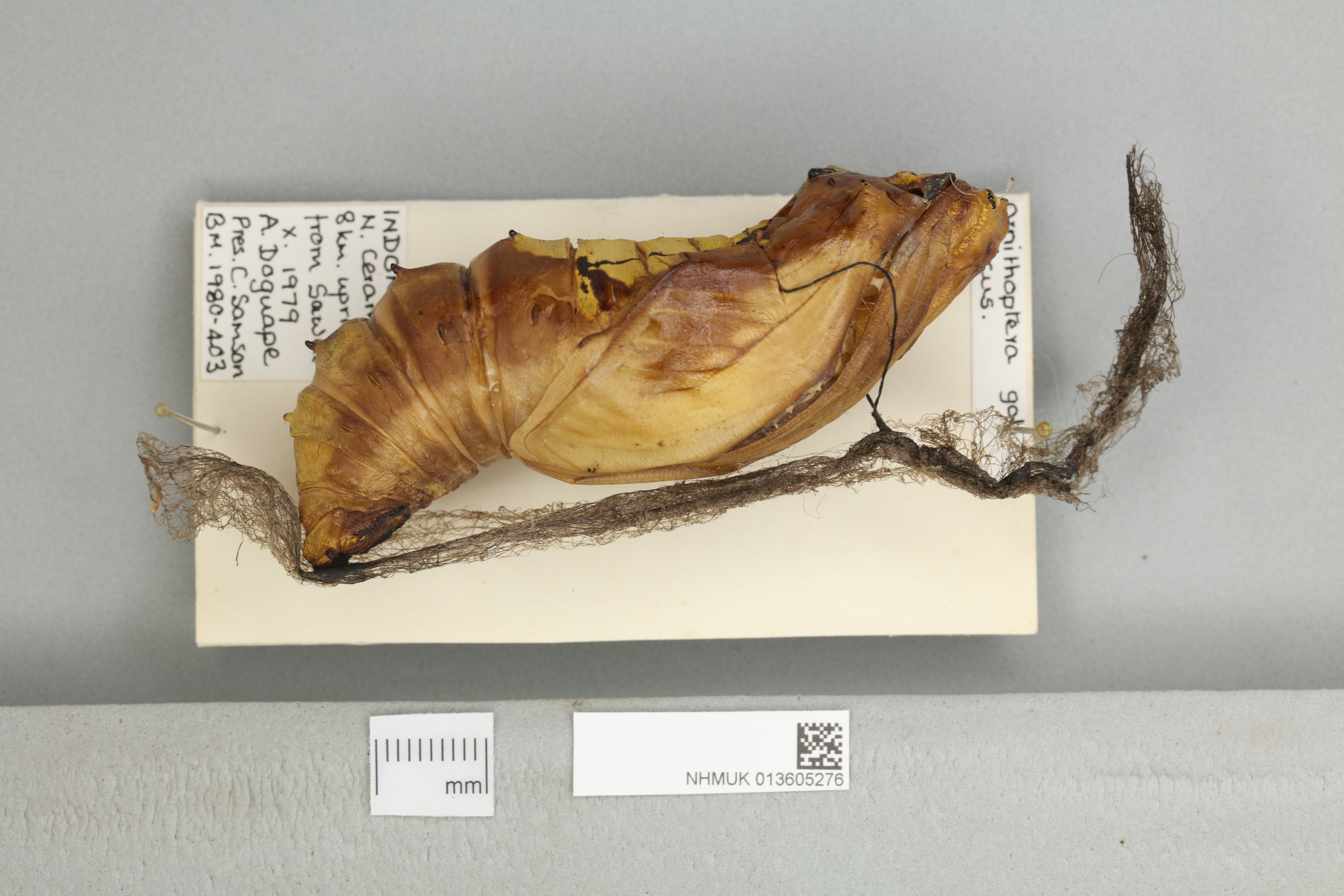
Ornithoptera goliath procus, pupa lateral view

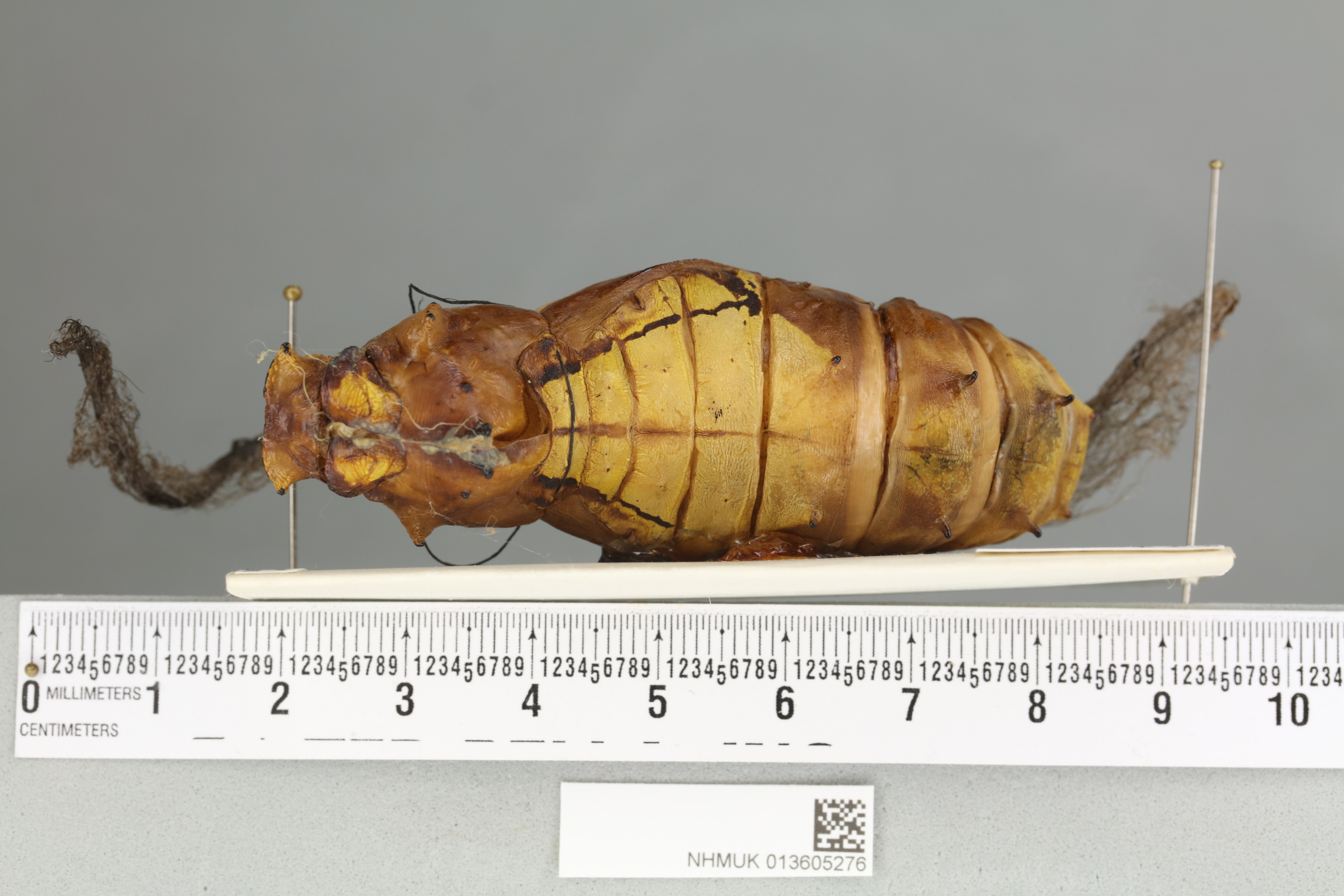
Ornithoptera goliath procus, pupa dorsal view

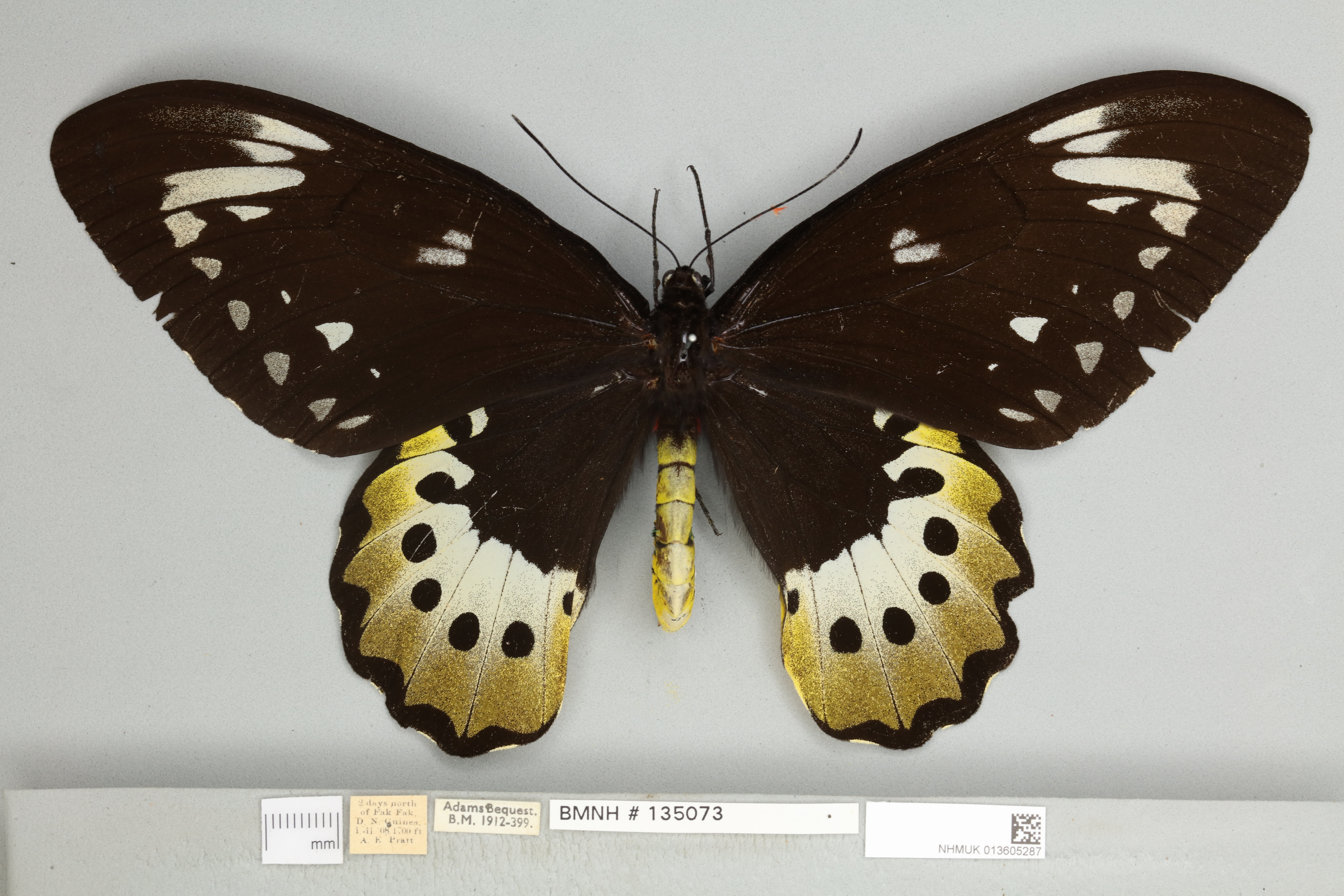
Ornithoptera goliath atlas, female dorsal view

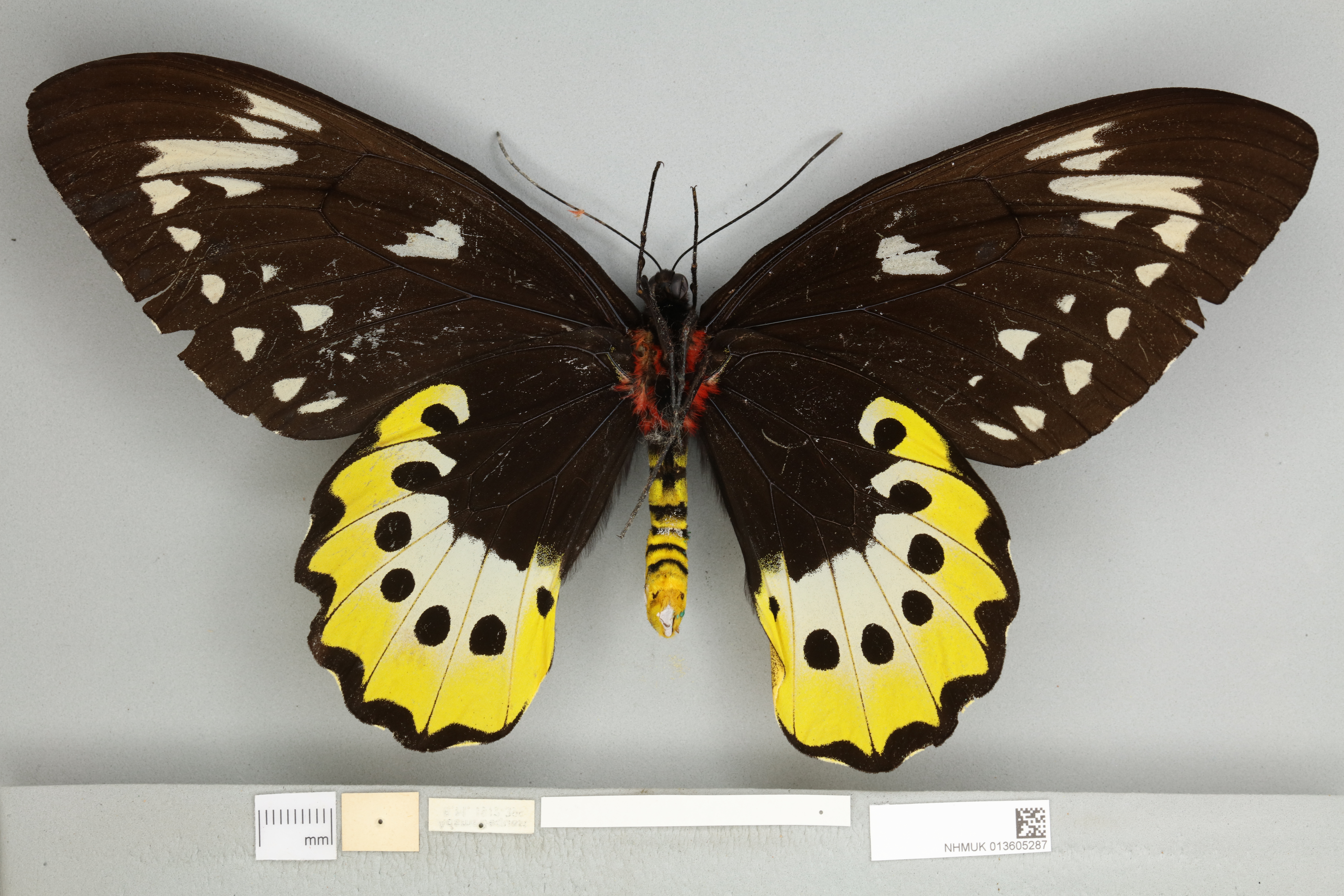
Ornithoptera goliath atlas, female ventral view

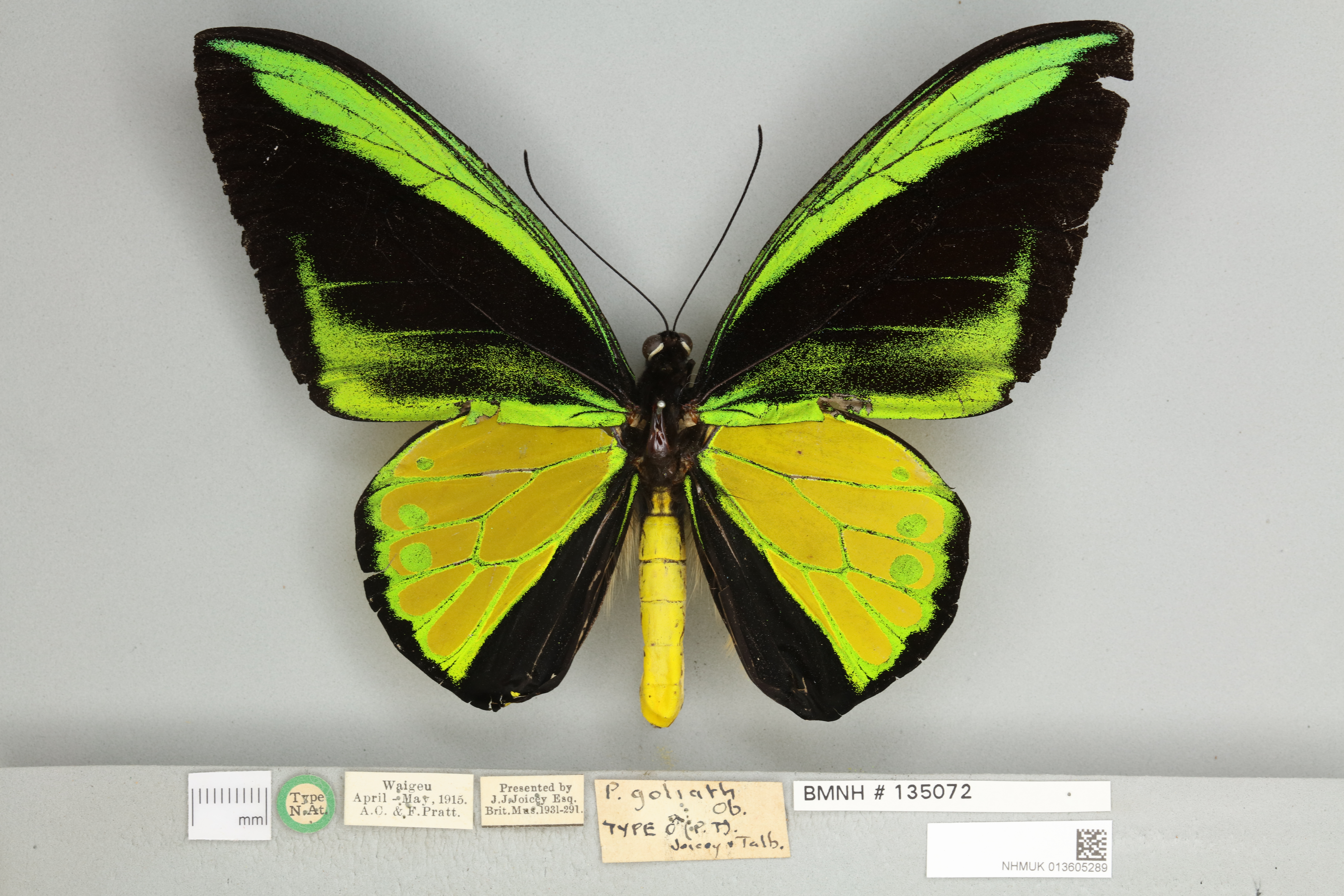
Ornithoptera g. goliath, male dorsal view

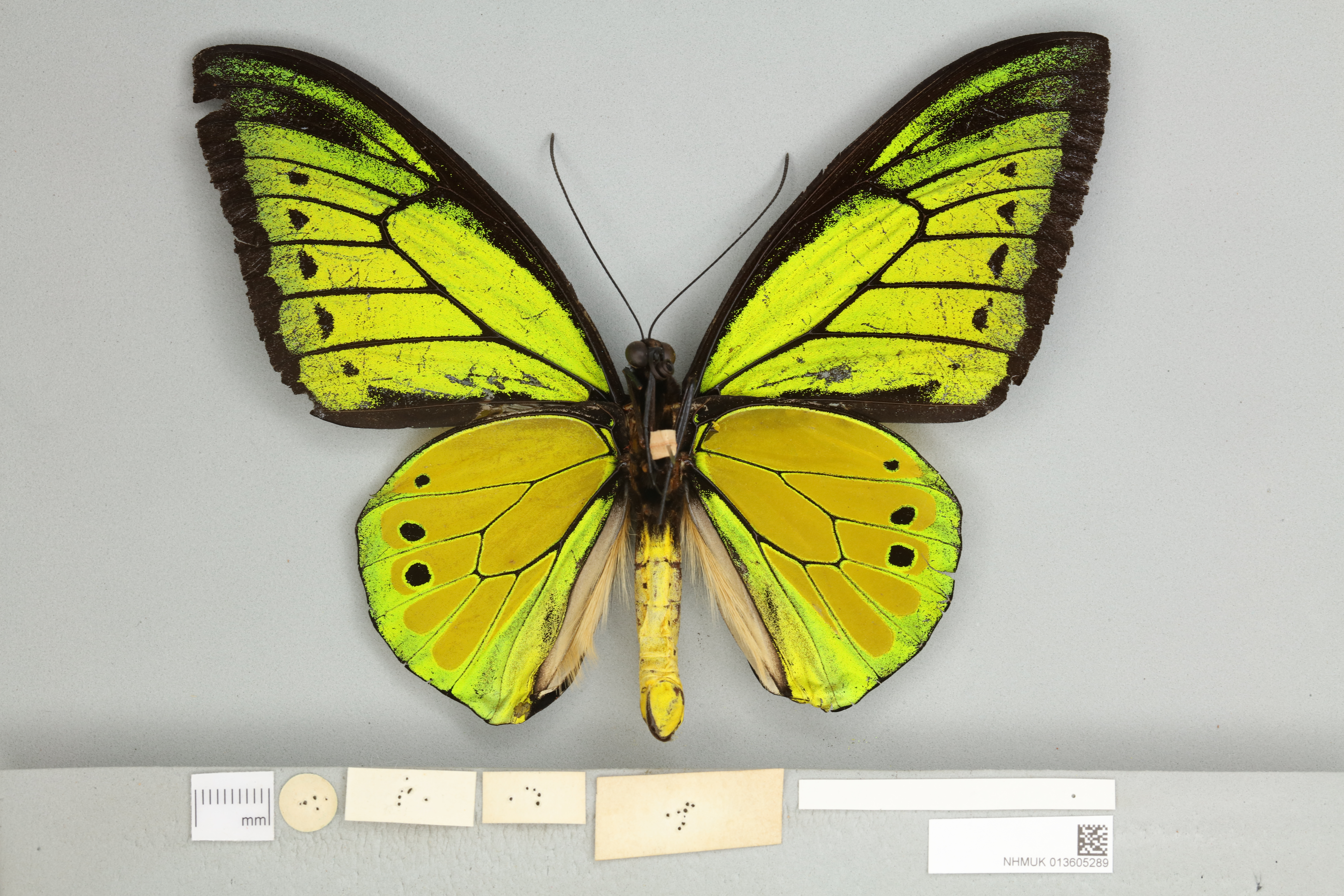
Ornithoptera g. goliath, male ventral view

== Other sources ==
- D'Abrera, B. (1975). Birdwing Butterflies of the World. Country Life Books, London.
- Collins, N. Mark; Morris, Michael G. (1985). Threatened Swallowtail Butterflies of the World: The IUCN Red Data Book. Gland & Cambridge: IUCN. ISBN 978-2-88032-603-6 – via Biodiversity Heritage Library.
- Haugum, J. & Low, A.M. (1978–1985). A Monograph of the Birdwing Butterflies. 2 volumes. Scandinavian Press, Klampenborg; 663 pp.
