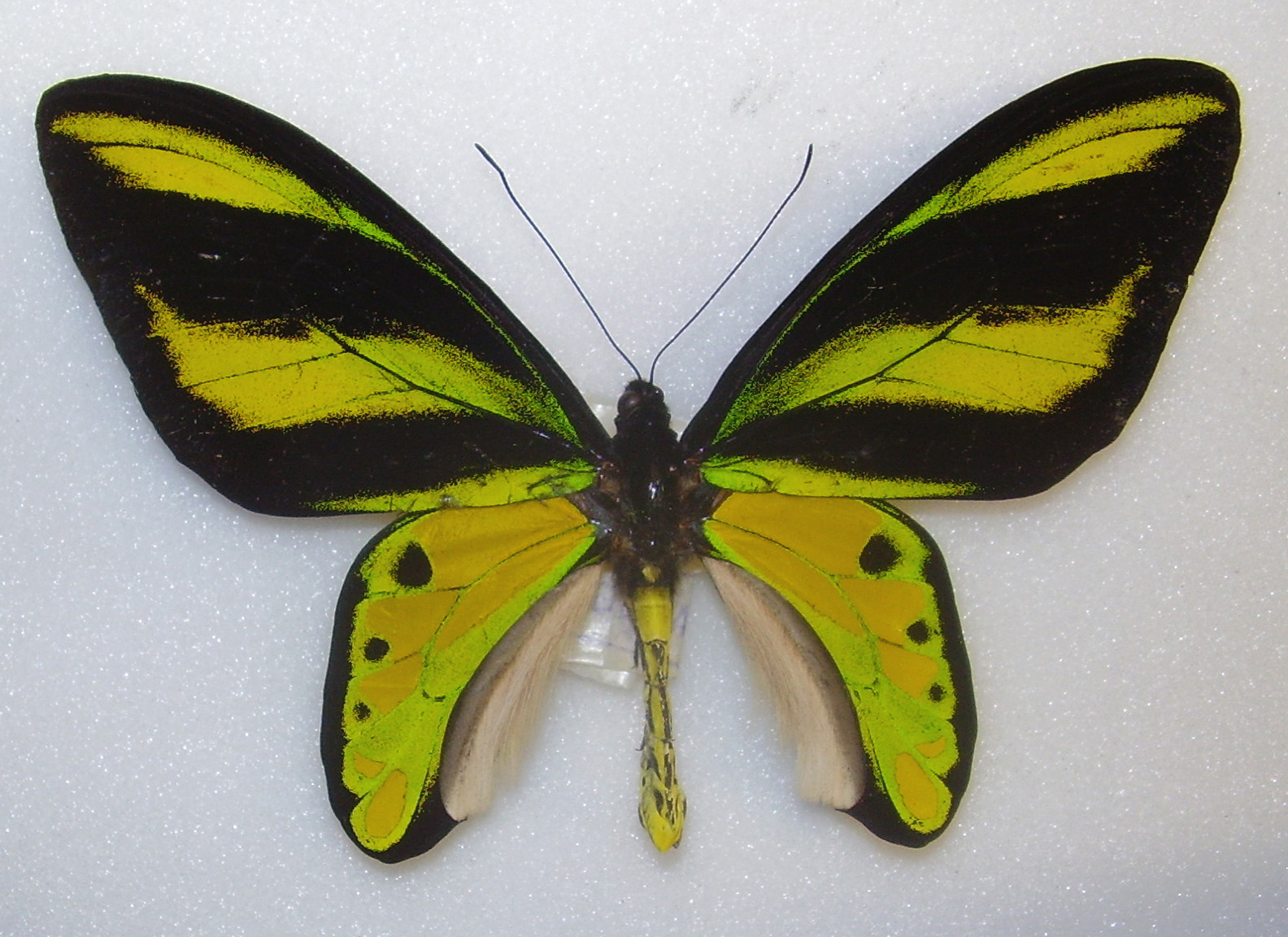
- Male, dorsal side
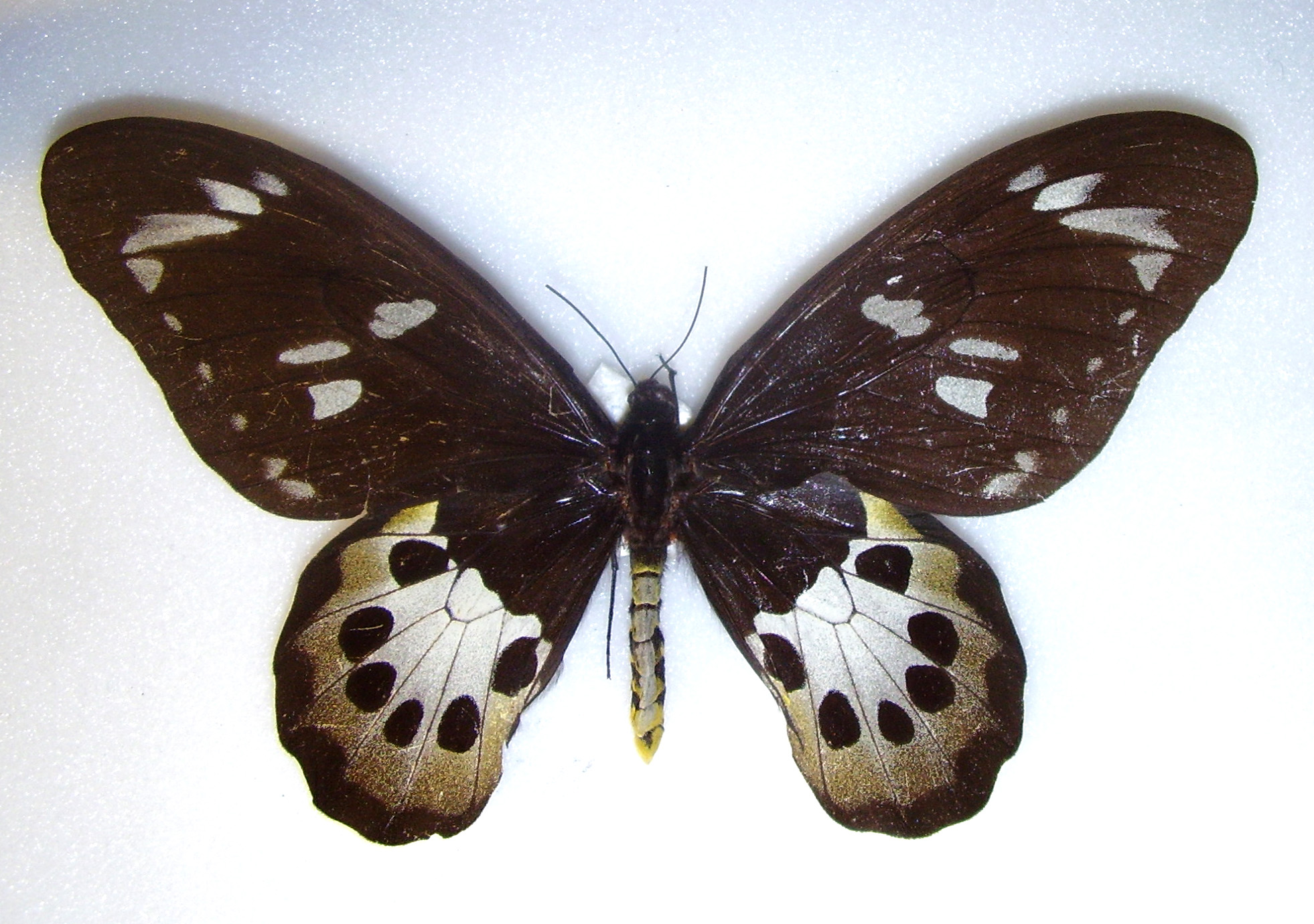
- Female, dorsal side

Conservation status
- Least Concern (IUCN 3.1)
- CITES Appendix II (CITES)

Scientific classification
- Kingdom: Animalia
- Phylum: Arthropoda
- Class: Insecta
- Order: Lepidoptera
- Family: Papilionidae
- Genus: Ornithoptera
- Species: O. tithonus

Binomial name
- Ornithoptera tithonus De Haan, 1841

= Ornithoptera tithonus =

Tithonus birdwing

Species of birdwing butterfly

Ornithoptera tithonus, the Tithonus birdwing, is a species of birdwing butterfly found on New Guinea and other neighbouring islands.

Ornithoptera tithonus is, like all other birdwing butterflies, a strictly protected species. It is listed in Appendix II of CITES, restricting international export to those who have been granted a permit.

== Subspecies ==
There are seven recognised subspecies:

- O. t. cytherea (Kobayashi & Koiwaya, 1980)
- O. t. dominici Schäffler, 2001
- O. t. makikoae Morita, 1998
- O. t. misoolana (Deslisle, 1985)
- O. t. misresiana (Joicey & Noakes, 1916)
- O. t. tithonus De Haan, 1841
- O. t. waigeuensis Rothschild, 1897

== Description ==
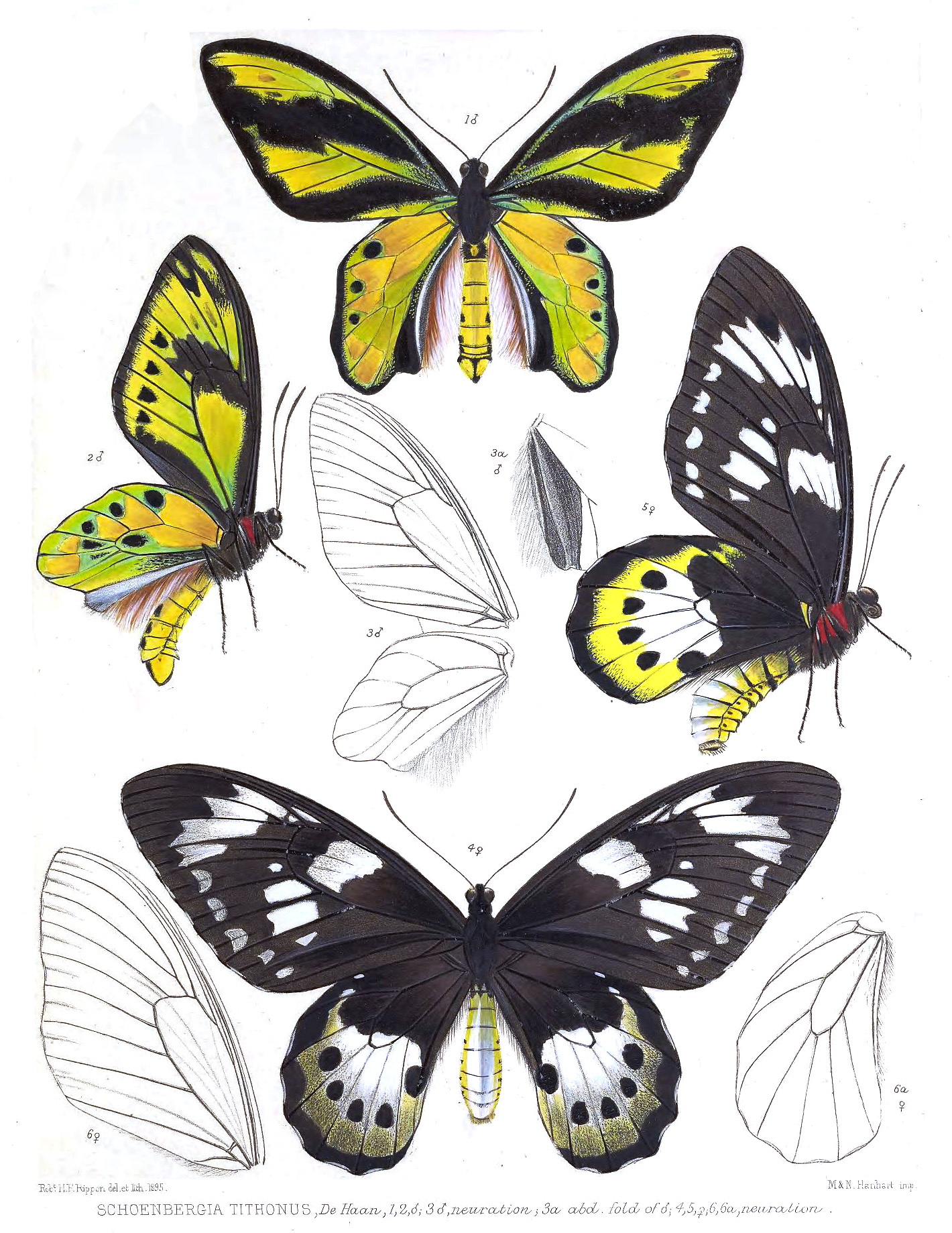

Male: The forewings are black. At the wing tip there is a green stripe and one golden spot. In the middle of the wing there is a large, green band. The rear edge is green. The underside of Ornithoptera tithonus is black. At the outer edge and in the middle of the wing there is green area. The veins are black and they cleave the green areas. The golden spot at the wing tip is transparent like a window. The hindwings of Ornithoptera tithonus are multicoloured. The inner part of the wing and the edge are black. The other part of the wing is green. The green area contains some golden spots and three black spots. The underside is green. Some golden spots and some black spots are on the wing. The inner edge is very hairy.

The abdomen is yellow. The head and thorax are black. The underside of thorax has a red hair-coat.

Female: The female covers the upper range of the wingspan. It is significantly larger than the male. The basic colour of the female is dark brown. At the outer edge and in the middle of the wing there are some white spots. On the hindwings there is a big white area. The outer edge of the white area is yellow. Between the white part and the yellow part there is a chain of black spots. The ventral side is similar to the dorsal side, but with more intense colouration.

== Other sources ==
- Haugum, J. & Low, A.M. (1983). [1978-1983] A Monograph of the Birdwing Butterflies. The systematics of Ornithoptera, Troides and related genera. Vols 1 & 2. Klampenborg: Scandinavian Science Press 356 pp.
- D'Abrera, B. (1975) Birdwing Butterflies of the World. Country Life Books, London.
- Deslisle, G. (2004) A taxonomic revision of the "birdwing butterflies of paradise", genus Ornithoptera based on the adult morphology (Lepidoptera, Papilionidae). Lambillionea, 104 (4): 1 - 151.

== Gallery ==
Selection of museum specimens of Ornithoptera tithonus
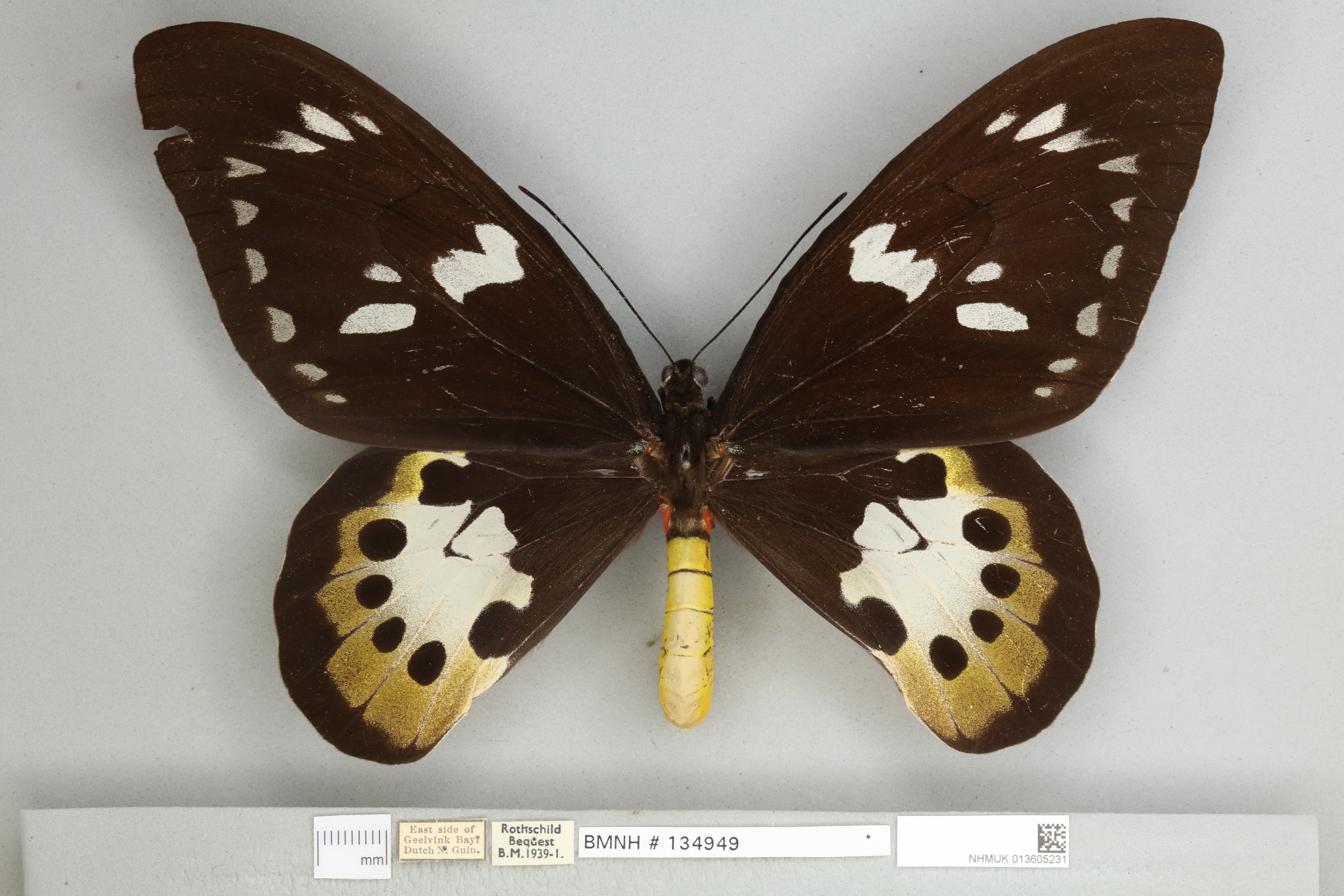
Ornithoptera tithonus tithonus, female dorsal view

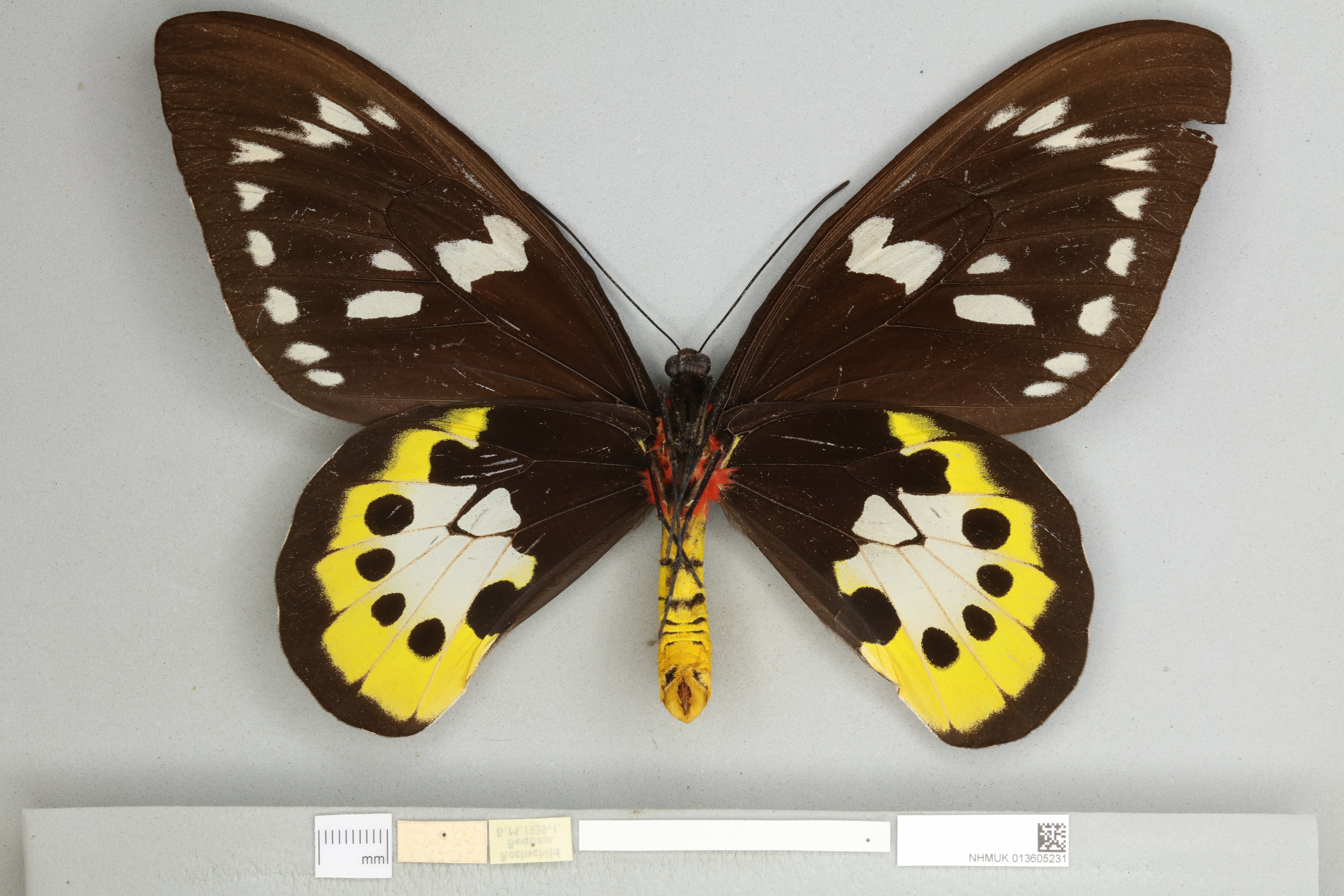
Ornithoptera tithonus tithonus, female ventral view

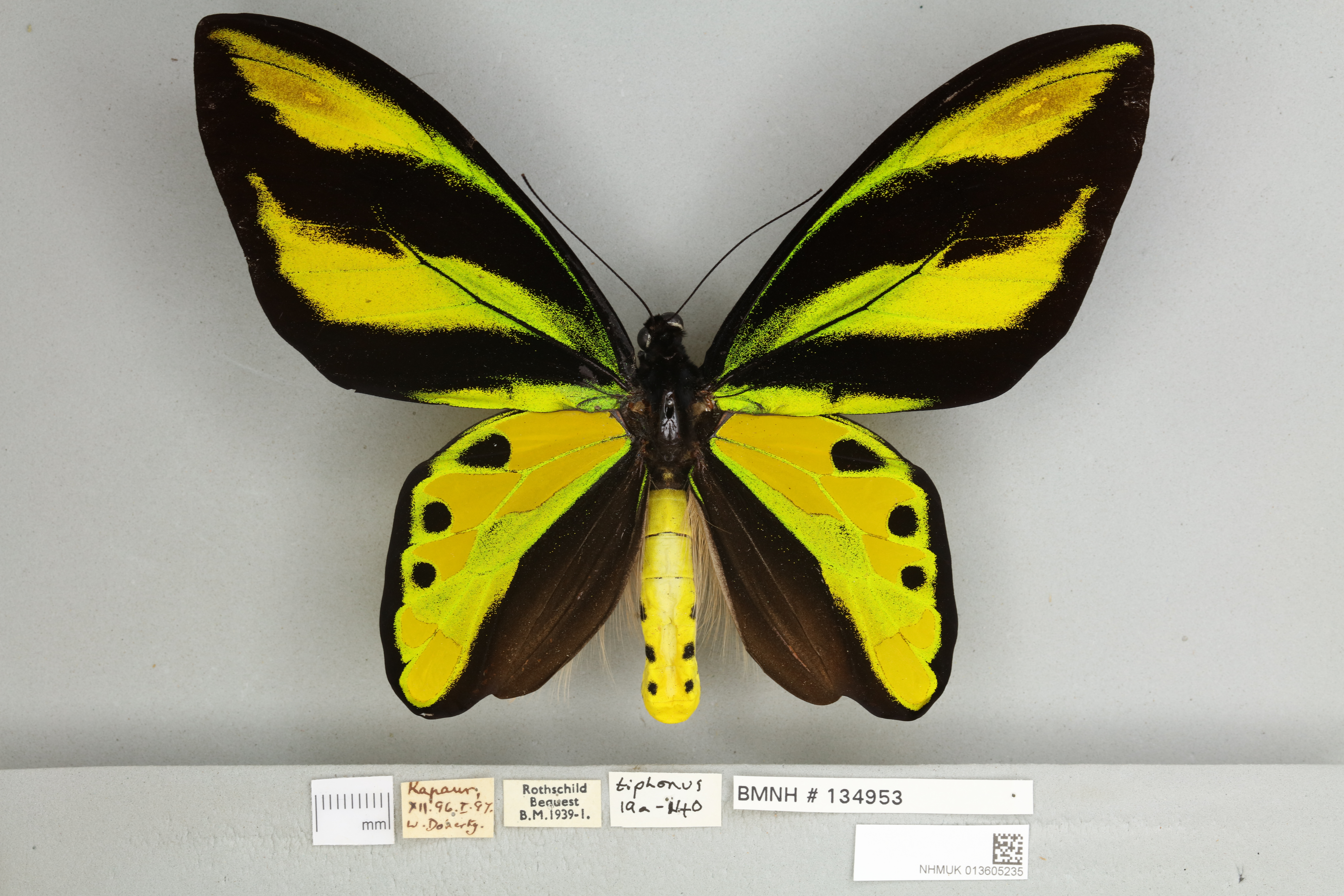
Ornithoptera tithonus tithonus, male dorsal view

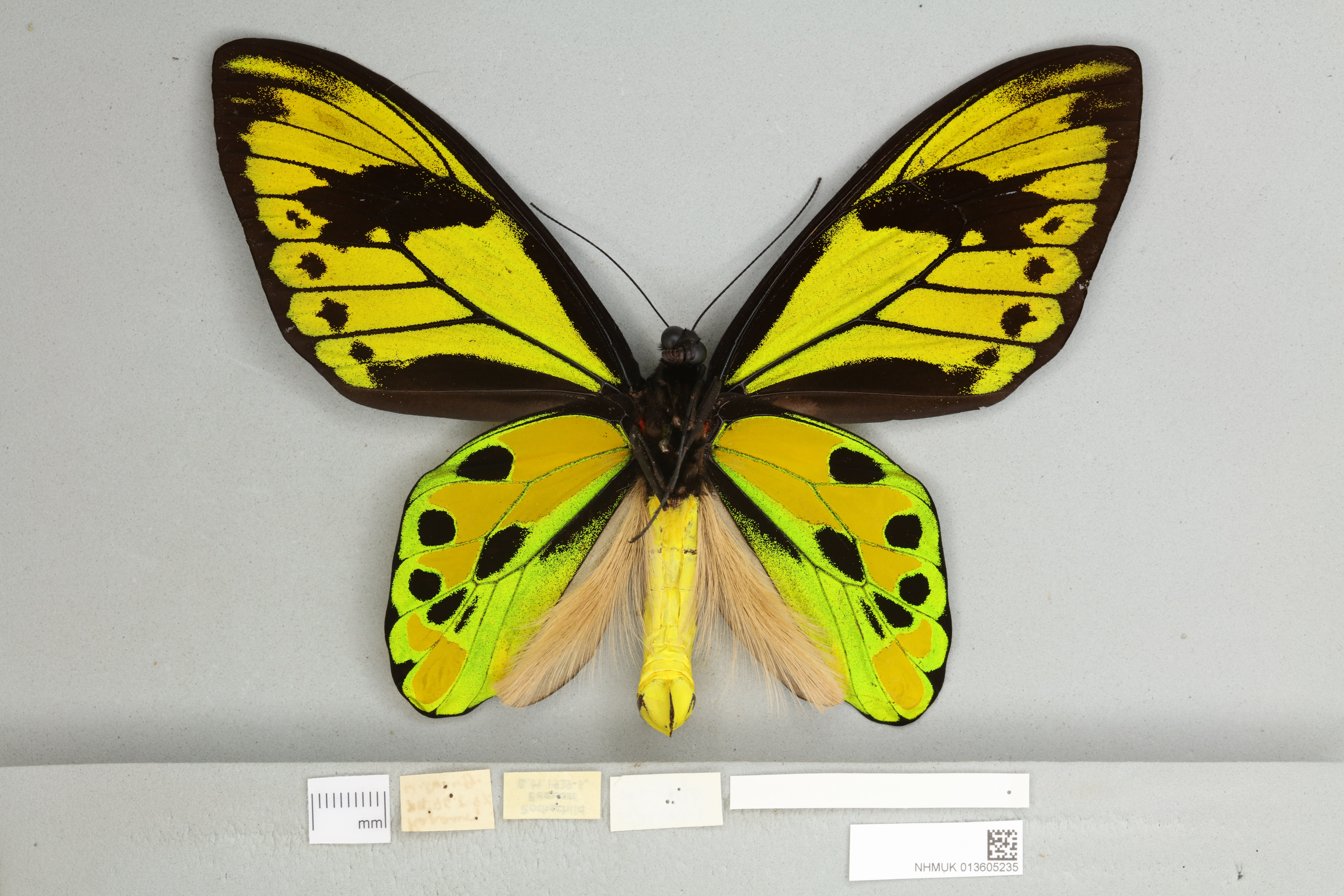
Ornithoptera tithonus tithonus, male ventral view
