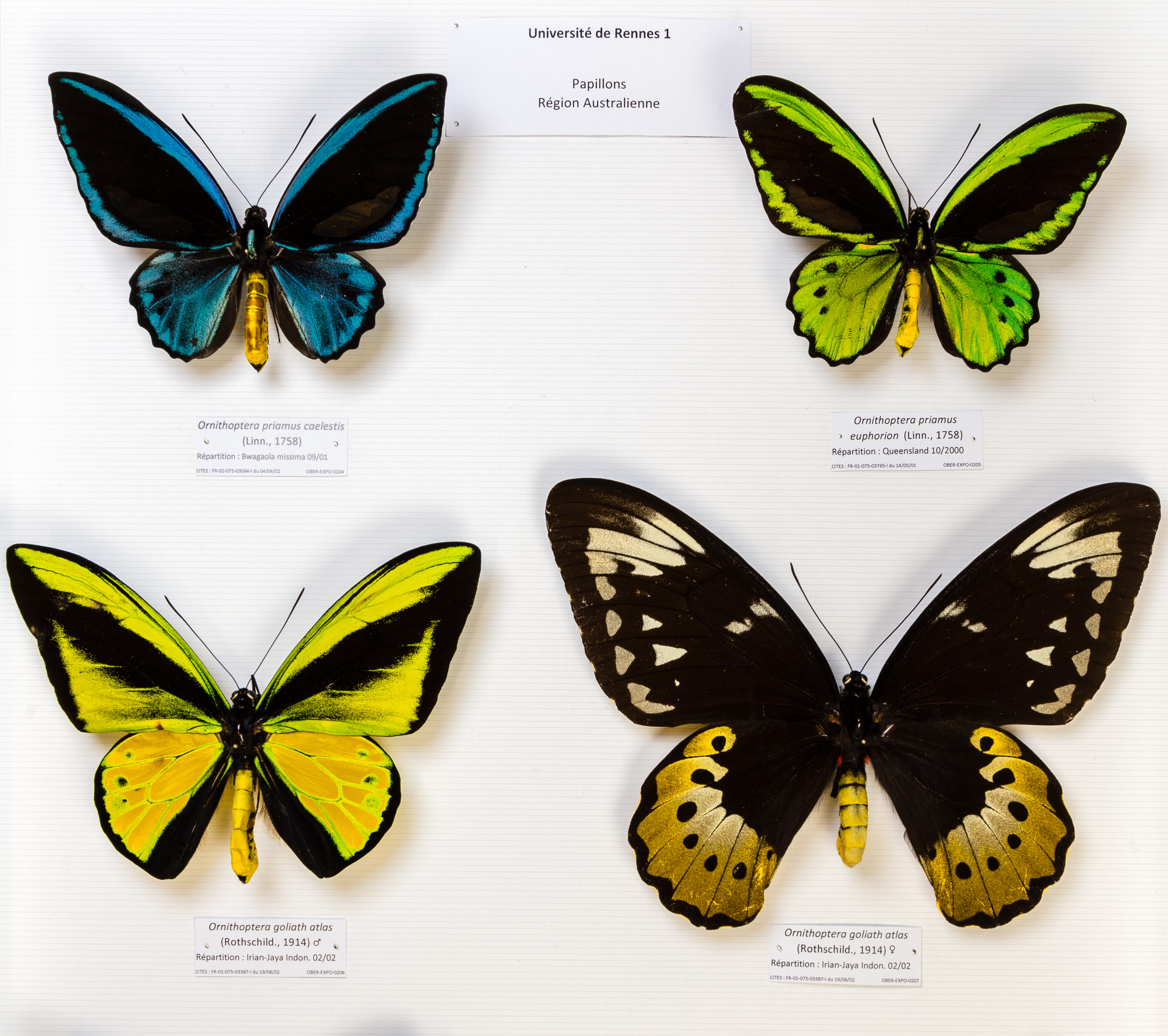
- Ornithoptera spp. (top left: male O. priamus caelestis; top right: male O. euphorion; bottom left: male O. goliath atlas; bottom right: female O. goliath atlas)

Scientific classification
- Kingdom: Animalia
- Phylum: Arthropoda
- Class: Insecta
- Order: Lepidoptera
- Family: Papilionidae
- Tribe: Troidini
- Genus: Ornithoptera; Boisduval, 1832

Type species
- Papilio priamus Linnaeus, 1758

= Ornithoptera =

Genus of butterfly

Ornithoptera (from Ancient Greek ὄρνις (órnis), meaning "bird", and πτερόν (pterón), meaning "wing") is a genus of birdwing butterflies found in the northern portion of the Australasian realm, east of Weber's line; the Moluccas, New Guinea, the Solomon Islands, and northeastern Australia; except for Ornithoptera richmondia, which may be found in far northeastern New South Wales, Australia, therefore the southernmost distribution of birdwings. This genus includes the two largest butterfly species in the world, the Queen Alexandra's birdwing and the Goliath birdwing. Ornithoptera species are highly prized by insect collectors because they are rare, large, and considered exceptionally beautiful.

== Species ==
subgenus: Aetheoptera

- Ornithoptera victoriae – Queen Victoria's birdwing

subgenus: Ornithoptera

- Ornithoptera aesacus – Obi Island birdwing
- Ornithoptera croesus – Wallace's golden birdwing
- Ornithoptera euphorion – Cairns birdwing
- Ornithoptera priamus – common green birdwing
- Ornithoptera richmondia – Richmond birdwing

subgenus: Schoenbergia

- Ornithoptera chimaera – chimaera birdwing
- Ornithoptera goliath – Goliath birdwing
- Ornithoptera meridionalis – southern tailed birdwing
- Ornithoptera paradisea – paradise birdwing
- Ornithoptera rothschildi – Rothschild's birdwing
- Ornithoptera tithonus – Tithonus birdwing

subgenus: Straatmana

- Ornithoptera alexandrae – Queen Alexandra's birdwing
