= John Waterstradt =

Johannes or John Waterstradt (8 March 1869 – 1944) was a German-born Danish natural history collector and mineral prospector in Southeast Asia. He collected birds, orchids, butterflies and moths from the Papua New Guinea and Indonesian regions for several European collectors including Otto Staudinger and Hans Fruhstorfer. The mountain peacock pheasant Polyplectron inopinatum was named and described by Walter Rothschild from a specimen collected by him. He was a pioneer of commercial orchid cultivation and hybridization in Denmark.

Waterstradt came from a Mecklenburg family that had moved to Denmark. After school, he was expected to join the family business in horticulture but he joined the navy after a year. He had a childhood interest in natural history but an interest in entomology grew after meeting a group of German entomological collectors aboard a ship to Australia. He joined them, Mitschke, Schwarz and Sturm, collectors for Otto Staudinger, on a collection trip to Sri Lanka. Realizing that he was more capable than these collectors, Waterstradt began to collect for Hans Fruhstorfer and Staudinger. He also collected orchids for Hugh Low and Co., London in Kinabalu. In 1895 he began to consider an import-export business from Palawan, prospecting for minerals and coal while also collecting natural history specimens. In 1899 an attempt on his life was made which Waterstradt attributed to Enche Musim, possibly related to oil concession agreements with the Sultan of Brunei. He was shot in the right shoulder and was subsequently forced to write with his left hand. In 1904, Waterstradt returned to Europe and married Laura Fritzberger and managed the family garden business while also growing orchids that he had collected which he began to sell. His orchid business was the only one in Denmark at the time. He made trips to Mount Kinabalu in 1908 and 1912 but returned due to poor health and convalesced in London. He died in 1944 in Copenhagen.

Clytellus waterstradti, a beetle, is named after him from his collections.
