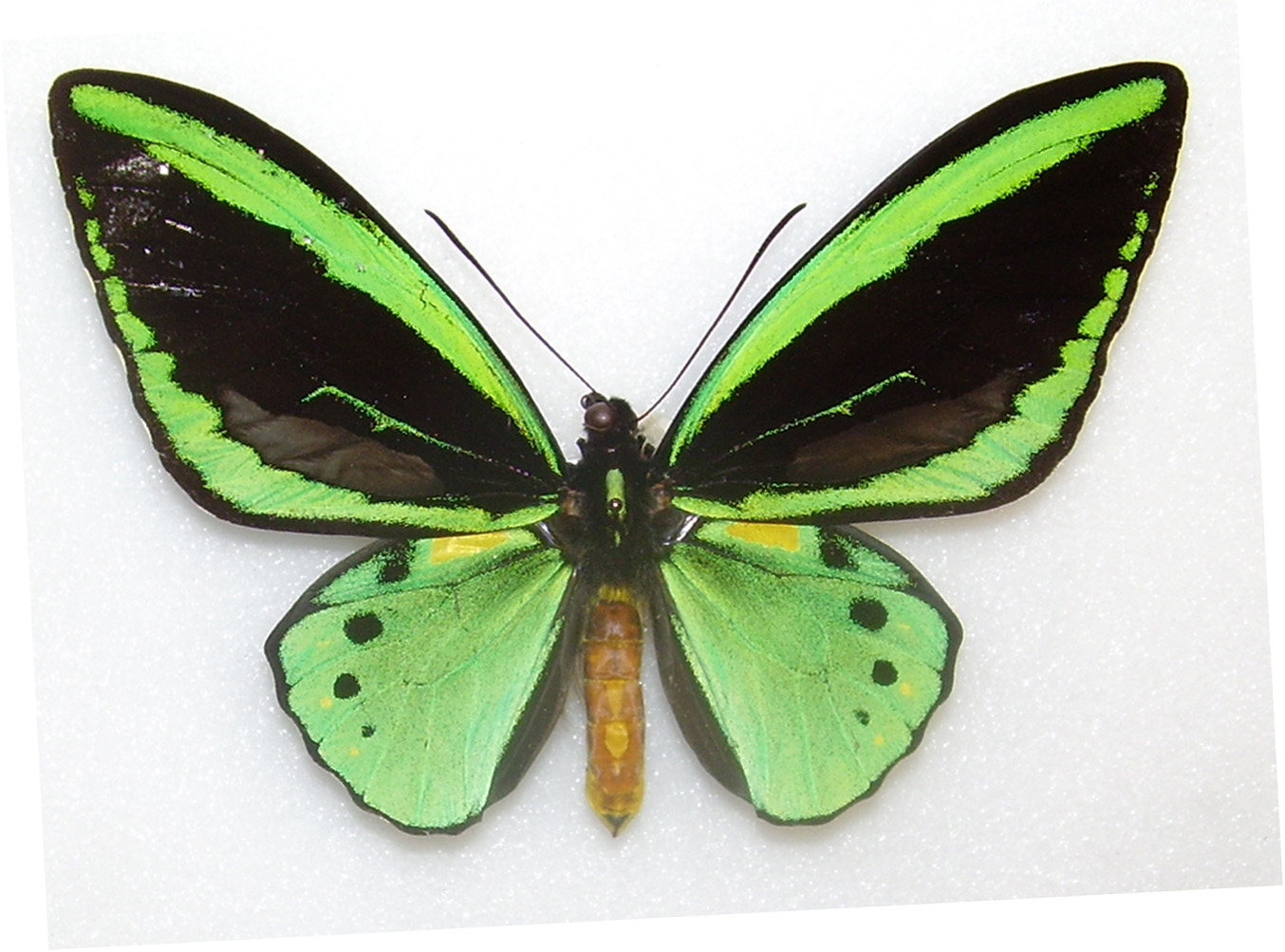
- O. p. pronomus, male

Conservation status
- Least Concern (IUCN 3.1)
- CITES Appendix II

Scientific classification
- Kingdom: Animalia
- Phylum: Arthropoda
- Class: Insecta
- Order: Lepidoptera
- Family: Papilionidae
- Genus: Ornithoptera
- Species: O. priamus

Binomial name
- Ornithoptera priamus (Linnaeus, 1758)
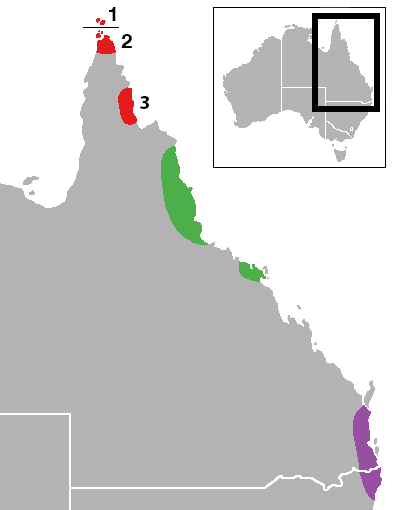
- Distribution of Ornithoptera priamus (in red), with O. p. poseidon (1), O. p. pronomus (2), O. p. macalpinei (3), and other species of Ornithoptera in Australia. Note: range is not limited to Australia.

= Ornithoptera priamus =

Species of birdwing butterfly

Ornithoptera priamus, the common green birdwing, Cape York birdwing, Priam's birdwing, northern birdwing or New Guinea birdwing is a widespread species of birdwing butterfly found in the central and south Moluccas, New Guinea, Bismarck Archipelago, Solomon Islands, and north-east Australia.

The specific name of Ornithoptera priamus, is named after Priam (/ˈpraɪ.əm/, Greek Πρίαμος Priamos), the king of Troy during the Trojan War.

== Description ==
Ornithoptera priamus is sexually dimorphic.

Male: The upperside forewings are velvety black. There is a green (most races) subcostal stripe and a green (most subspecies) marginal stripe bordering the termen, tormen and dorsum of the wing. The sex brand is black and longish. The underside of the forewing is black. There is a chain of bluish or green postdiscal spots.

The hindwings are green. At the wing's leading edge (costa) there are basal yellow-gold spots. There is also a postdiscal chain of black spots. The edge of the hindwing is black.

The underside is dark green or bluish. The yellow-golden spots are transparent. The veins are partly black and the marginal edge of the wing is black. At the outer edge there is a postdiscal chain of black spots.

The body (abdomen) is yellow. Head and thorax are black. The underside of thorax has a red hair coat.

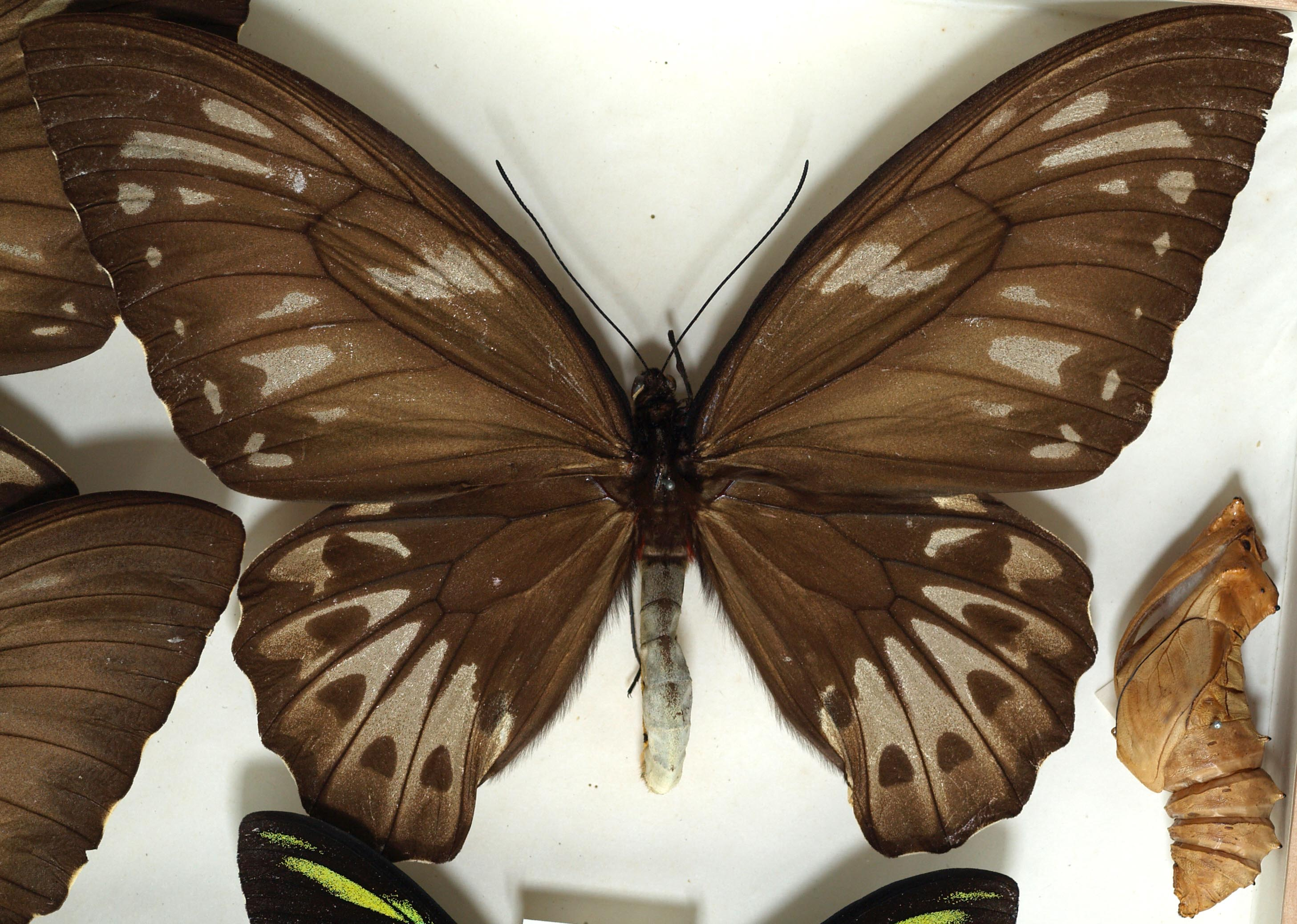
Mounted O. p. urvilleanus female with pupa at right

Female: The female is larger than the male and in the upper range of the wingspan. The basic colour of the female is dark brown. There is a chain of white postdiscal spots on the forewings. There is a chain of larger white postdiscal spots with dark centres on the hindwing. The underside is very similar to the upper.

Larva: First instar larvae are wine red on hatching. They soon turn black or dark brown. All segments have soft tubercles with stiff ends bearing black spines. On the 4th segment tubercles are red. The tubercles are dark brown on the other segments. In the second instar, the tubercles lack spines, the 4th tubercles are light red and on the other segments they are the same colour as the body. In the third instar, there is a white to pink saddlemark on the 4th segment. In the fourth and fifth instars, the ground colour is ashy grey to brown, the saddlemark on the 4th segment is white and the tubercles on the 4th segment are white. There may be saddlemarks on the 5th segment and the 6th segment. The tips of the tubercle are black and the osmeterium is dark red.

Pupa: The pupa is yellowish green or brown and is marked with greyish veins as in a leaf. It may have a broad dorsal pale saddle mark. The abdomen has eight pairs of sharp dorsal processes, directed laterally.

== Variation ==
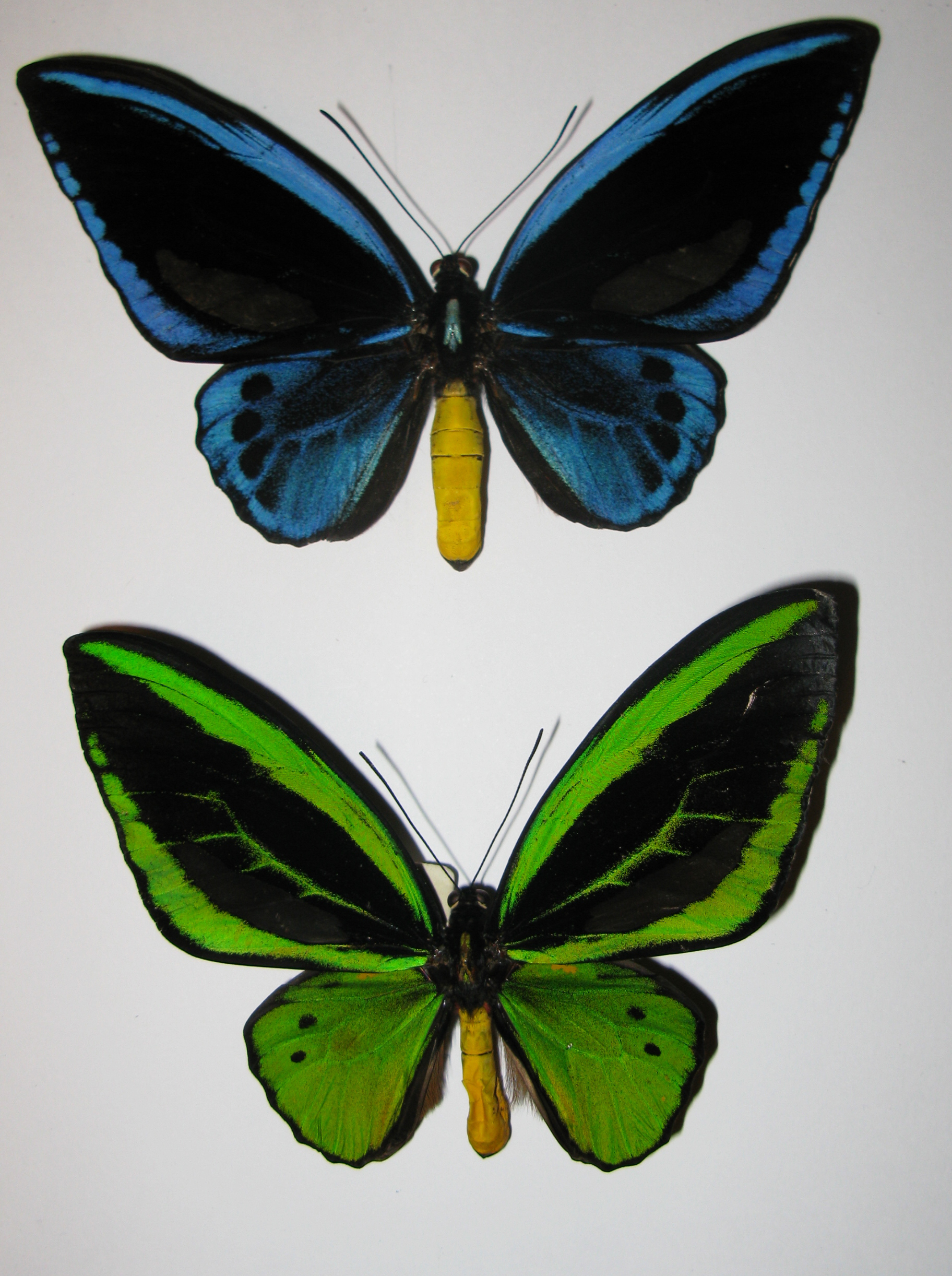
Males of O. p. urvillianus (above) and O. p. poseidon (below), showing some distinct variations. The former has sometimes been regarded as a separate species, but hybrids between these subspecies are viable.

Ornithoptera priamus is a variable species. It was originally described from Seram Island of Indonesia. As in other species of the genus Ornithoptera, the females are larger and less vividly coloured than the males, them being mainly blackish or dark brown with patterns in pale brown, yellow or white. Nonetheless, females are extremely variable, and they may have colour patterns similar to females of other Ornithoptera species.

In males, iridescent areas of the wing are typically green, although some subspecies endemic to island groups east of New Guinea have blue males. These subspecies are O. p. urvilleanus (New Ireland, Bougainville, and Solomon Islands), O. p. miokensis (Mioko Island), and O. p. caelestis (Louisiade Archipelago).

However, it is likely that O. p. miokensis is actually a hybrid between O. p. urvillianus and O. p. bornemanni from the neighbouring islands of New Britain and Bougainville. Specimens of this subspecies are variable, and can be identical to specimens of either parent, or intermediates. Immigration may also explain its rarity, as Mioko is a small island and, as of 2001, its host plants had been reduced to a few Aristolochia tagala vines growing in a local village.

Several species currently recognised as distinct have previously been considered subspecies of O. priamus by different authors. These are: O. aesacus, O. croesus, O. euphorion, and O. richmondia. The last two are still regarded as subspecies of O. priamus by some.

=== Subspecies ===
There have been as many as 99 subspecies described (most of which are synonyms of O. p. poseidon), with many more named variants and forms described for both sexes. Some list as few as six subspecies (including nominate), but a taxonomic review is needed and most recognise more:

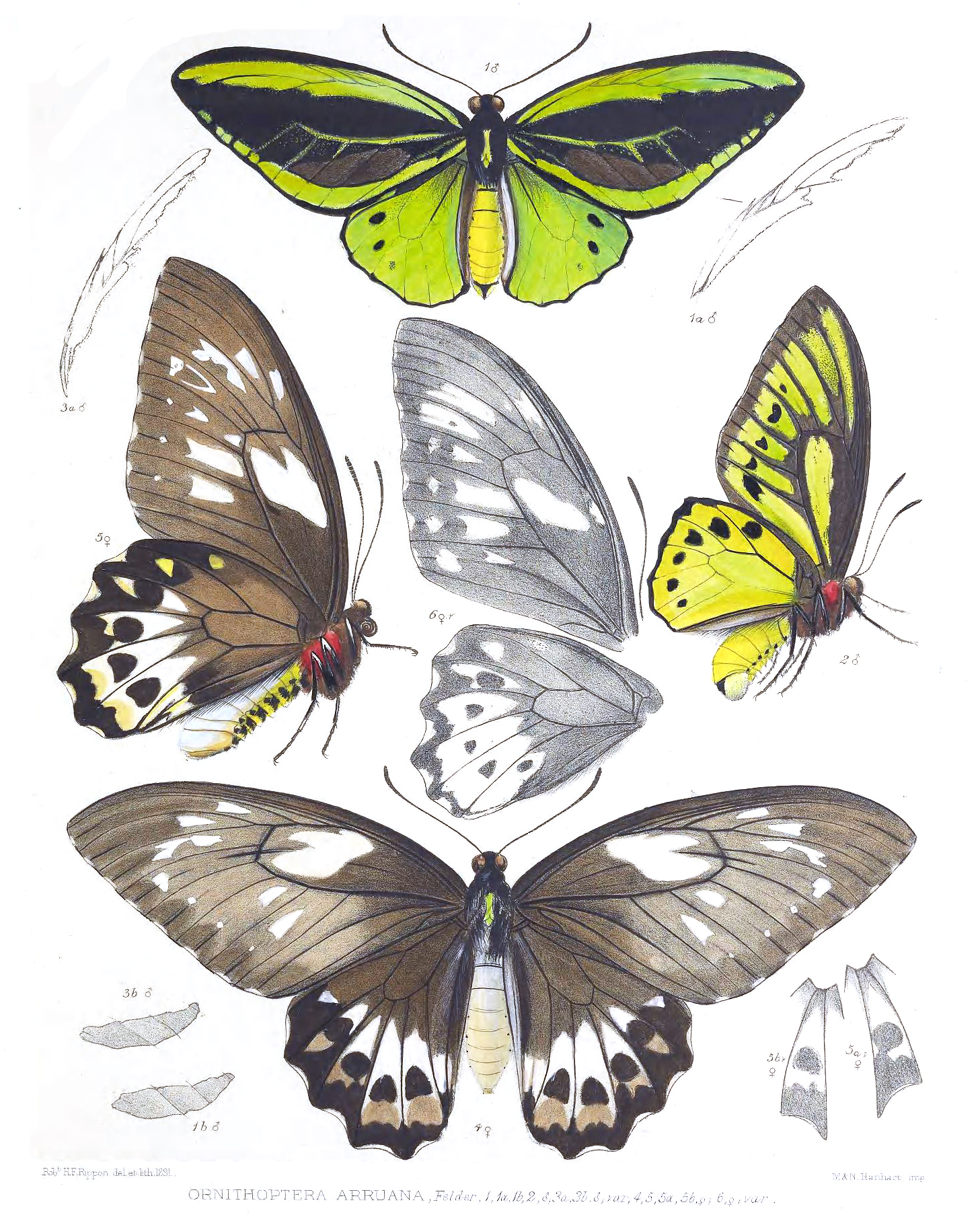
Illustration of O. p. arruana

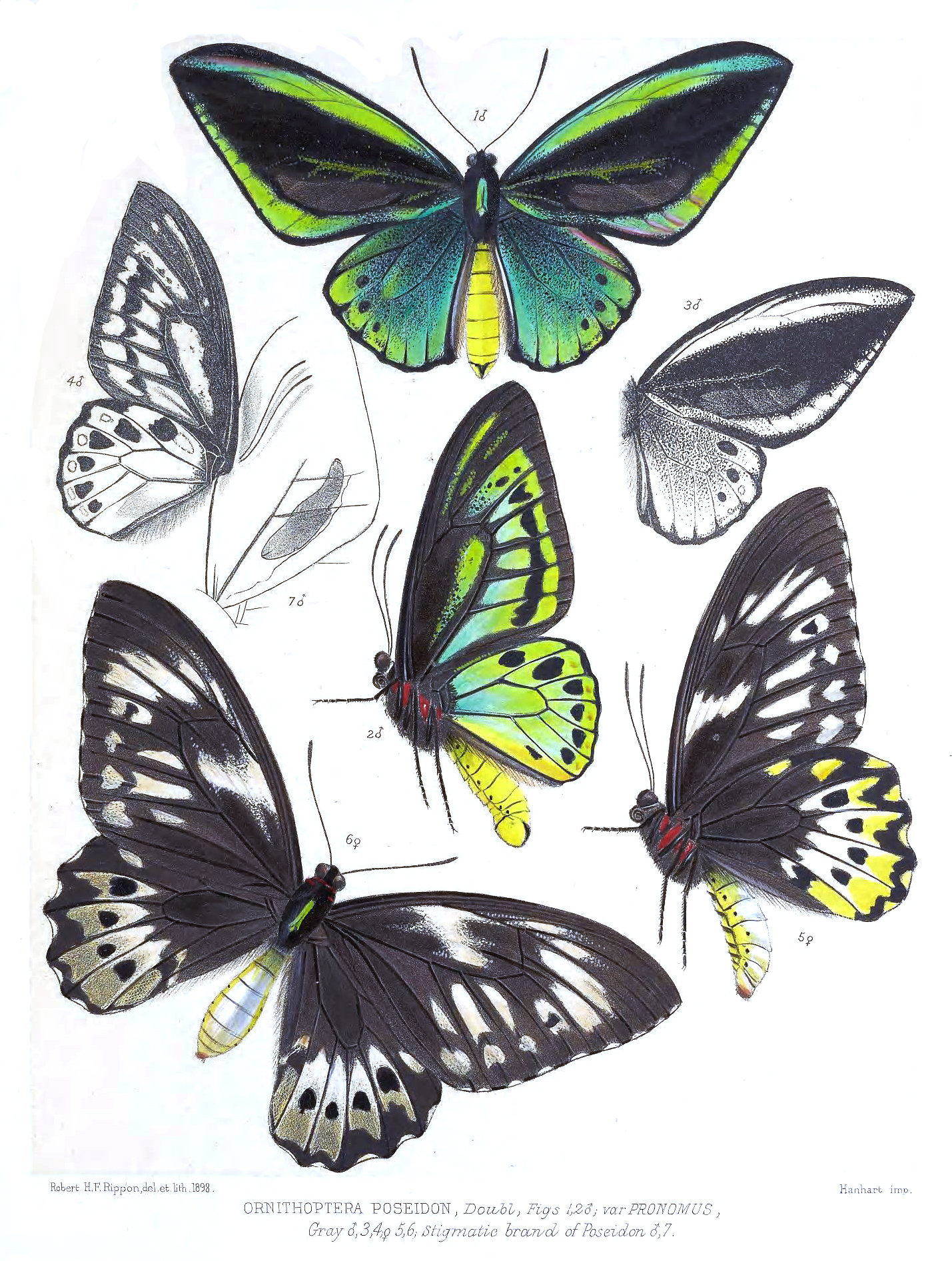
Illustration of O. p. poseidon

- Ornithoptera priamus admiralitatis – Admiralty Islands and nearby smaller islands, Papua New Guinea
- Ornithoptera priamus albiro – Tayandu Islands, Indonesia (may be junior synonym of O. p. hecuba)
- Ornithoptera priamus arruana – Aru Islands, Indonesia
- Ornithoptera priamus aureus – Arfak Mountains of West Papua, Indonesia (may be junior synonym of O. p. poseidon)
- Ornithoptera priamus boisduvali – Woodlark Island, Papua New Guinea
- Ornithoptera priamus bornemanni – New Britain and nearby smaller islands, Papua New Guinea
- Ornithoptera priamus caelestis – Louisiade Archipelago, Papua New Guinea
- Ornithoptera priamus demophanes – D'Entrecasteaux and Trobriand Islands, Papua New Guinea
- Ornithoptera priamus garainaensis – vicinity of Garaina, Papua New Guinea? (may be junior synonym of O. p. poseidon)
- Ornithoptera priamus gebeensis – Gebe Island, Indonesia
- Ornithoptera priamus hecuba – Kai Islands, Indonesia
- Ornithoptera priamus impensis – Manipa Island, Indonesia
- Ornithoptera priamus kassandra – Yapen Island of West Papua, Indonesia
- Ornithoptera priamus macalpinei – Iron and McIlwraith Ranges of Queensland, Australia (may be junior synonym of O. p. poseidon)
- Ornithoptera priamus miokensis – Mioko Island, Papua New Guinea
- Ornithoptera priamus poseidon – New Guinea and northern Torres Strait Islands
- Ornithoptera priamus priamus – Seram, Saparua and Ambon, Indonesia
- Ornithoptera priamus pronomus – southern Torres Strait Islands of Queensland, Australia (may be junior synonym of O. p. poseidon)
- Ornithoptera priamus sterrensis – Mt. Sterren of West Papua, Indonesia (possible junior synonym of O. p. poseidon)
- Ornithoptera priamus teucrus – Biak and Supiori of West Papua, Indonesia
- Ornithoptera priamus wituensis – Vitu Islands, Papua New Guinea (may be junior synonym of O. p. bornemanni)
- Ornithoptera priamus urvillianus – New Ireland and Bougainville, Papua New Guinea, and Solomon Islands

== Conservation ==
Overall this species remains widespread, but some subspecies are threatened by habitat destruction, with those endemic to smaller islands (e.g. O. p. miokensis and O. p. boisduvali) of greatest conservation concern. Like all birdwing butterflies, O. priamus is listed on CITES appendix II, which restricts international export to those in possession of a permit.

== Gallery ==
Selection of museum specimens of Ornithoptera priamus
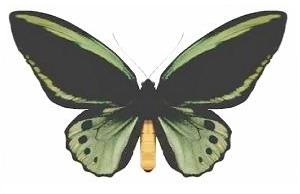
O. p. macalpinei, male

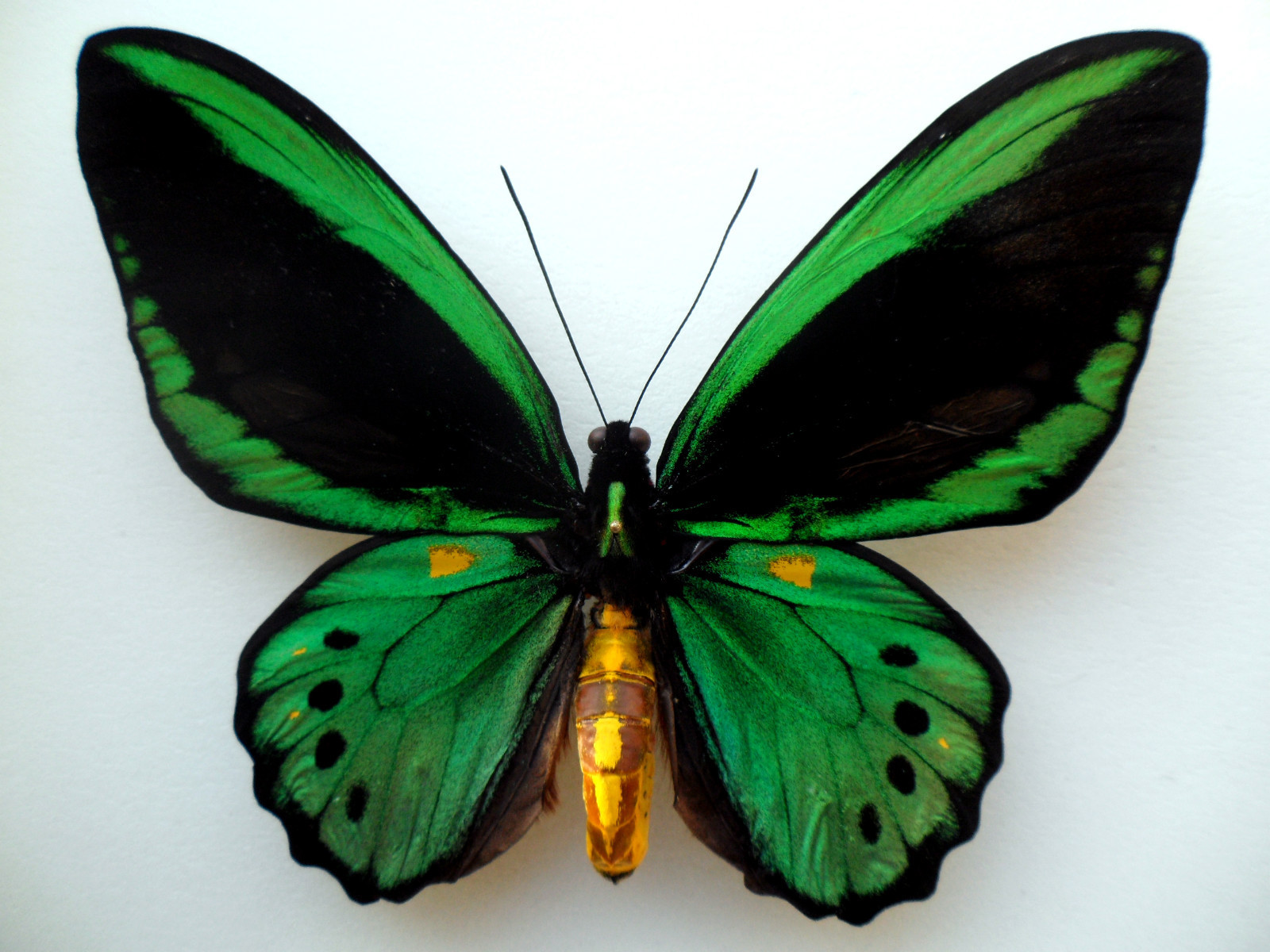
O. p. priamus, male

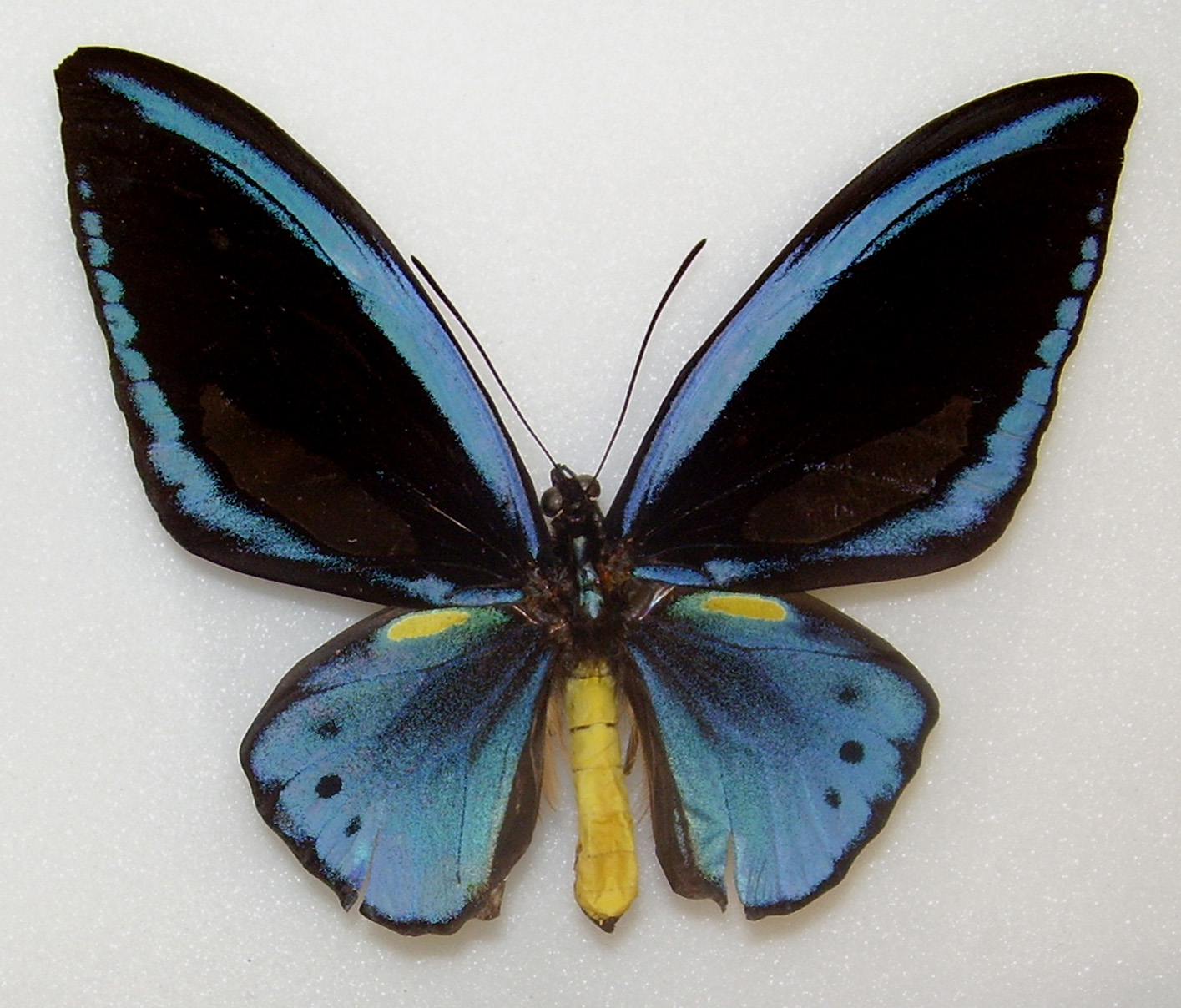
O. p. miokensis, male

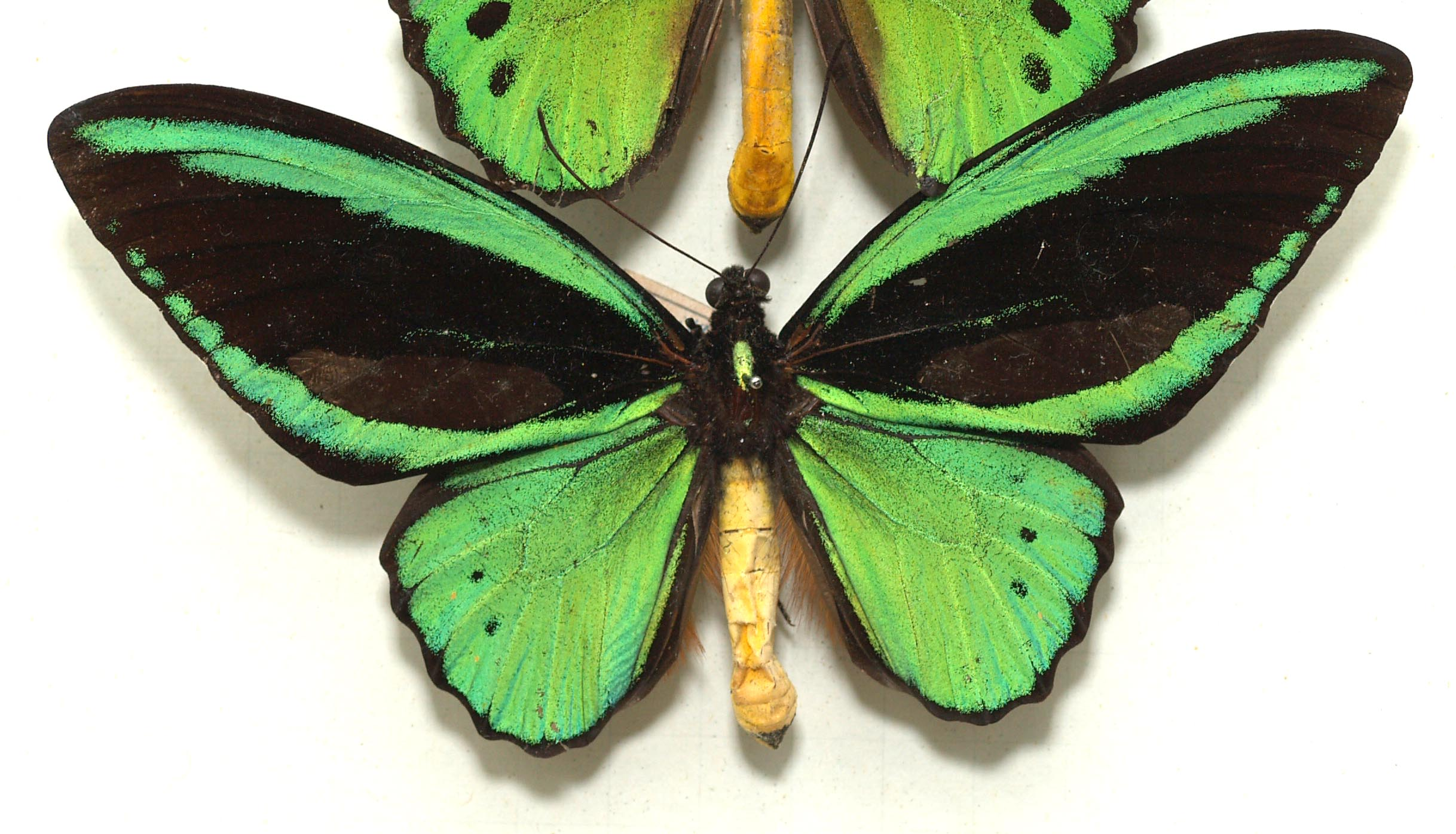
O. p. hecuba, male

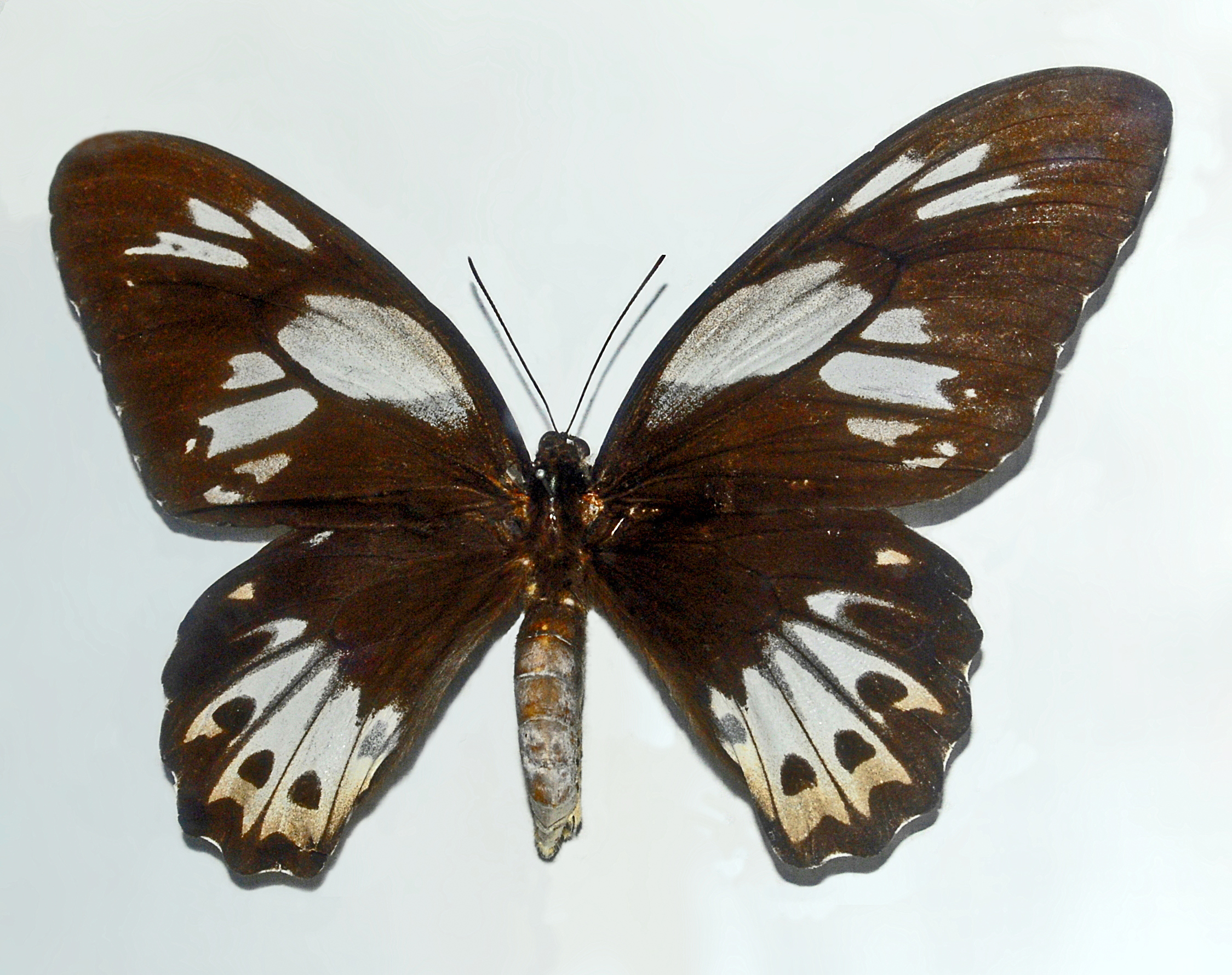
O. p. hecuba, female

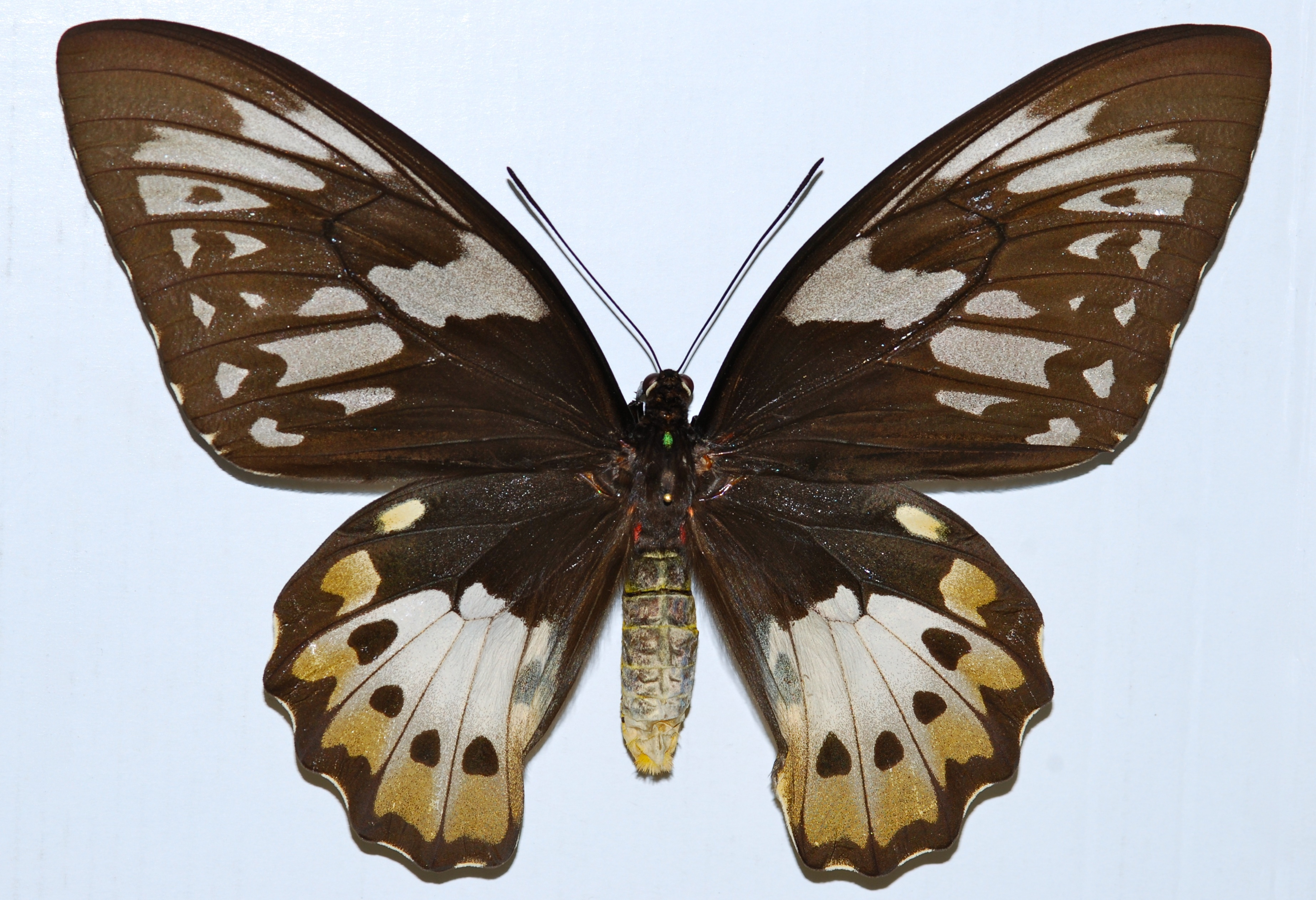
O. p. poseidon, female

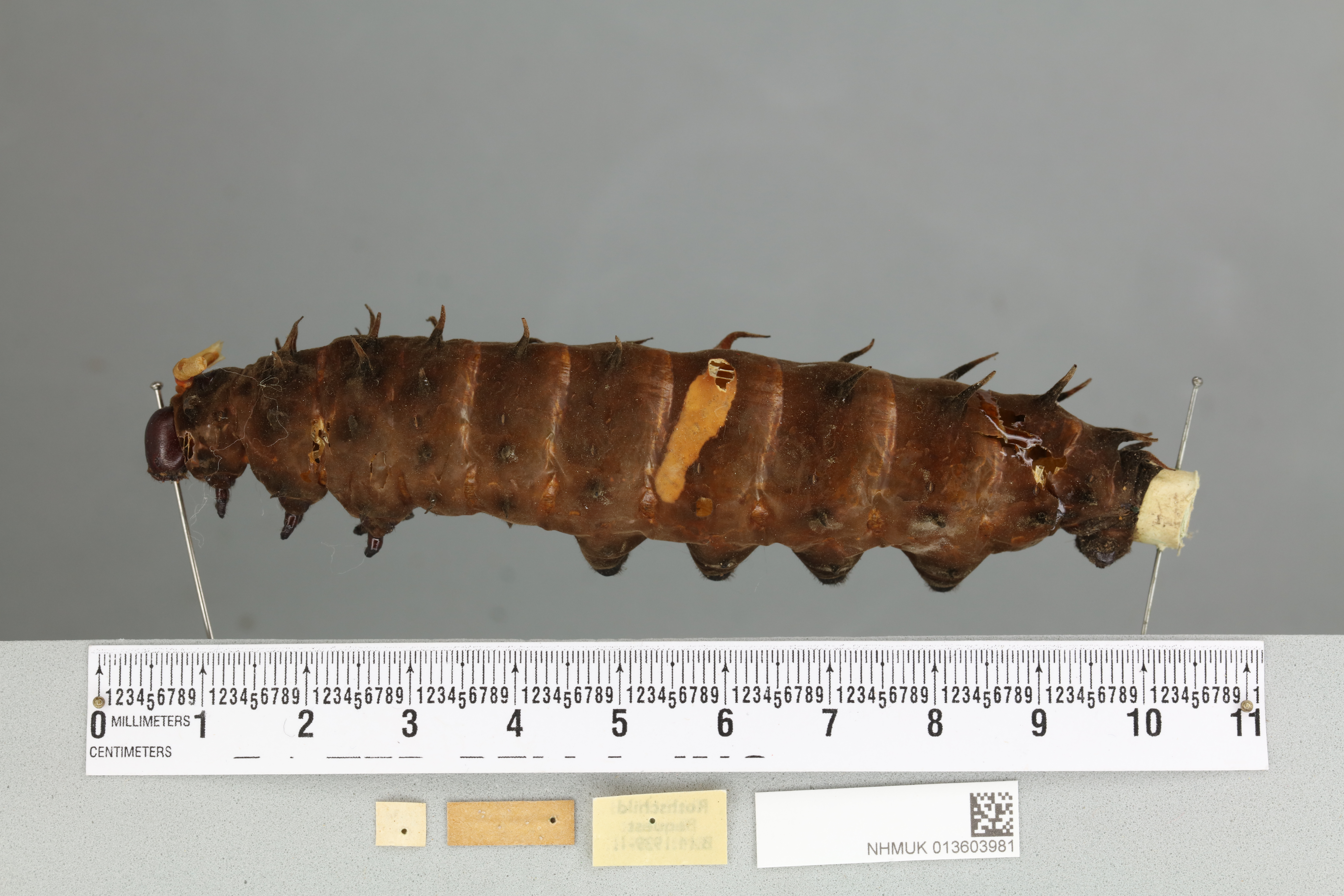
O. p. poseidon, larva

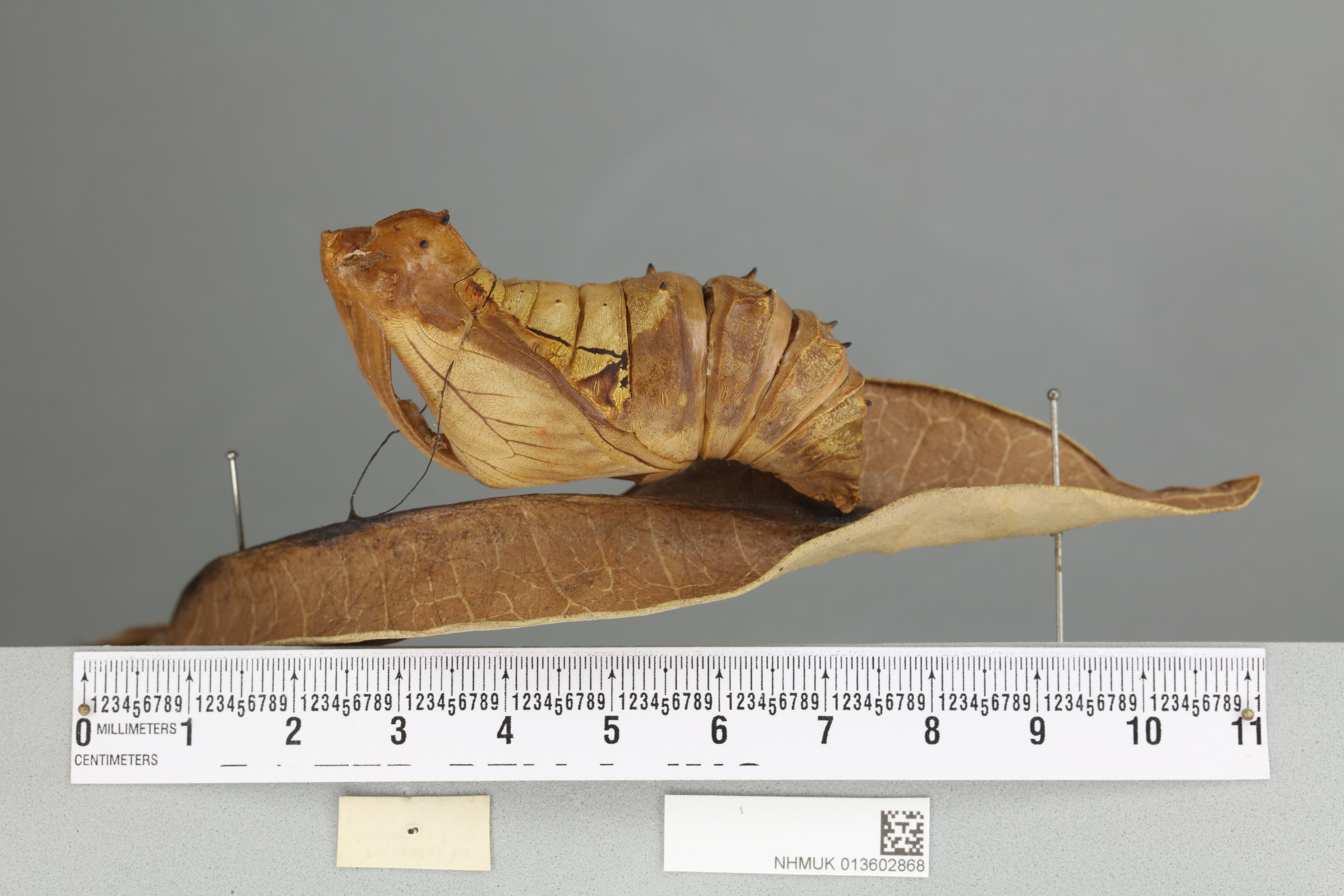
O. p. poseidon, pupa

== Bibliography ==
- D'Abrera, B. (1975). Birdwing Butterflies of the World. Country Life Books, London.
- Collins, N. Mark; Morris, Michael G. (1985). Threatened Swallowtail Butterflies of the World: The IUCN Red Data Book. Gland & Cambridge: IUCN. ISBN 978-2-88032-603-6 – via Biodiversity Heritage Library.
- Haugum, J. & Low, A.M. (1978-1985). A Monograph of the Birdwing Butterflies. 2 volumes. Scandinavian Press, Klampenborg. 663 pp.
- Heidelberger, D.; Heppner, J. B. (1999). "Ornithoptera priamus biology in Queensland, Australia (Lepidoptera: Papilionidae)". Tropical Lepidoptera. 10 (1): 34.
- Von Knötgen, B. (1997) “Ornithoptera: Ornithoptera, Schoenbergia, Aetheoptera”. MGG Verlag, 1997. Parallel text in German, English and French.
- Straatman, R. (1969). Notes on the biology and hostplant associations of Ornithoptera priamus urvilleanus and O. victoriae (Papilionidae) Journal of the Lepidopterists' Society 23:69-76.
