= Crittenton =

Crittenton may refer to:

- Crittenton, Inc., Boston, Massachusetts–based non-profit organization whose mission was to help young people
- Charles Nelson Crittenton (1833–1909), manufacturer and distributor of medicines, Protestant evangelist, philanthropist, co-founder of the National Florence Crittenton Mission
- Javaris Crittenton (born 1987), American former professional basketball player and convicted murderer
- James Crittenton Lucas (1912–1998), American criminal who served a life sentence in Alcatraz

== See also ==
- The National Crittenton Foundation, Portland, Oregon-based American organization
- National Florence Crittenton Mission, organization established in 1883 by Charles N. Crittenton
- Crittenton Women's Union, Boston, Massachusetts–based non-profit organization
- Florence Crittenton Home (disambiguation)
- Crittenden (disambiguation)
- Cruttenden
