= Florence Crittenton Home =

Florence Crittendon Home may refer to:

- Florence Crittenton Home (Little Rock, Arkansas), listed on the NRHP in Arkansas
- Florence Crittenton Home and Maternity Hospital, Sioux City, IA, listed on the NRHP in Iowa
- Florence Crittenton Home (Charleston, South Carolina), listed on the NRHP in South Carolina
- National Florence Crittenton Mission, the organization which established as many as 75 Florence Crittenton Homes
- The National Crittenton Foundation, the current name and form of the organization which established the Homes
- Drury Mansion, a former "Crittenton Home" in Cleveland, Ohio
