= Crittenden =

Crittenden may refer to:

== Places in the United States ==
- Crittenden County, Arkansas
- Crittenden County, Kentucky
  - Crittenden, Kentucky, a city
- Crittenden Township, Champaign County, Illinois
- Crittenden, New York
- Crittenden, Virginia, a community
- Crittenden Bridge, joining Suffolk and Isle of Wight County, Virginia
- Crittenden Farm, a historic farm and ranch in Ashland County, Ohio
- Fort Crittenden, formerly Camp Crittenden, in Arizona
- The Crittenden, a high-rise apartment building in Cleveland, Ohio

== Other uses ==
- Crittenden (surname)
- Crittenden Compromise, a failed compromise to preserve the Union right before the American Civil War
- Partridge v Crittenden, an English legal case of 1968 relevant to the law on offers for sale and invitations to treat
- Crittendens, a chain of grocery stores and liquor outlets in Melbourne, Australia, in the 20th century

== See also ==
- Crittenton (disambiguation)
- Cruttenden
