= Mary Charlton Edholm =

American journalist

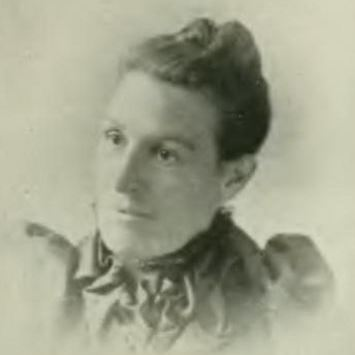
- Mary G. Charlton Edholm, from an 1895 publication
- Born: Mary Grace Charlton; October 28, 1854; Freeport, Illinois, U.S.
- Died: November 29, 1935 (aged 81); Dobbs Ferry, New York, United States
- Education: Monmouth College
- Occupations: Reformer, journalist
- Spouse: Osborn L. Edholm (m. 1878)
- Writing career
- Language: English
- Subject: sex trafficking
- Notable works: The Traffic in Girls and Florence Crittenton Missions
- Literary movement: temperance

Mary Grace Edholm (née Charlton; October 28, 1854 – November 29, 1935) was an American reformer and journalist. She worked as a journalist for twenty years.

Edholm was appointed World's Superintendent of Press work, at the Boston Convention of the Woman's Christian Temperance Union (WCTU) in 1891. Much of her work was along Christian, temperance and philanthropic lines. For many years, her work averaged 250 columns of original material, in which every phase of the labors of the WCTU was depicted in thousands of papers in the English-speaking world.

While editing the booklet, "Around the World with Jesus," by evangelist Charles Nelson Crittenton, she became interested in the rescue work among trafficked girls, and her book entitled The Traffic in Girls and Florence Crittenton Missions was the result. Edholm became so interested in the plight of these betrayed and enslaved girls that she determined to make social purity work her specialty, and continued to speak and write on their behalf.

In 1886, Edholm moved to Oakland, California; by 1893, she was living in Chicago with her only son.

== Early life and education ==
Mary Grace Charlton was born in Freeport, Illinois, October 28, 1854. Her father, James B. Charlton, and her mother, Lucy Gow Charlton, were both writers along reformatory lines, especially the abolition of slavery, the temperance movement, and women's suffrage.

She was educated in public schools through high school. During her sophomore year at Monmouth College, she wrote her exhibition essay on the subject, "Shall our Women Vote?" As a test, she sent it for publication to the Woman's Journal of Boston, and it was published.

== Career ==
After graduating, she contributed articles on women's suffrage and temperance to various periodicals.

She married Osborn L. Edholm, a journalist, in 1878. During her marriage, she developed her love for editorial and reportorial work, and for several years they traveled together extensively. During those years, her descriptive articles appeared in the New York World, the Chicago Tribune, St. Louis Post-Dispatch, Republican, and Chicago Inter Ocean. Both before and after the birth of her children, she wrote continuously.

In 1886, Edholm moved to Oakland, California and was unanimously elected official reporter for the WCTU; in 1891, she was named superintendent of press. Annually, she wrote about 250 columns of original temperance material for over 200 papers, including the dailies of San Francisco, Oakland, Portland, New Orleans, Boston and New York City, as well as The Union Signal and the New York Voice. She conducted three WCTU excursions across the United States. Her promotion came through Frances E. Willard and Lady Henry Somerset. She was a member of the Pacific Coast Women's Press Association.

She served as secretary for the International Federation Women's Press League and was editor of The Christian Home in Oakland.

For years, Edholm was interested in the rescue of trafficked girls and she wrote hundreds of articles in defense of outraged womanhood, in such papers as the Woman's Journal, The Woman's Tribune, and the California Illustrated Magazine, where her articles depicted the horrors of the slave traffic in Chinese women for immoral purposes. In evangelistic meetings in Oakland, she met the millionaire evangelist Florence Crittenton, the founder of Florence Crittenton Missions for the rescue of trafficked girls, and at once entered into descriptive articles of Florence Mission work with such enthusiasm that Crittenton made her reporter of Florence Missions, thus honoring her as a champion of women and widening her field of journalism. In 1895, Edholm was named superintendent of the Crittenton Missions. The horrors of this traffic in girls and their redemption through Florence Missions, Edholm brought out in book form, The Traffic in Girls and Florence Crittenton Missions. She compiled a book of the life of Emily Pitt Stevens, the WCTU Demosthenes and national organizer.

In 1901, Edholm founded the Lucy Charlton Memorial, named after her mother, as a home for unfortunate women and children. For this purpose, she used her own home in Oakland, California and she supported the charity from the proceeds of her lectures and the sale of her book.

She was the Prohibition nominee for State Superintendent of Public Instruction, California, 1902.

== Personal life ==
For years, Mrs. Edholm resided in Oakland, and was active in Rev. Dr. Chapman's Church of that city.

After the end of her marriage to Osborn Edholm, she married mining engineer Frank Sibley.

She died November 29, 1935, in Dobbs Ferry, New York.
