= Florence Crittenton Home (Charleston, South Carolina) =

- Florence Crittendon Home
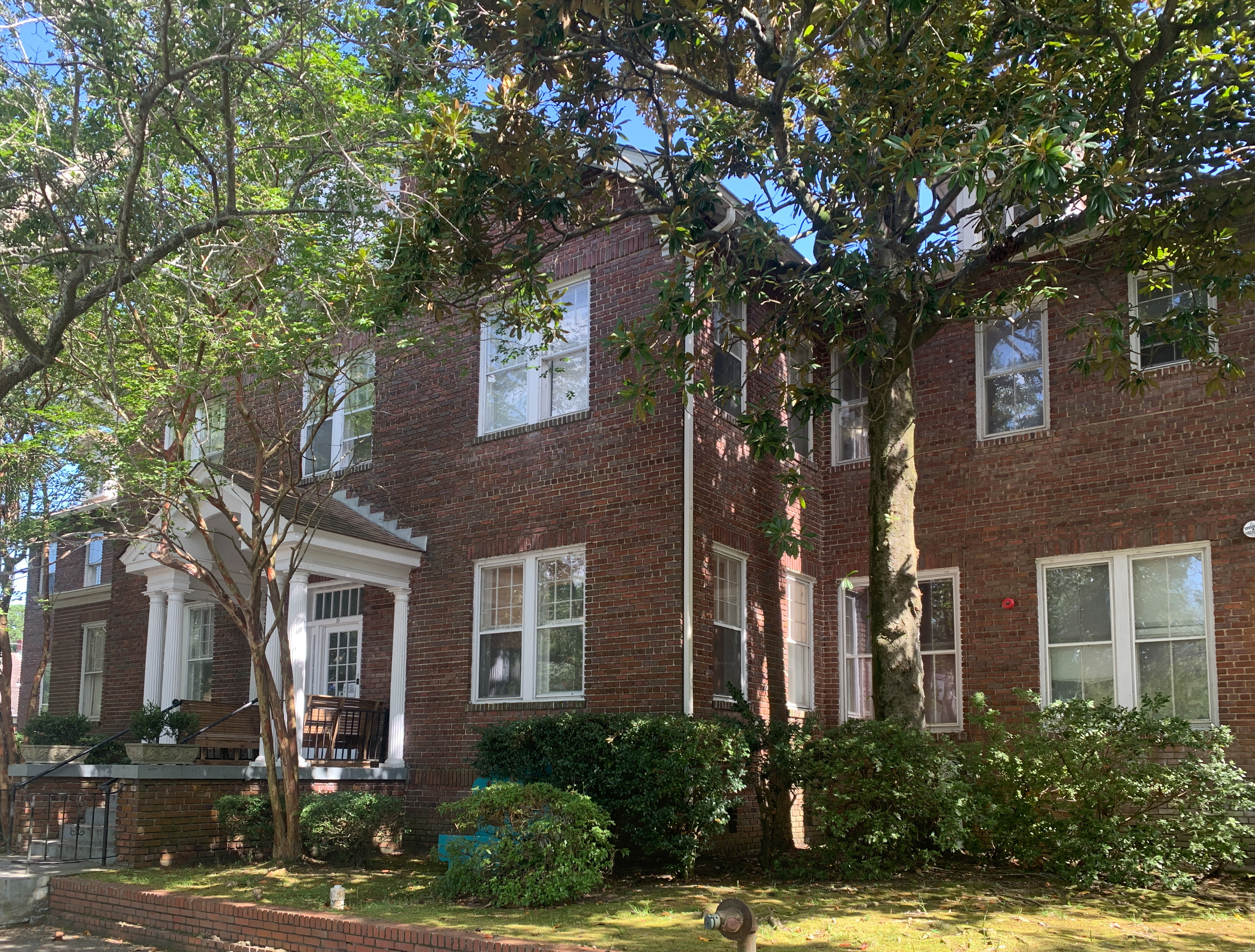
- Florence Crittenton Home

- Location within South Carolina Location within the United States
- Location: 19 St. Margaret St., Charleston, South Carolina
- Nearest city: Charleston, South Carolina
- Coordinates: 32°48′12.708″N 79°57′17.892″W
- Built: 1925-1931
- Architect: John D. Newcomer

The Florence Crittenton Home is an institution for the support of unwed mothers at 19 St. Margaret St. in Charleston, South Carolina that is on the National Register of Historic Places.

== History ==
The first Florence Crittenton Home in Charleston opened on October 3, 1899, at 20 Ashton St. Later it was at 63 Washington St.

In 1925, the Florence Crittenton Home closed because its location at 63 Washington St. was condemned for fire risk. The plans for a new location had already started; L.D. Long Construction Co. was awarded the construction contract for a new building in December 1923. John D. Newcomer was the architect. Claudia Tharin was the leader of the Charleston branch and bought land on St. Margaret St. where she began having a new facility built; she lacked the money for the entire project and paid for new phases of the construction as she raised new money.

== 19 St. Margaret Street location ==
The building housed medical areas and residential areas for the mothers and the staff of the facility. Common rooms, a chapel, a kitchen, a laundry, and a dining room were on the first floor with residential rooms on the second floor. The building finally opened in April 1932—nine years after the facility on Washington St. was forced to close. The building cost $65,000 when it was completed in 1932.

A chapel was dedicated a month after the opening of the Home. In 1964, a new, stand-alone chapel was added in a new building next to the main building.

In 1997, the building was nominated for inclusion on the National Register of Historic Places. In August 1999, a proposal was made to include the Home (along with many other National Register properties outside of the historic district) in the jurisdiction of the Board of Architectural Review. The Charleston Planning Commission approved the rezoning in October 1999. In December 1999, City Council created the Landmark Overlay Zone to protect historic buildings outside the traditional jurisdiction of the Board of Architectural Review and included the Home in the new overlay zone.

== See also ==
- National Register of Historic Places listings in Charleston County, South Carolina
