= Florence Crittenton Home and Maternity Hospital =

- Formerly listed on the U.S. National Register of Historic Places
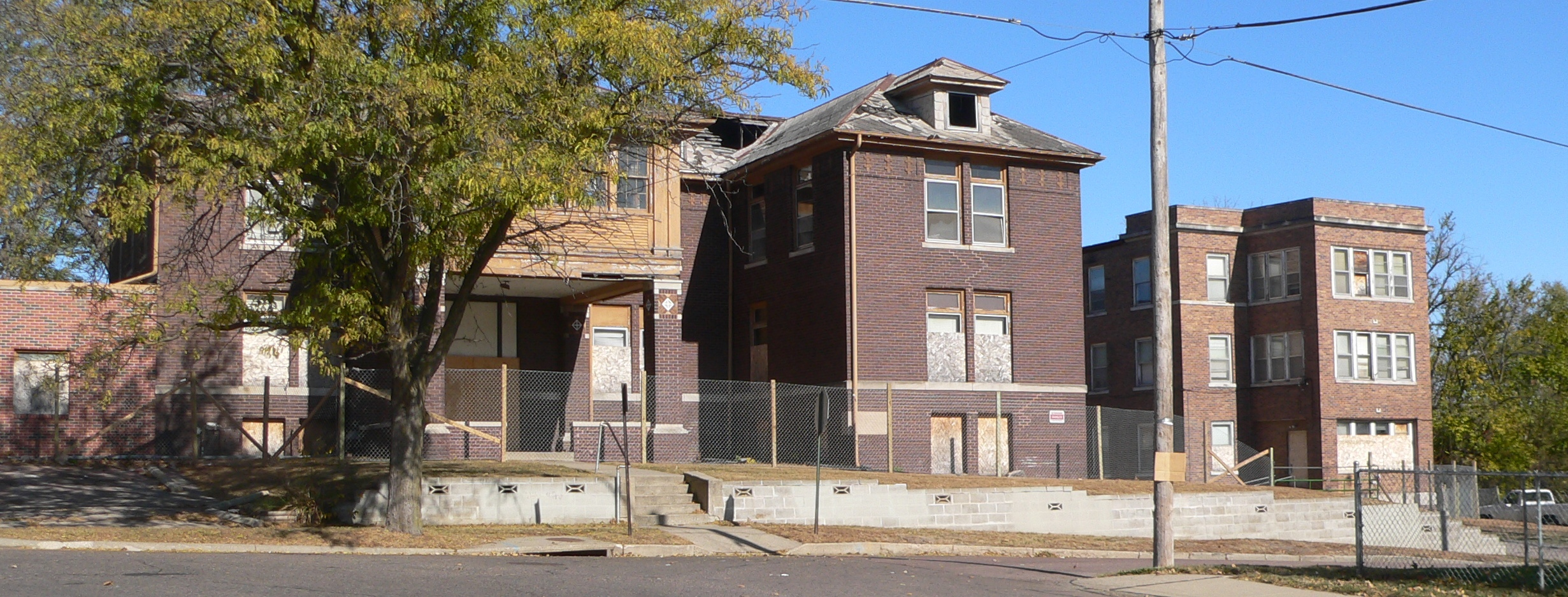

- Location within Iowa Location within the United States
- Location: 1105-1111 28th St. Sioux City, Iowa
- Coordinates: 42°31′10.5″N 96°23′45.4″W
- Area: 1.89 acres (0.76 ha)
- Built: 1906, 1913
- Architect: Beach & Steele; Beuttler & Arnold
- Architectural style: Late 19th and 20th Century Revivals
- NRHP reference No.: 00000306

Significant dates
- Added to NRHP: March 31, 2000
- Removed from NRHP: August 16, 2018

Florence Crittenton Home and Maternity Hospital, also known as Crittenton Center and the Samaritan Retirement Home, were historic buildings located in Sioux City, Iowa, United States.

The Sioux City Women and Babies Home Association was incorporated on October 21, 1897. They began negotiations to join the National Crittenton Foundation in 1903, and incorporated as the Florence Crittenton Home of Sioux City on February 2, 1904. The purpose of the organization was to aid the "friendless, dependent women and girls, and may receive and dispose of babies of deceased fathers or mothers, or those abandoned by them, or those surrendered to this corporation by the order of any judge, court or officer, or legal guardian."

It was the only Crittenton Home in Iowa. Their first order of business was to build the first part of this facility, which was completed in 1906. It was designed by the local architectural firm of Beach & Steele. Up to that time, Sioux City had no maternity hospital; so the services provided by the home were found nowhere else in the city. The maternity hospital was built in 1913. Ralph Arnold served as the architect.

Services changed at the home as society changed. In the early years, many of the young women kept their babies, but adoptions became more prominent by the mid-20th century. The maternity hospital closed in 1928, and Methodist Hospital acquired the building for a dormitory for nursing students. It was converted into the Samaritan Retirement Home in 1949. The Crittenton Center determined the 1906 building no longer served its needs, and they moved to a new facility in 1998. The facility was sold to a developer.

It was listed on the National Register of Historic Places in 2000. The building was empty when it was damaged in a fire in 2009, and it has subsequently been torn down. In 2018 it was delisted from the National Register of Historic Places.
