= Kate Waller Barrett =

American physician

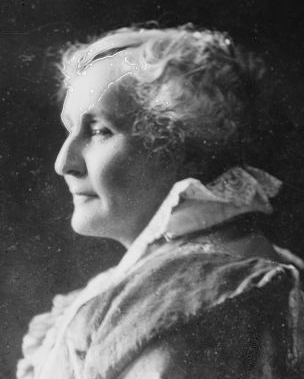
- Born: Katherine Harwood Waller; January 24, 1857; Falmouth, Virginia, U.S.
- Died: February 23, 1925 (aged 68)
- Resting place: Aquia Church, Stafford, Virginia, U.S.
- Education: Women's Medical College of Georgia
- Occupations: Physician; humanitarian; social service leader
- Spouse: Robert South Barrett (m. 1876; died 1896)

Kate Waller Barrett (January 24, 1857 – February 23, 1925), née Katherine Harwood Waller, was a prominent Virginia physician, humanitarian, philanthropist, sociologist and social reformer, best known for her leadership of the National Florence Crittenton Mission, which she founded in 1895 with Charles Nelson Crittenton. Her causes included helping the "outcast woman, the mistreated prisoner, those lacking in educational and social opportunity, the voteless woman, and the disabled war veteran." Although comparatively little known today, she was "[o]ne of the most prominent women of her time".

== Biography ==
Barrett was born Katherine Harwood Waller at her family's historic estate, Clifton, in Widewater, Virginia, to Ann Eliza Stribbling Waller and Withers Waller on January 24, 1857. Her family owned slaves on several large plantations, and Barrett's two young black playmates named Jane and Lucy were "given" to young Kate as a birthday gift on her sixth birthday by her grandmother. Later regretting these circumstances, Barrett stated "I looked upon them as mine by 'divine right' and many were the lessons of cruelty and lack of appreciation of the rights of others cultivated in me."

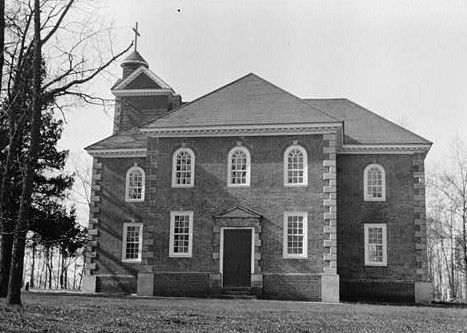
Aquia Church in Stafford, Virginia, was the first and last assignment of the Rev. Dr. Robert South Barrett. He and Kate Waller Barrett are buried in its cemetery.

Katherine Waller attended Arlington Institute for Girls in Alexandria, Virginia, after the Civil War. On July 19, 1876, she married Robert South Barrett (1851–1896), a young Episcopal minister fresh out of seminary, who had been recently assigned to the nearby Aquia Church. It was while traveling with and assisting her husband with his work in Virginia, Kentucky and Georgia, that she first witnessed the social problems which would form the impetus for her life's work.

In particular, soon after Robert South Barrett, Jr., the first of their six children, was born in Richmond, Virginia, a young unmarried woman with her own child begged for help at their door. The Barretts provided the young woman with a meal and listened as she told of being deserted by a man who had promised marriage. Barrett recognized the similarities between herself and the young woman, and concluded that only luck separated her from the young woman in her home; one of them had fallen in love with a "good" man and one with a "bad" one. Furthermore, from her own experiences as a slaveholder and with Jim Crow laws, Barrett also realized how spirits could be broken by degradation. Profoundly moved by her new-found bond with this "fallen" woman, she vowed, "By the power of God that rules the Universe, I would spend my life trying to wipe out some of the inequalities that were meted out to my sisters who were so helpless to help themselves."

== Doctor, mother, widow ==
When Rev. Barrett was assigned to Atlanta in 1886, Katherine Barrett, with his encouragement, pursued a medical degree, while also establishing what came to be her first shelter for unwed mothers. The Women's Medical College of Georgia awarded Barrett an M.D. in 1892 and a doctor of science degree in 1894. Barrett never intended to practice as a physician, but wanted to bolster her credibility: "she recognized that the initials 'M.D.' behind her name gave weight to her viewpoints."

While earning those degrees and working on numerous charitable causes, Barrett also raised six children, with the considerable assistance of a black nanny. Her husband's health, never robust, began failing, and they returned to the Alexandria area while he was assigned in Washington, D.C., and later traveled to Europe to seek cures. Thus, Barrett also studied nursing at the Florence Nightingale Training School in London, England. However, Rev. Barrett died in 1896, leaving his 39-year-old widow with six young children.

== National Florence Crittenton Mission ==
=== Leading Florence Crittenton work ===
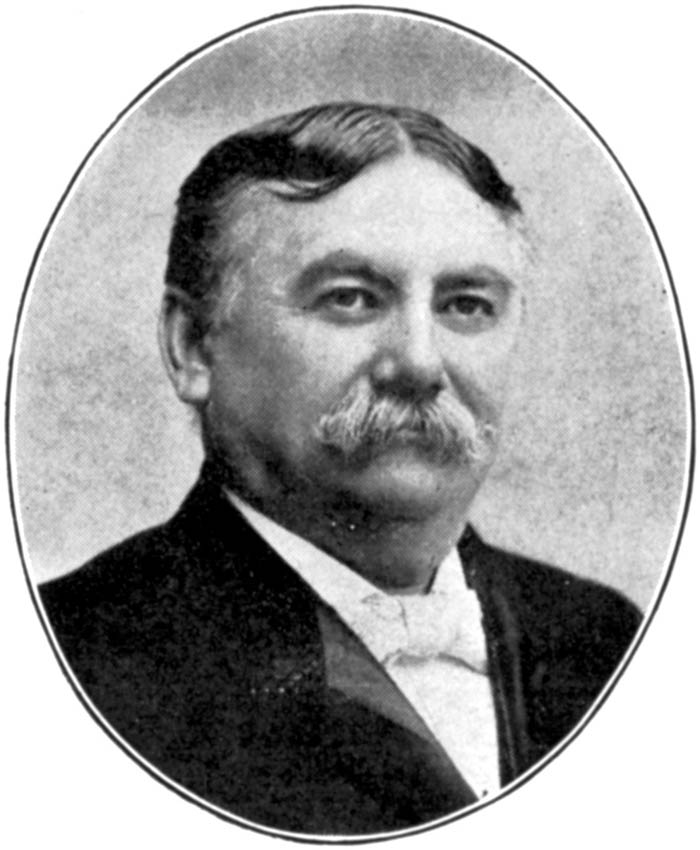
Charles Nelson Crittenton and Dr. Kate Waller Barrett collaborated for 16 years.

Barrett's central interest was the plight of unmarried mothers in the late 19th and early 20th centuries, a group that suffered from national prejudices. After starting a "rescue home" on her own in Atlanta, despite being officially opposed by the local government, she joined forces with Charles Nelson Crittenton (1833–1909), a wealthy New Yorker also interested in creating safe havens for "fallen women."

Crittenton had been establishing rescue homes, primarily oriented toward providing women an alternative to prostitution. He founded the first one in New York City in 1883 following the death of his beloved four-year-old daughter, Florence, after whom he named them. He established others in California and then, in conjunction with the Women's Christian Temperance Union, in various parts of the U.S. However, he confided to Barrett that he feared that isolated homes would collapse after a period of initial enthusiasm.

When Barrett's husband moved the family back to Alexandria, Virginia, she was freed from the daily work of the Atlanta rescue home, and systematically pursued Crittenton's idea for a national association of homes. In 1895, they founded the National Florence Crittenton Mission, with Crittenton as president and Barrett as vice president. Upon the death of her husband on September 12, 1896, Crittenton added general superintendent to Barrett's roles, which she pursued as a single mother of six. Barrett successfully secured for the NFCM the first-ever federal charter for a charitable organization, through a special act of Congress signed by President William McKinley on April 9, 1898.

Upon his death, she succeeded Crittenton as president in 1909, but retained the general superintendent role as well, serving in both positions until she died on February 23, 1925. Operating more than 70 homes around the country and abroad, at the time of her death one-third of all maternity homes in the U.S. were affiliated with the Florence Crittenton chain.

=== Shift in emphasis ===
Although Charles Crittenton's emphasis was on rescuing prostitutes, he agreed with Barrett that unmarried mothers and their children were important. Under Barrett's influence, the emphasis slowly shifted to prioritizing unmarried mothers with a secondary emphasis on prostitutes.

Barrett was instrumental in helping unwed mothers become an acceptable subject of philanthropy. She successfully advocated her social reform views by giving a number of public speeches and publishing a number of articles on the plight of the unwed mother.

Although the NFCM shifted its emphasis from prostitution to unmarried mothers, Barrett led forcefully when the anti-prostitution scare under the label of "white slavery" surfaced around 1910. "When many in the United States were caught up in the white-slavery hysteria, Barrett and the NFCM pushed to help the victims of prostitution rather than to punish them as offenders... NFCM public pronouncements denounced attempts to place the blame for prostitution solely on women".

=== Race and class in Florence Crittenton homes ===
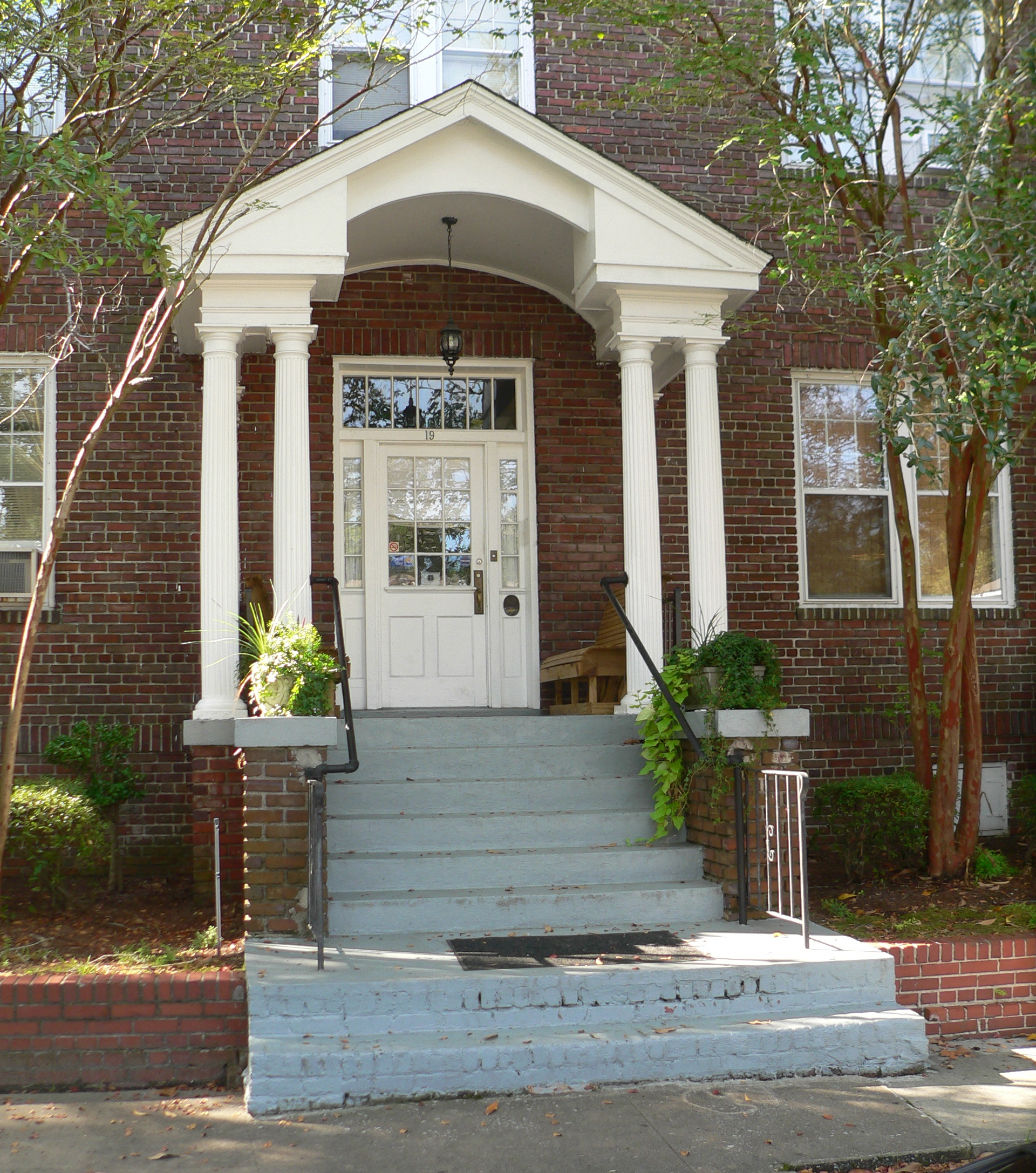
The entrance to the Florence Crittenton Home of Charleston, South Carolina

For a woman born into a slave-holding family, Barrett put considerable effort into addressing the racial issues inherent in the work of the NFCM. Noting Barrett's background and that her era corresponded with the institutionalization of Jim Crow throughout the South, historian Katherine G. Aiken concludes that "[w]ithin this context, the NFCM made pathbreaking overtures to the African American community." Aiken observes that under Barrett, the NFCM operated a "colored mission" in Alexandria, Virginia, with not only its inmates but all of its workers being Black. Similarly, the NFCM welcomed the Topeka Home (Colored), founded by Topeka Blacks in 1904, when they later petitioned to join NFCM. Not only did Barrett accept the Topeka home, but she arranged for the NFCM to pay off the home's sizeable remaining mortgage, and ensured that its leader, Sarah Malone, was included within the NFCM leadership.

Barrett fostered important relationships with African American women.... At a time when few white organizations interacted with black women, Barrett facilitated the efforts of middle-class African American women to engage in rescue and maternity home work... The FC approach was neither revolutionary nor radical, and both white and black Crittenton workers failed to confront or challenge predominant views of race. At the same time, the Crittenton organization made inroads against racism that deserve to be recognized.

Barrett was perhaps less successful in leading Florence Crittenton workers on the class divisions that crept into their work. While unwed mothers were hardly restricted at the time to the working class, middle-class and wealthy women had access to resources that could shield them from censure. As a result, Florence Crittenton work has been characterized as mostly middle-class people "meddling" in working class lives "in an effort to bring about a well-ordered society." Katherine Aiken thinks this characterization is too sweeping and that it misses the genuine caring that Florence Crittenton workers brought to their work, identifying as women and mothers with their sister "unfortunate girls". Aiken summarizes her conclusions by agreeing with critics that "middle-class Crittenton workers sometimes forced their own values and life-style upon women of another class... [and] [t]hese actions sometimes resulted in negative effects on the women involved. Nevertheless, Crittenton homes served a purpose and filled a void that provided a real service to women enduring considerable personal turmoil."

=== Maternity hospitals ===
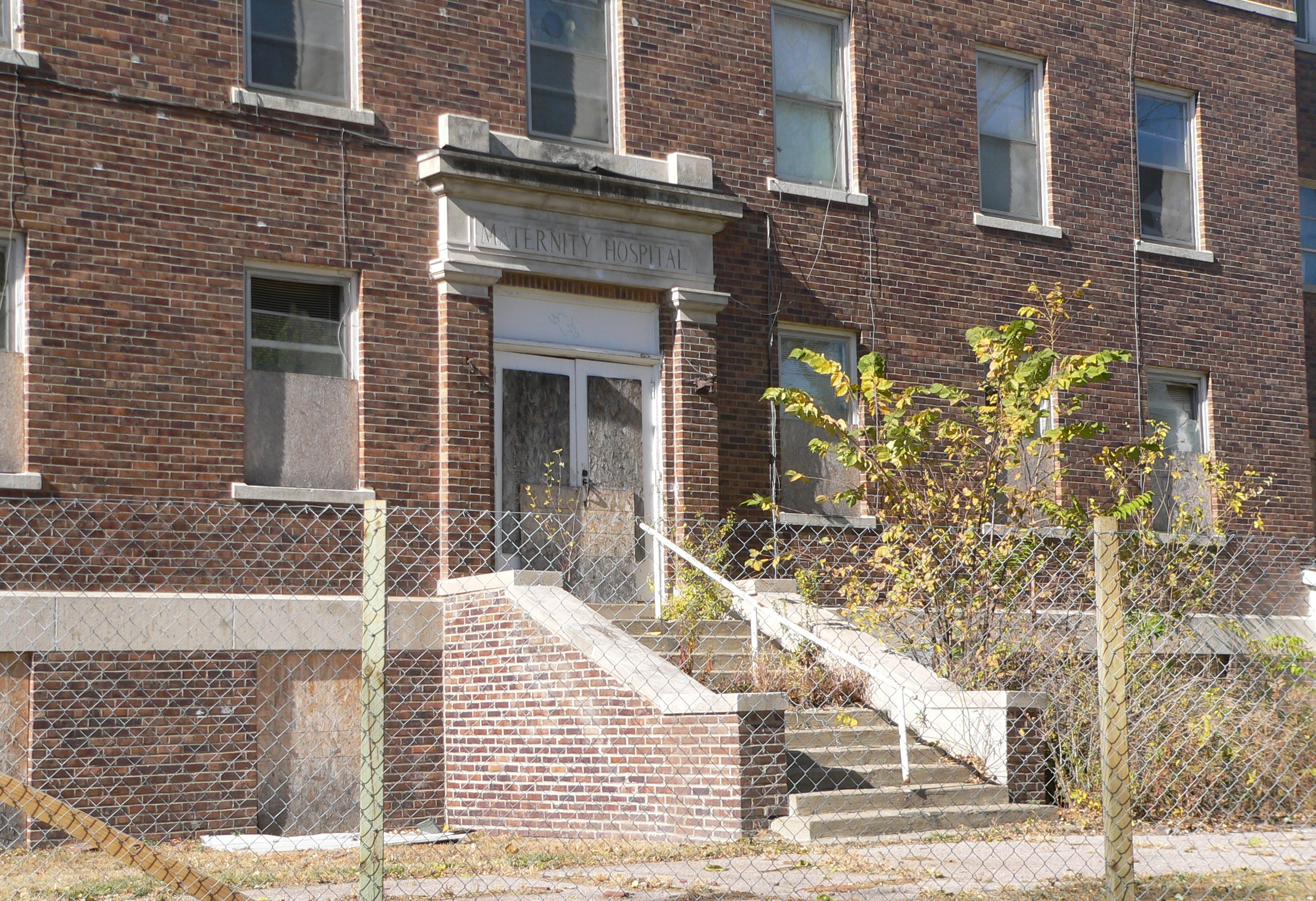
Now abandoned, the Florence Crittenton Maternity Hospital of Sioux City, Iowa was state of the art when built in 1913 next to the Florence Crittenton Home.

Finding the treatment of women in regular hospitals to be unsatisfactory, many Florence Crittenton homes came to build their own. For example, the Florence Crittenton Home in Sioux City, Iowa included hospital care in its original 1906 building, and then built an entire hospital next door in 1913. Like most Crittenton hospitals, it featured primarily female staff and welcomed all women (not just home inmates) to use it. The fees charged to middle-class patients helped pay for the care for the home residents. "This combination of modern facilities, sympathetic care, and an atmosphere that was conducive to women exercising control over their own treatment caused many women to select Crittenton hospitals over other alternatives, and probably speeded the transition from home births to hospital births in some locations."

=== Children as successors ===
Two of Barrett's offspring led the National Florence Crittenton Mission after her. With duties split in the same way that Charles Crittenton and she had functioned early on, her eldest son Robert South Barrett, Jr. (the little boy she had once mentally compared to the child of the unmarried mother at the door all those years ago) served as her successor as NFCM president, while daughter Reba Barrett Smith served as vice president and general superintendent.

== Other activities ==
=== Political activism ===
Katherine Barrett was a charter member and vice president of the League of Women Voters, and a motivating force behind the creation of the American Legion Auxiliary. Barrett also held offices in a number of political organizations including:

- Vice President of the Equal Suffrage League of Virginia (1909–1920)
- President of the National Council of Women (1911–1916)
- the first Virginia State President, American Legion Auxiliary
- President, American Legion Auxiliary (1922–1923)
- Vice President of the Conference of Charities and Corrections of Virginia

She was also active in the National Congress of Mothers, the Parent-Teacher Association, the Woman's Christian Temperance Union, Daughters of the King, Episcopal Church, The National League of Social Services, and the Commission on Training Camp Activities.

After her speech at the Democratic National Convention received a standing ovation, she was asked to consider running for Governor of Virginia. Although flattered, she did not pursue the idea due to her declining health.

=== Delegacy ===
Barrett was commissioned to be a delegate for many causes, both social and political. In 1914, Barrett traveled to Europe on a U.S. battleship, where she was:

- A Special Representative of the U.S. Government in Europe studying and advising on women's issues for the Bureau of Immigration, 1914–1919
- One of only 10 women to attend the Versailles Conference in 1919
- A delegate to the Zurich Peace Conference in 1919

Back in the United States, she was:

- A delegate to the 1924 Democratic National Convention
- A delegate to the Conference for the Care of Delinquent Children
- A delegate to the International Council of Women

=== Daughter of the American Revolution and preservationist ===
A resident of Alexandria, Virginia, for approximately 30 years until her death, Barrett was aware that she lived in the house where Richard Bland Lee had drafted the document establishing the District of Columbia. It had been owned by Elisha C. Dick, one of the physicians attending George Washington on his deathbed as well as a noted abolitionist and early mayor of Alexandria.

Barrett joined the Daughters of the American Revolution in 1904, as a member of the Mount Vernon Chapter. In 1919, she was elected State Regent of the Virginia Society of the Daughters of the American Revolution, an office she held until her death.

On February 21, 1925, Barrett held an organizing meeting in her home for what became the Alexandria/Arlington chapter. Upon Barrett's unexpected death two days later, the new chapter changed its name to the Kate Waller Barrett Chapter in her honor.

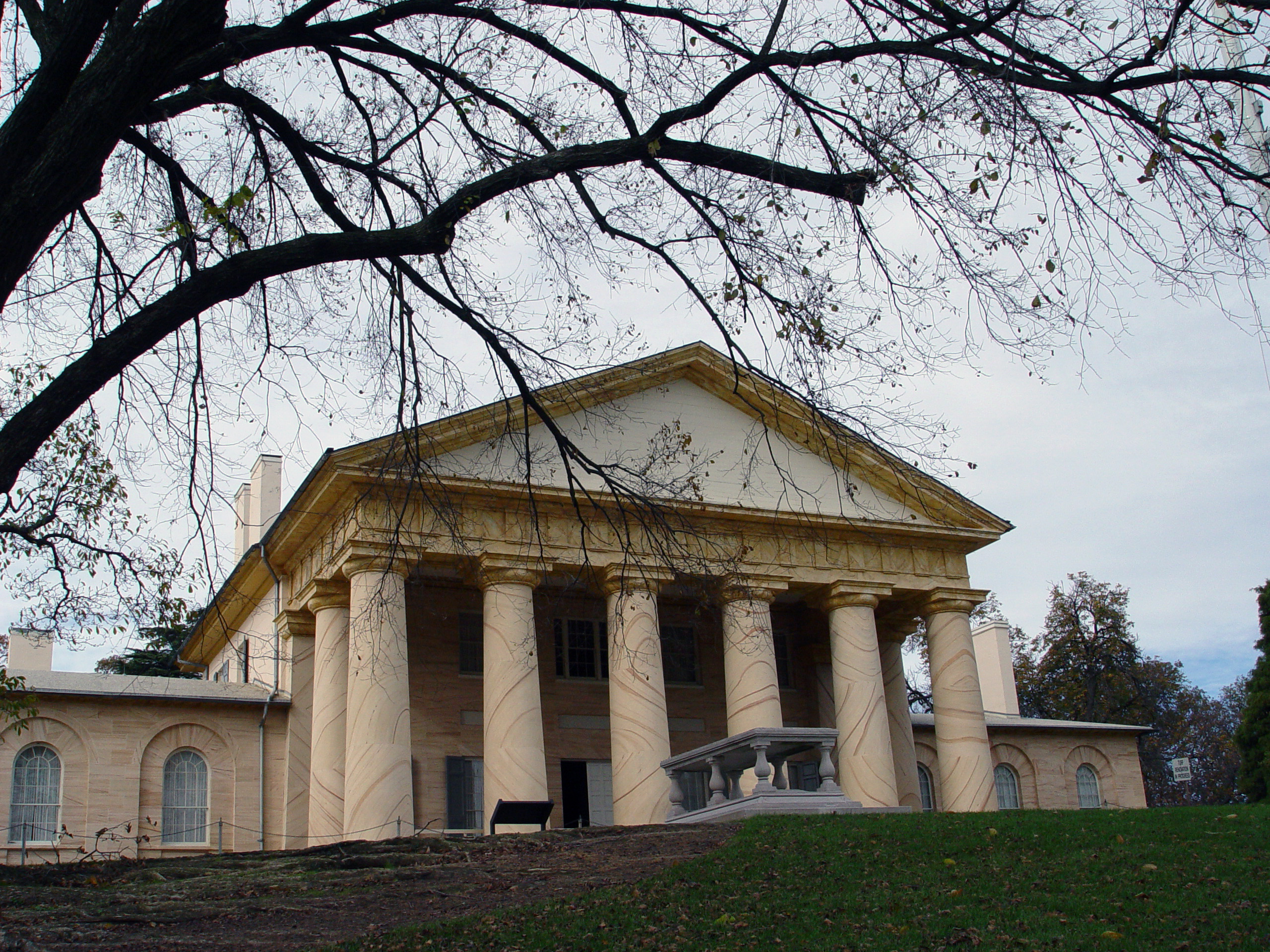

Barrett was active in the preservation or improvement of several other local historic buildings and sites, including Arlington National Cemetery, and Custis-Lee Mansion, home of Robert E. Lee. Barrett also championed the creation of a Shenandoah National Park. Thus, the Alexandria public library branch holding the local history collection (since 1937) is named in her honor.

== Honors ==
When Barrett died on February 23, 1925, the flag over the Virginia Capitol in Richmond was flown at half-staff. She was the first woman in the history of the commonwealth to be so honored. In 2006, the Library of Virginia honored Barrett as one of the Virginia Women in History.

Barrett served on the Board of Visitors of the College of William and Mary in Williamsburg, Virginia, and was the first woman to be made an honorary member of their Phi Beta Kappa chapter. A dormitory has also been named for her.

In Virginia, three institutions are named after her:

- Kate Waller Barrett Elementary School of Stafford County
- Kate Waller Barrett Elementary School of Arlington County
- Kate Waller Barrett Branch Library in Alexandria

== Legacy ==
Barrett had a tremendous impact on the developing field of social work and on services for women and children.

Under her leadership, the NFCM became an established social service organization that provided a wide spectrum of services to women. The mission initiated activities that many now consider essential services for women and children. Florence Crittenton homes pioneered women-oriented policies in the areas of health care, employment for women, and children's rights. The organization campaigned for equality for women and for recognition of women's needs... Despite differences in class and race with most of their clients, FC volunteers tried to emphasize gender identity.... It would be a long time before a group of women had the resources to duplicate Crittenton efforts.

Insisting that all mothers had something to say and a right to act, Barrett also successfully led large numbers of women to push the boundaries of what was acceptable for women to pursue. Historian Katherine Aiken finds Barrett's current relatively small profile illuminating. "One of the most prominent women of her time, Kate Waller Barrett is today a virtually unknown historical character." Aiken notes that popular culture and historians have focused on female activists and social scientists "who tended to be single, career women. Certainly, as a physician and trained nurse, Barrett's professional status was on par with any progressive reformer, male or female. However, unlike many of her contemporaries, Barrett relied on her role as wife and mother to establish her credentials.... Recent studies of maternalism have made it clear that middle-class women often used the rhetoric of motherhood to make inroads toward achieving changes favorable to women. Barrett and the NFCM illustrate this phenomenon".

Educator and social worker Janie Porter Barrett (1865–1948), although unrelated to Barrett, advocated many of the same voting rights and women's empowerment causes within black communities in Atlanta and Virginia, within Barrett's lifetime and afterward.
