= The National Crittenton Foundation =

National Crittenton is a Portland, Oregon-based American organization that works with at-risk and criminal justice system-involved girls, young women and their families. The foundation is affiliated with 25 member agencies operating across the country in urban and rural areas, including Baltimore; Boston; Charleston, South Carolina; Denver, Colorado; Kansas City, Missouri; Knoxville, Tennessee; Orange County, California and Los Angeles, California; Peoria, Illinois; Philadelphia; Phoenix, Arizona, San Francisco, California; Sioux City, Iowa; Washington, D.C., and Wheeling, West Virginia.

National Crittenton's roots are in the social movement created by New York evangelist and millionaire Charles Nelson Crittenton, who founded the Florence Crittenton Night Mission in 1883 in New York City. This "Mother Mission" was dedicated to serving only young women and girls, most of whom were involved in prostitution or were single mothers. The Night Mission was later called the National Florence Crittenton Mission after more homes were opened. At one point, more than 76 "Crittenton Homes" served young women and girls, many of whom were pregnant or single mothers.

In 1893, Charles Crittenton was joined in the movement by pioneering female physician Dr. Kate Waller Barrett. Barrett was famous for her progressive ideas about education and training for women and her tireless advocacy for girls, women and their families.

In 2021, National Crittenton is celebrating its 137th year of continuous service to young women and girls. Its priority is to support the empowerment, self-sufficiency, and end of cycles of destructive behaviors and relationships for at-risk and system-involved girls, young women and their families.

== See also ==
- Florence Crittenton Home
