= Florence Crittenton Home (Little Rock, Arkansas) =

Historic house in Arkansas, United States

- U.S. National Register of Historic Places
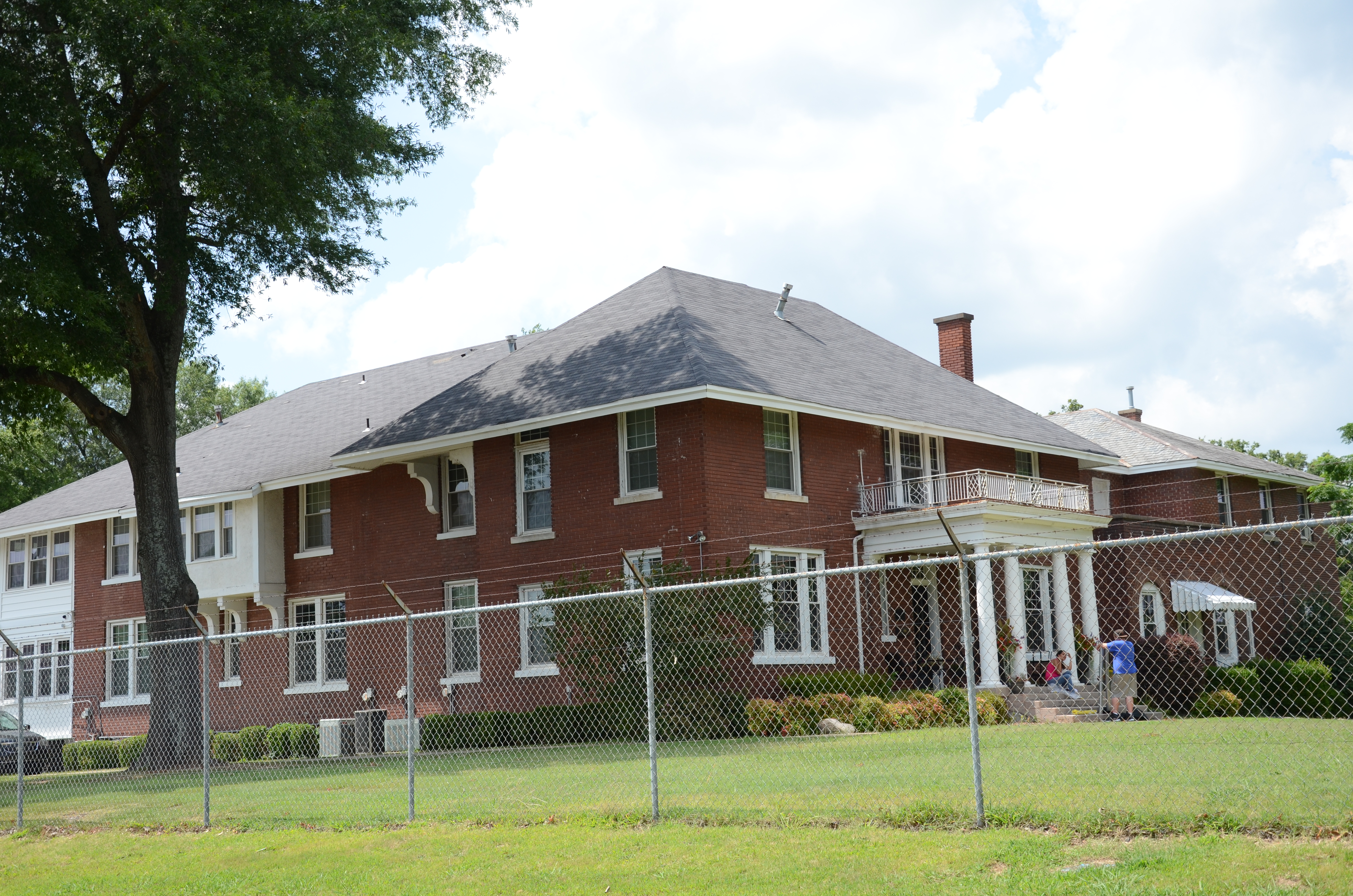

- Location within Arkansas Location within the United States
- Location: 3600 W. 11th St., Little Rock, Arkansas
- Coordinates: 34°44′30″N 92°18′53″W
- Area: less than one acre
- Built: 1917
- Architect: Thompson & Harding
- Architectural style: Colonial Revival
- MPS: Thompson, Charles L., Design Collection TR
- NRHP reference No.: 82000891
- Added to NRHP: December 22, 1982

The Florence Crittenton Home is a historic house at 3600 West 11th Street in Little Rock, Arkansas. Its main block is a two-story brick hip-roof structure, to which similarly styled ells have been added to the right and rear. Its front facade is symmetrical, with a central entrance sheltered by a Colonial Revival portico supported by grouped columns and topped by a painted iron railing. The house was built in 1917 to a design by the architectural firm Thompson & Harding.

The house was listed on the National Register of Historic Places in 1982.

== See also ==
- National Register of Historic Places listings in Little Rock, Arkansas
