= Roger Cruttenden =

English cricketer (born 1944)

Roger Cruttenden (born 5 October 1944) is an English former cricketer. He was a right-handed batsman and a right-arm medium-fast bowler who played for Berkshire. He was born in Hastings.

Cruttenden made two appearances for Kent Second XI between 1967 and 1968, though he played no further cricket for seven years.

Cruttenden's sole List A appearance came during the 1979 Gillette Cup competition, against Durham. Crutenden scored 26 not out in the innings, Berkshire's second highest score of the match, and took figures of 1-52.

Cruttenden continued to play for Berkshire in the Minor Counties Championship throughout 1979.
