= The Crittenden =

Crittenden Court Apartments
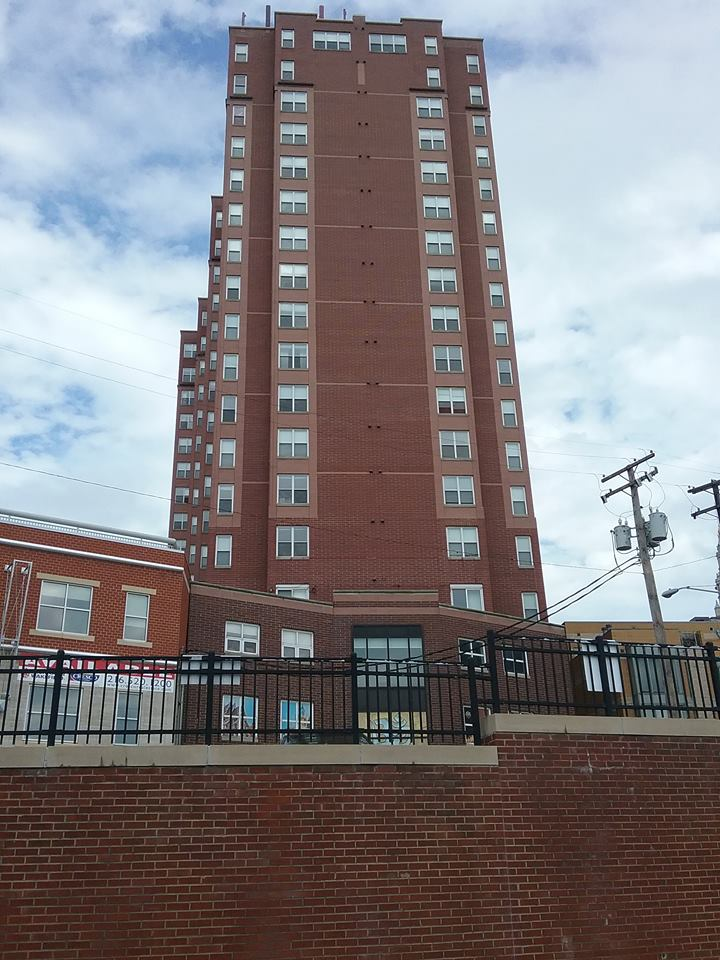
- The Crittenden sits on the hillside towards the Flats
- Interactive map of the Crittenden Court Apartments area
- Former names: None

General information
- Type: Residential
- Location: 955 West St. Clair Avenue Cleveland, Ohio 44113 United States
- Coordinates: 41.498°N 81.70097°W
- Construction started: 1994
- Completed: 1996

Height
- Roof: 59.43 m (195 ft)

Technical details
- Floor count: 17

Design and construction
- Architect: Richard L. Bowen & Associates

Website
- http://www.rlba.com/

The Crittenden is a 195 foot 17-story high rise solid apartment building in The Flats of downtown Cleveland located on St. Clair Avenue. The building is notable for being one of the tallest inhabited masonry loadbearing structures in the entire world. The entire superstructure is made of brick and it is unusual among high rises as it is widely believed it is not possible to make tall structures completely out of brick. Despite the skinny profile of the Crittenden, it is actually quite wide with a seemingly endless expanse. The building was designed by Richard L. Bowen & Associates, a Cleveland architecture firm that is responsible for bringing architecture, engineering, and construction services under one company as opposed to many. It is also the tallest all-residential structure in the flats and the Warehouse District. It was also one of the first residential towers constructed in the Warehouse District.

The Crittenden rests along the side of the hill that leads from the Warehouse District down to the flats area. The entrance stands nestled in the side of the descending hill and the entire structure appears to hover over the hill. The apartment building is owned by Crittenden Court Apartments and features both pet friendly and lower rent studio apartments.

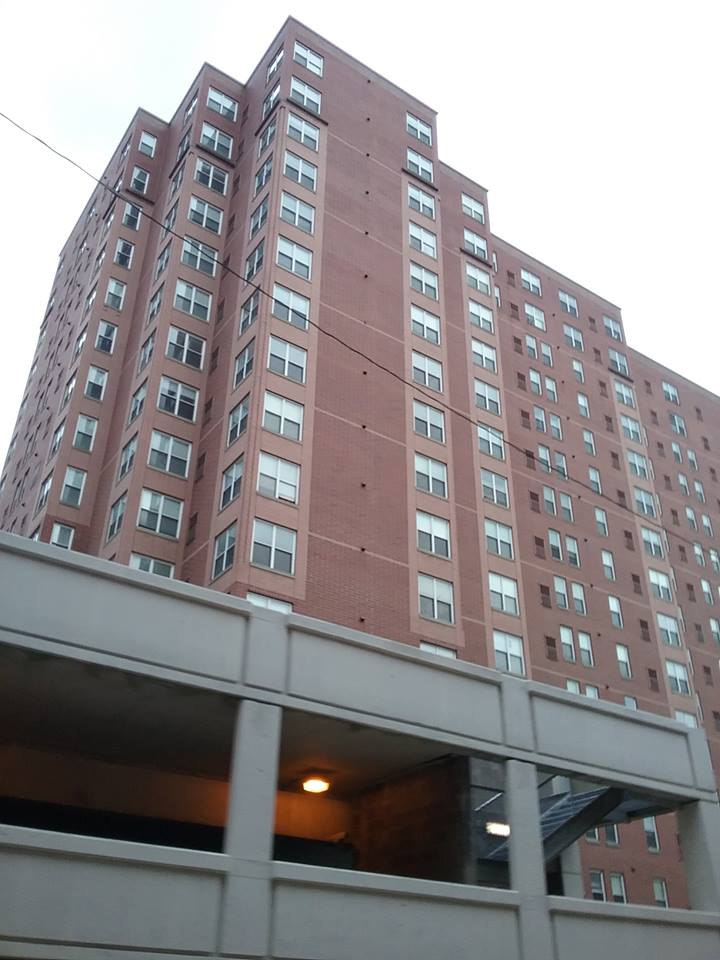
The Crittenden from West St. Clair
