= John Darlington Newcomer =

American architect (1867-1931)

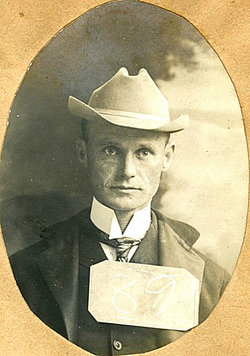
- John Newcomer was known as the "dean of Charleston architects" for his extensive practice during the early 20th century
- Born: August 23, 1867; Shippensburg, Pennsylvania
- Died: December 30, 1931 (aged 64); Charleston, South Carolina
- Occupation: Architect
- Known for: Charleston architecture

John Darlington Newcomer (August 23, 1867 — June 12, 1931) was an American architect whose practice focused on Charleston, South Carolina in the early 20th century.

== Life ==
Newcomer was born on August 23, 1867, in Shippensburg, Pennsylvania, to Abram Newcomer, of Swiss-English ancestry, and Sarah Darlington, of English ancestry. He was educated at an architecture school in Kansas and also at Cornell University. After about fifteen years as an architect for the federal government, Newcomer settled in Charleston, South Carolina in about 1906. He married Marie Anna Hacker.

At the time of his death on December 30, 1931, in Charleston, South Carolina, he was called the "dean of Charleston architects." He is buried at Magnolia Cemetery, Charleston, South Carolina.

Notable projects of his include the following:

- C.D. Franke warehouses and offices (1908) (177 Church St.)
- 332 King St. (1909) (expansion and remodel)
- 334 King St. (1909) (expansion and remodel)
- 166 1/2 Wentworth St. (1909)
- 198 Calhoun St. (1909) (no longer extant)
- 156 Wentworth St. (1910) (alterations and addition)
- R.A. Kinloch Home for Nurses (1910) (Calhoun St.)
- G.G. Creighton Residence, 52 Rutledge Avenue (1912)
- Bethel Methodist Episcopal Sunday school (1912) (55 Pitt St.)
- Baker Sanatorium (1912) (55 Ashley Ave.)
- Liberty & Citizens' Bank (1914) (253 King St.)
- 209 Meeting St., Charleston (1914)
- 213 Meeting St., Charleston (1914)
- Memorial Baptist Church (1915) (981 King St.)
- The St. Margaret's Home (10 St. Margaret St.)
- Sottile-Cadillac Co. garage (255-263 Meeting St.) (1919)
- St. Peter's Protestant Episcopal Church and rectory (570 Rutledge Ave.)
- J.M. Connelley Memorial Chapel (313 Meeting St.)
- South Atlantic Mortgage Co. building, 71 Broad St. (1929)
- Dr. J. Sumter Rhame house (1931) (65 South Battery)
- St. Paul's school, Meggett, South Carolina
- Atlantic National Bank (515 King St.)
- Evening Post building (134 Meeting St.) (destroyed in fire in 1979)
- 807 Rutledge Ave., Charleston
- Warren Halsey Dunning house (419 W. Carolina Ave. Summerville, SC)

== Gallery ==
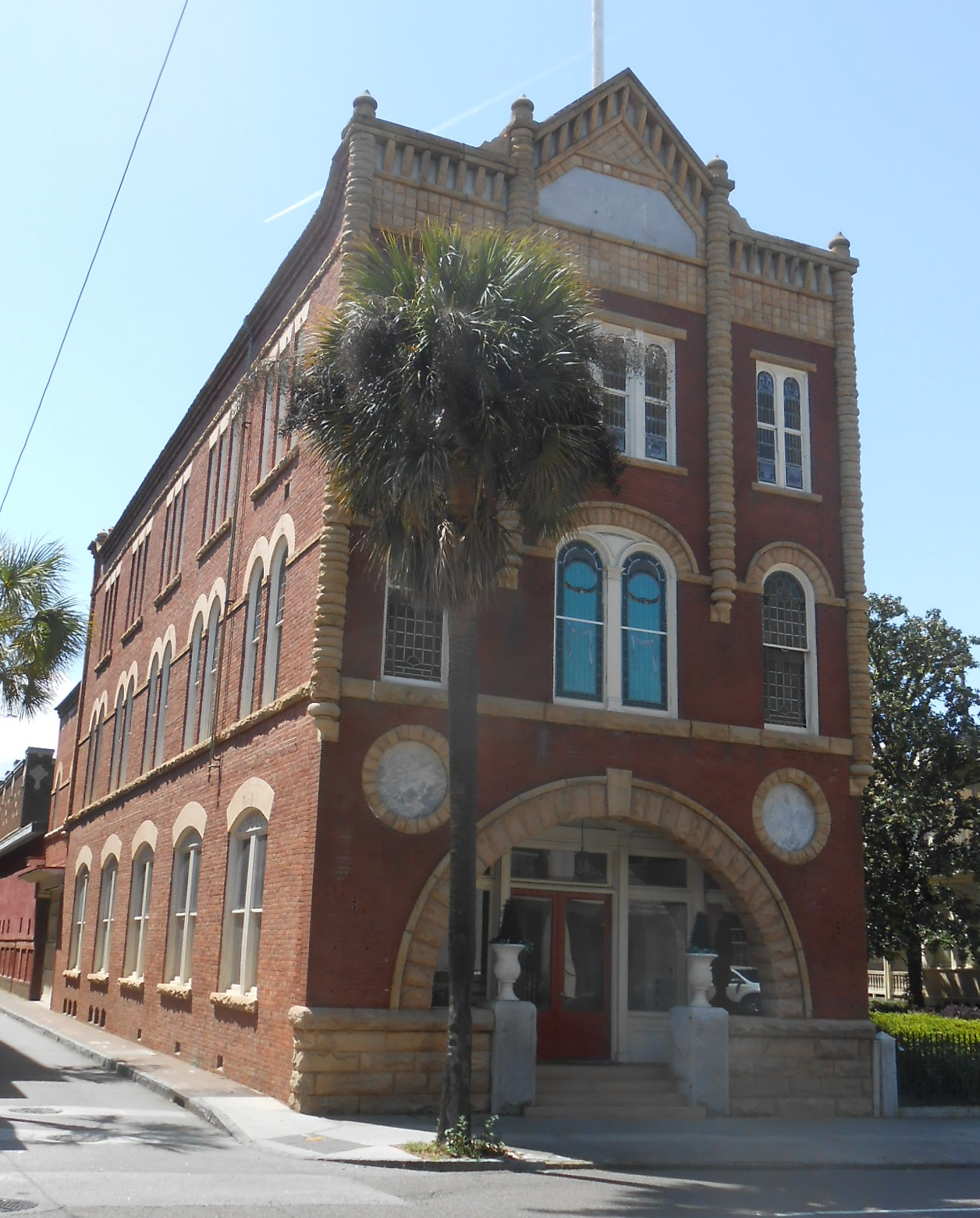
Connelly Funeral Home at 309 Meeting St.

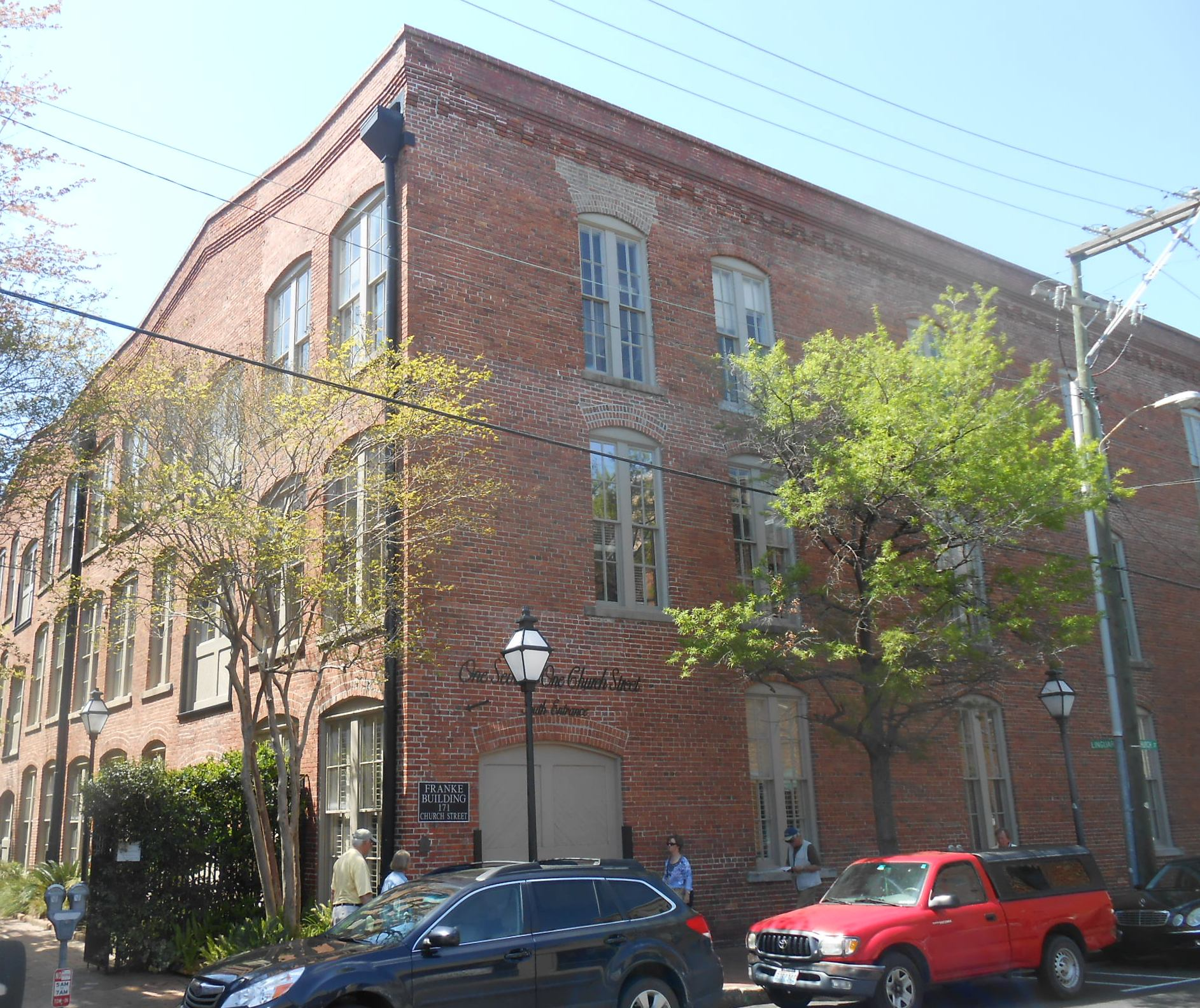
Franke Building (1908)

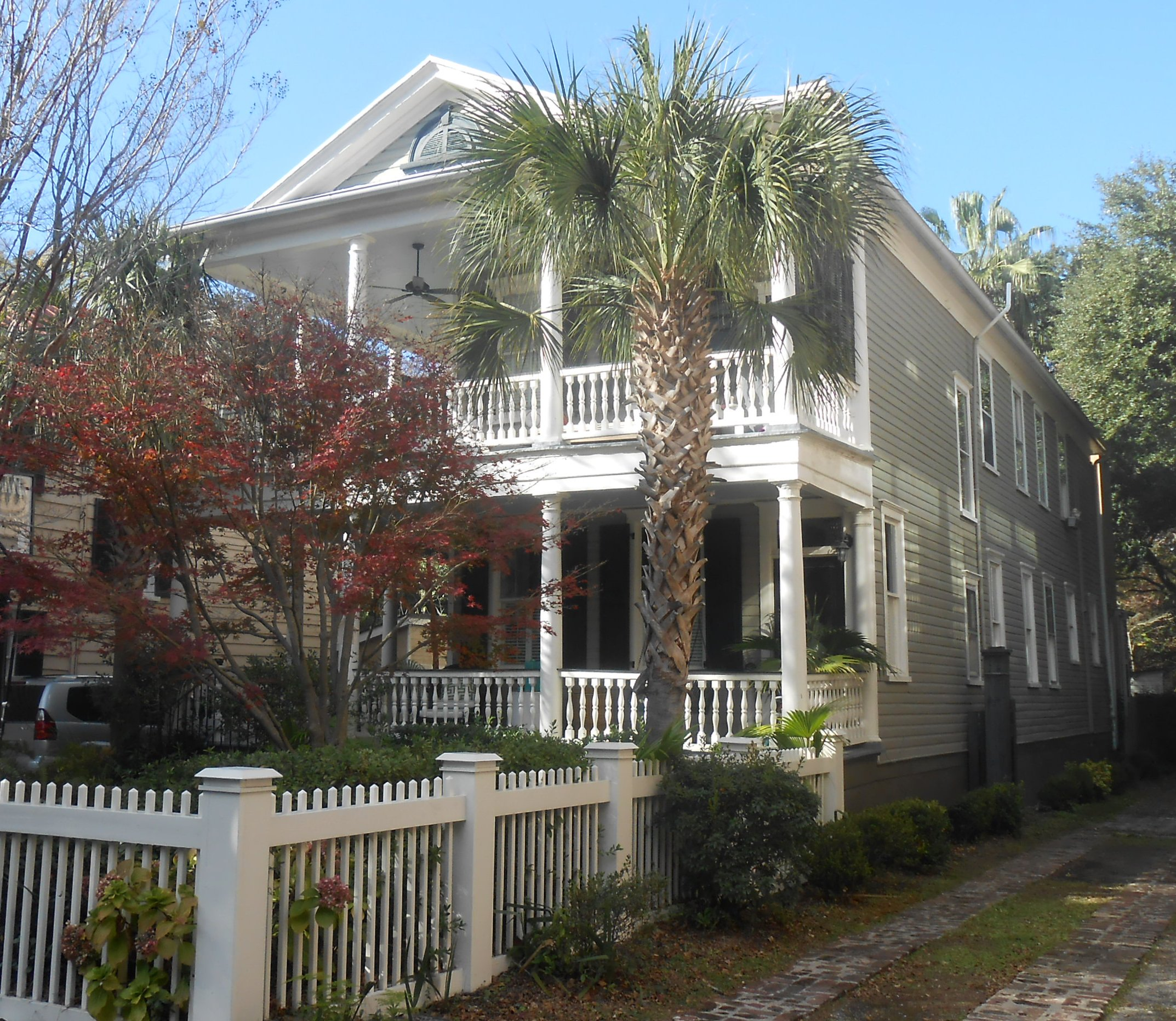
166 1/2 Wentworth St. (1909)

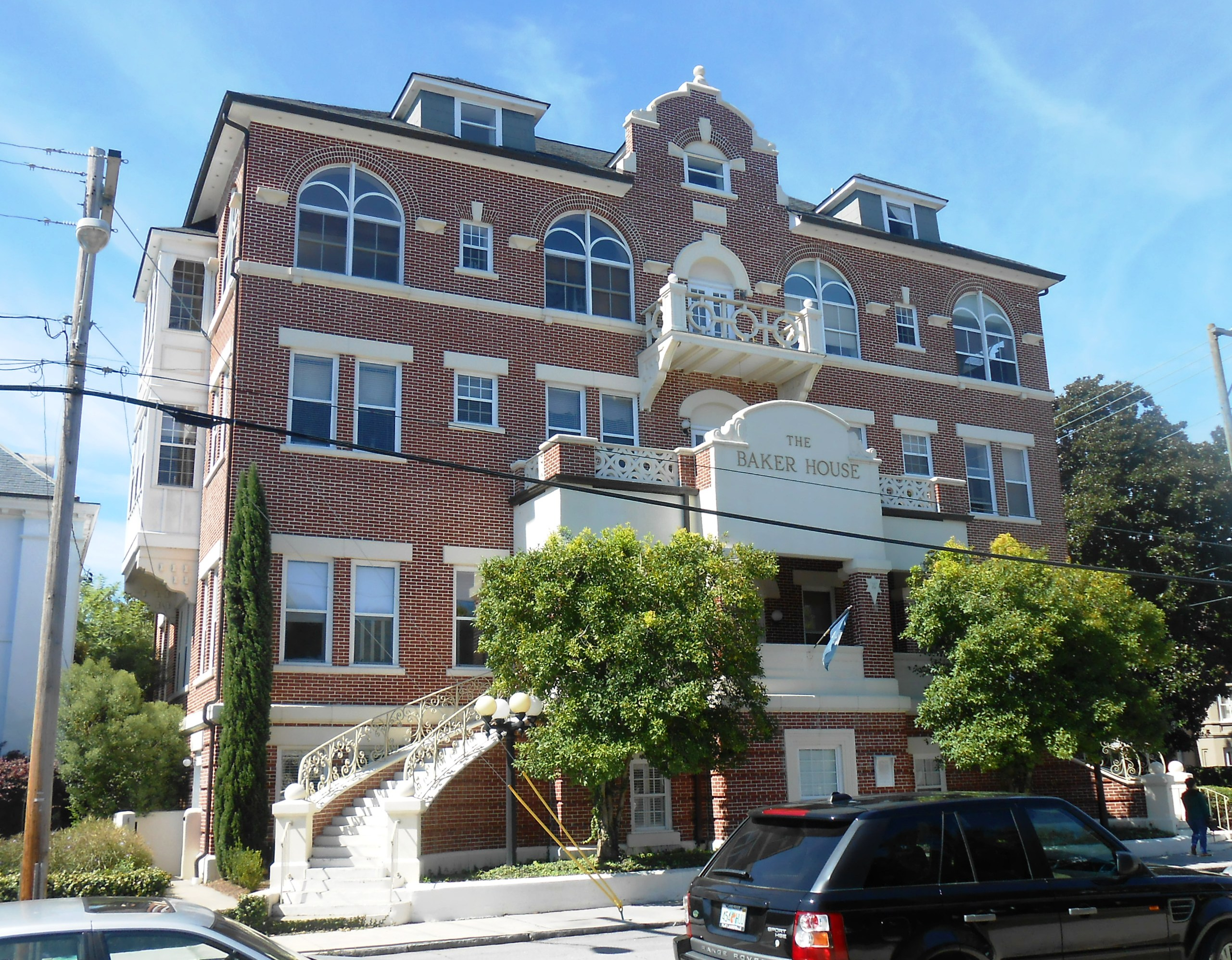
Baker Sanatorium at 55 Ashley Ave. (1912)

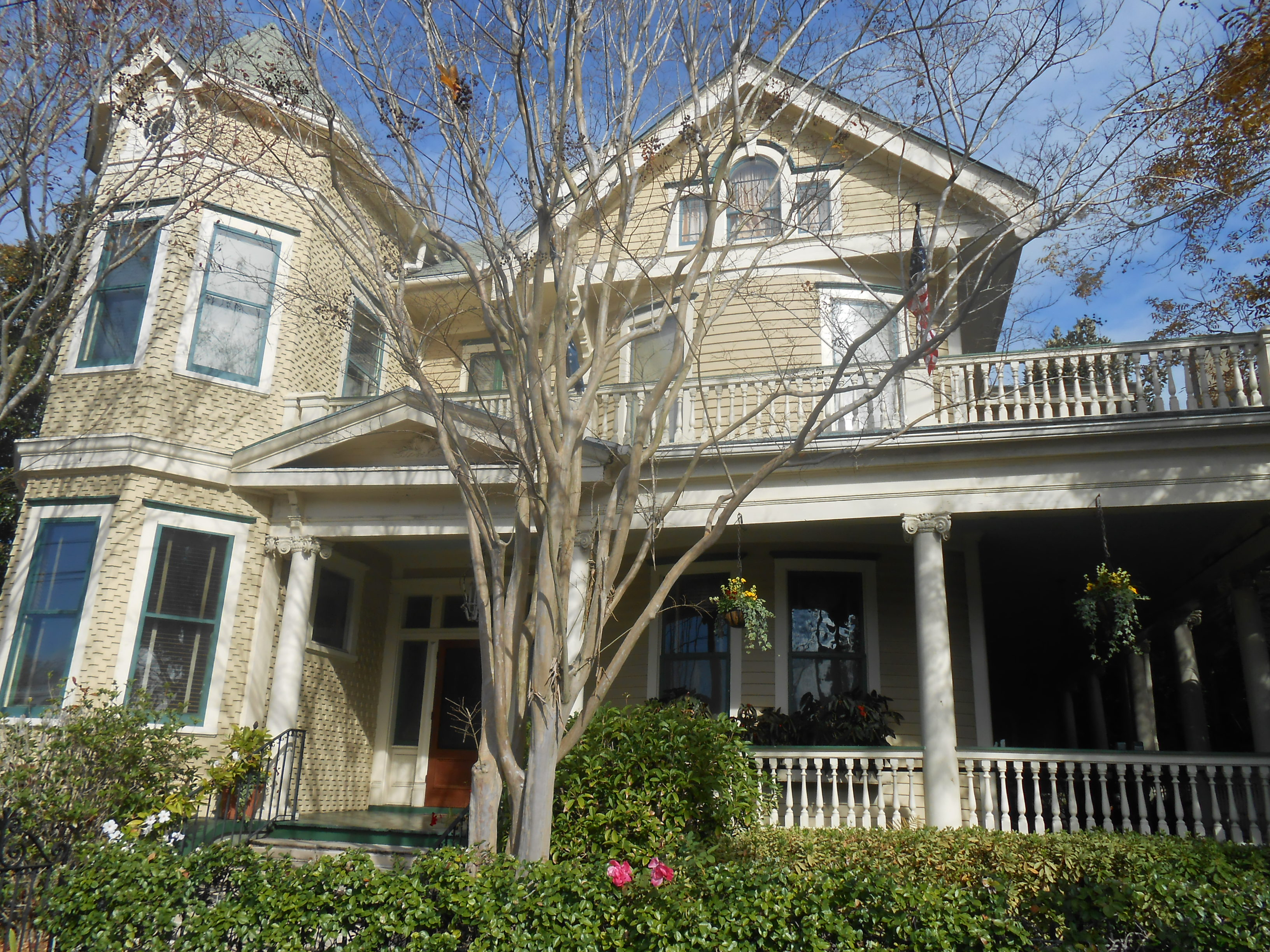
52 Rutledge Ave. (1912)

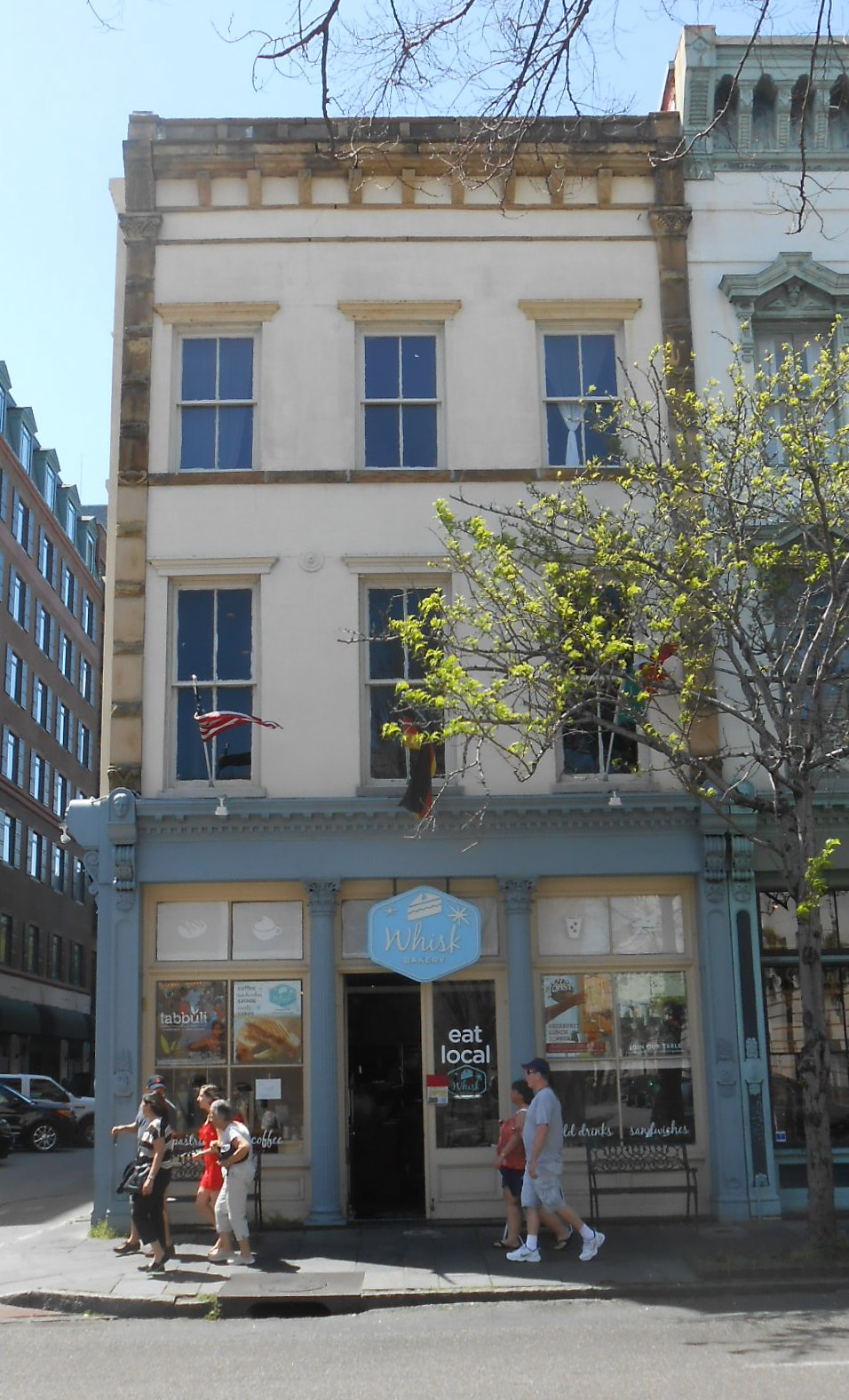
209 Meeting St. (1914)

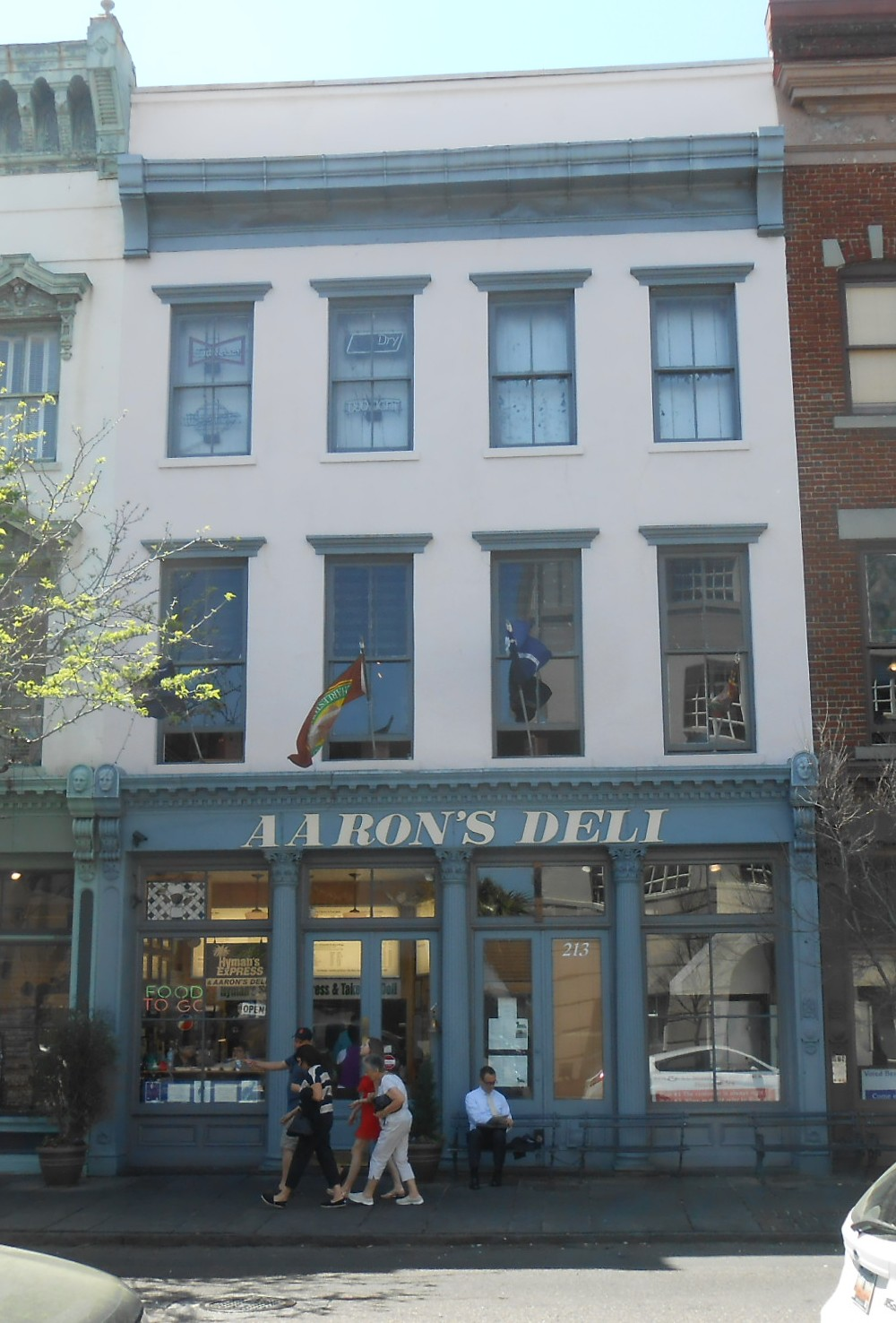
213 Meeting St. (1914)

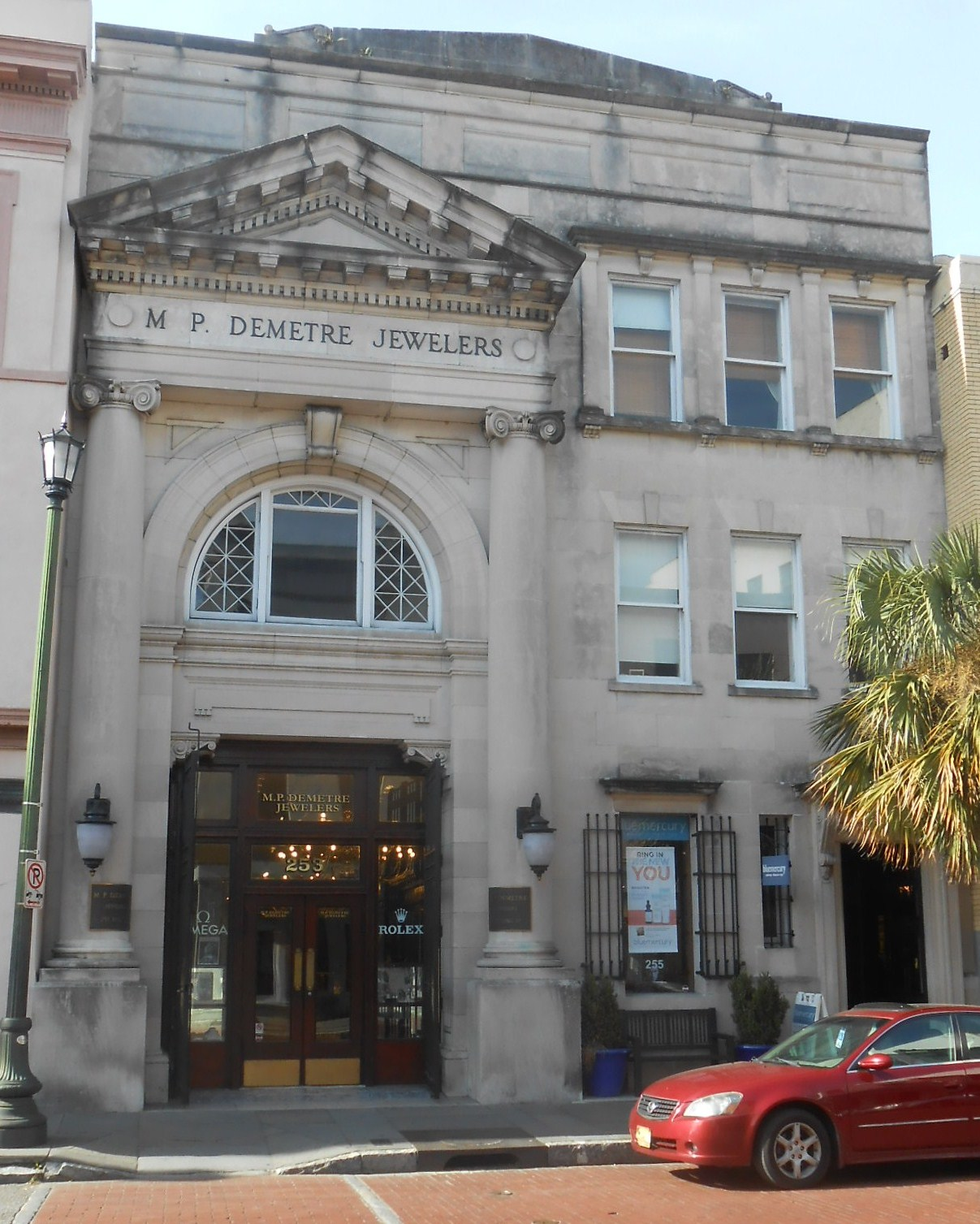
Liberty & Citizens' Bank building at 253 King St. (1914)

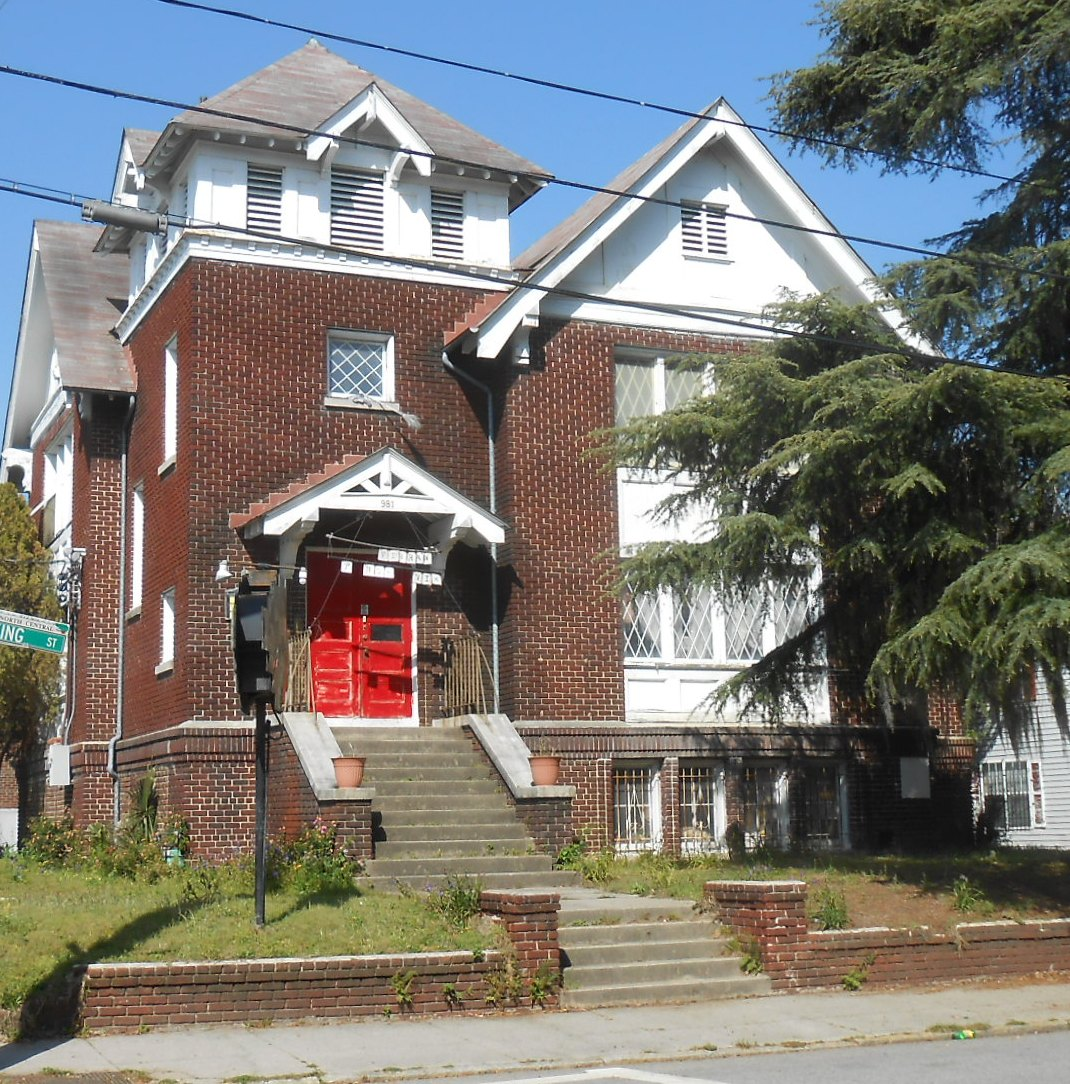
Memorial Baptist Church at 981 King St. (1915)

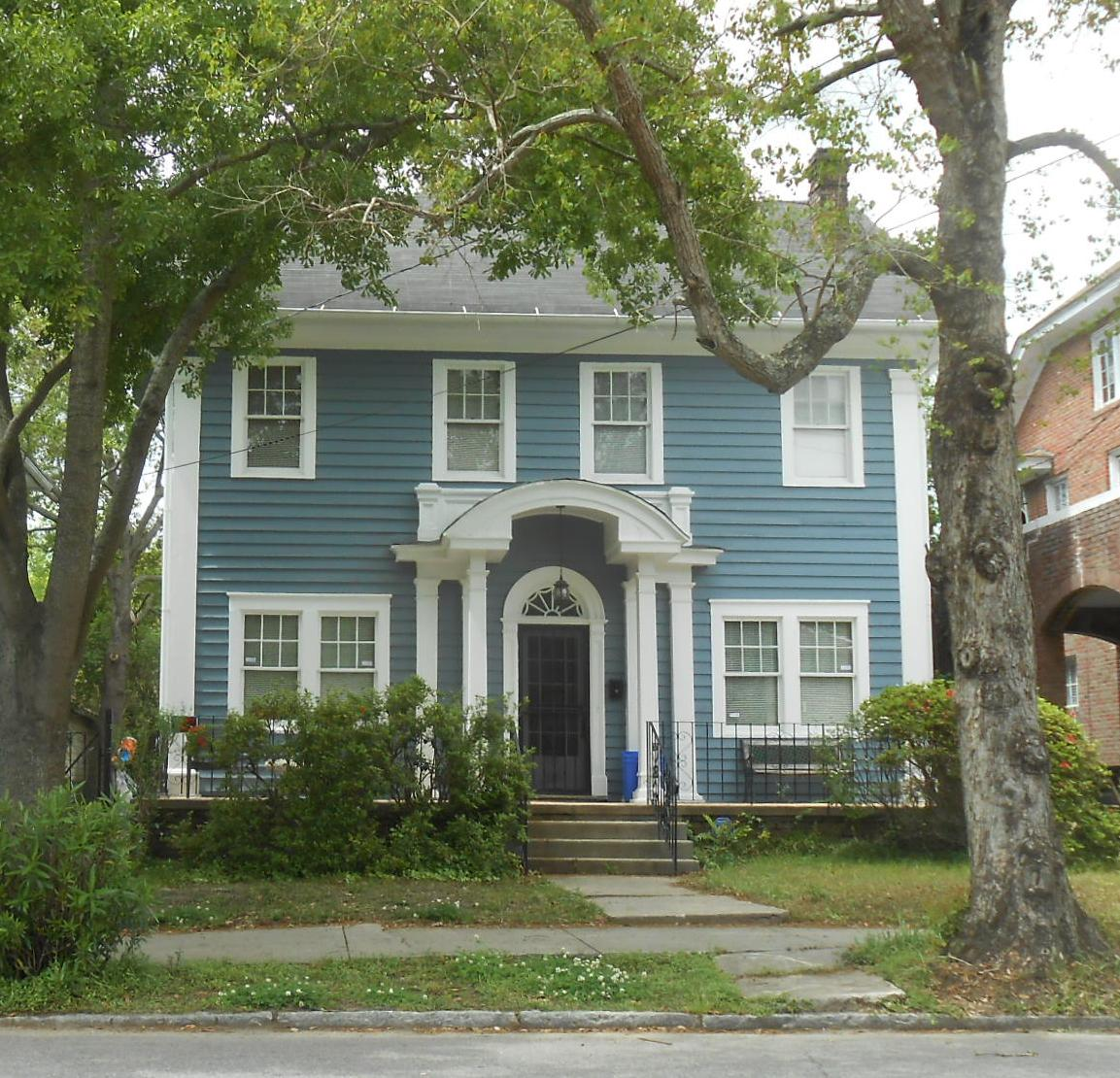
807 Rutledge Ave.

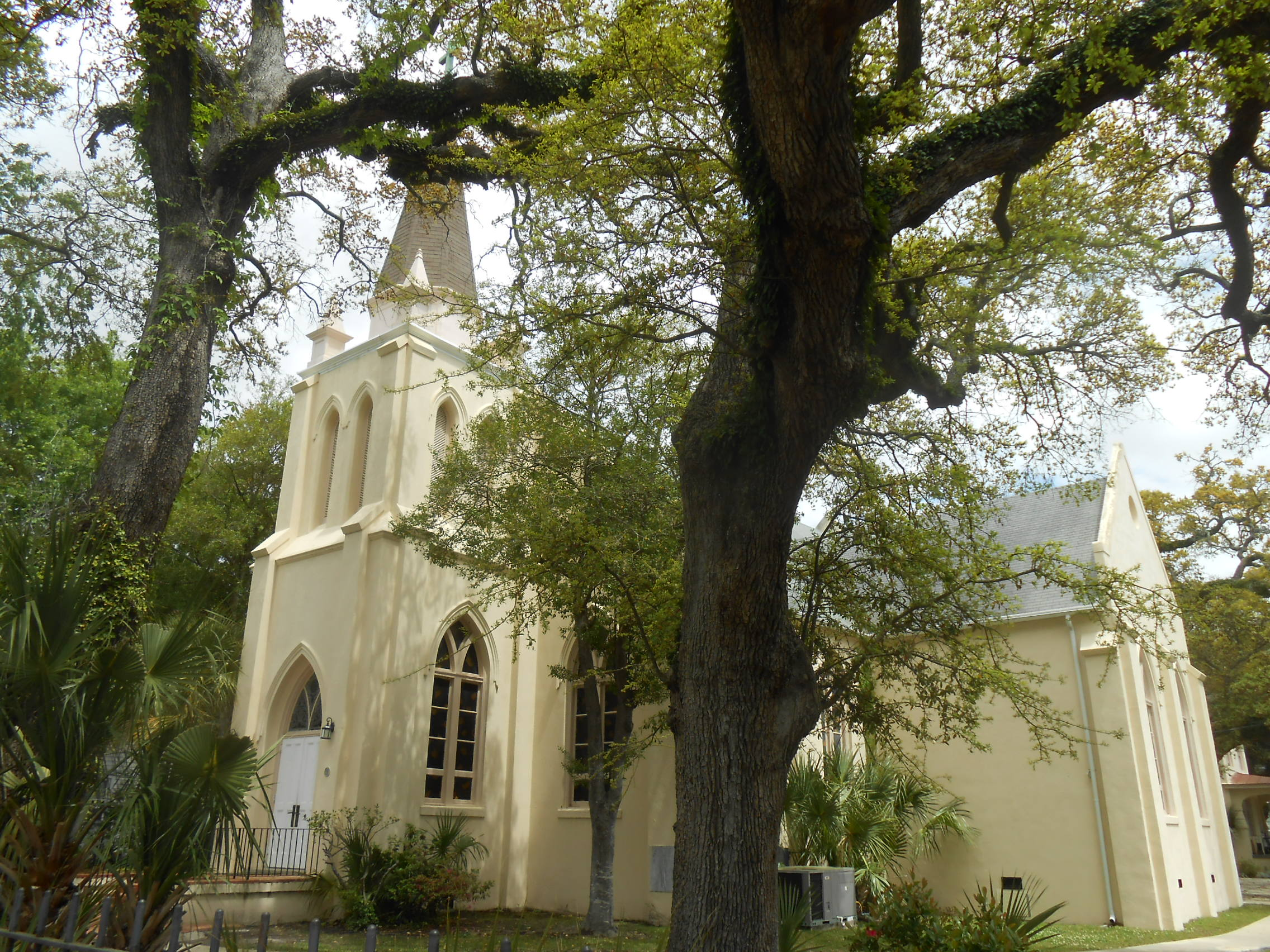
St. Peter's at 570 Rutledge Ave.

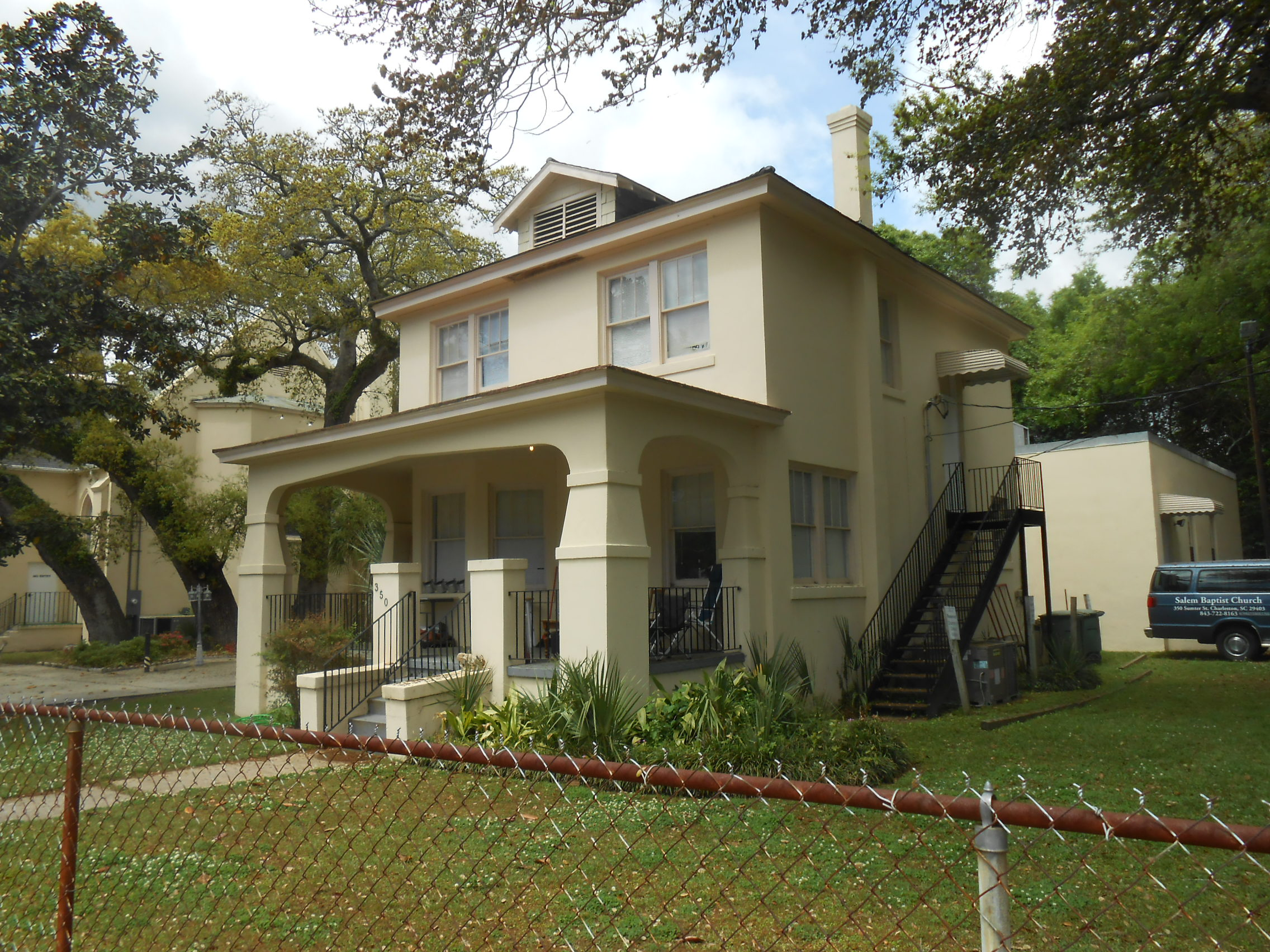
Rectory of St. Peter's at 350 Sumter St.

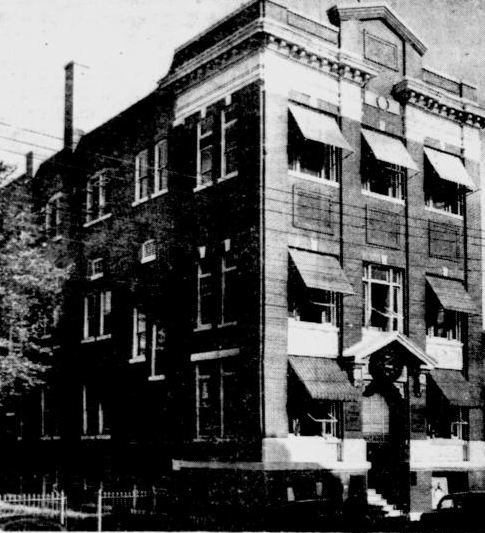
The Evening Post Building at 134 Meeting St.

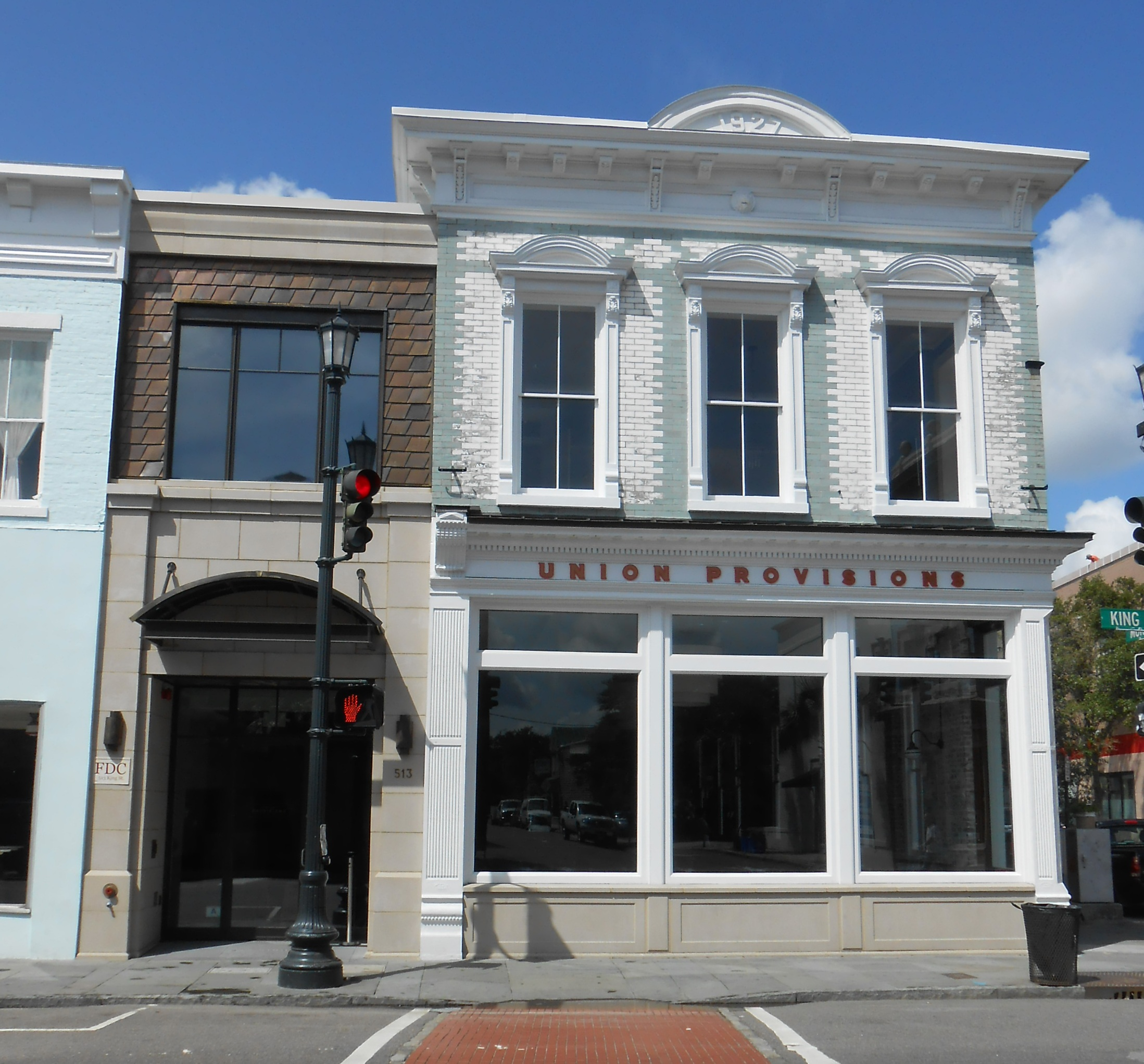
Atlantic National Bank at 515 King St. (1927)

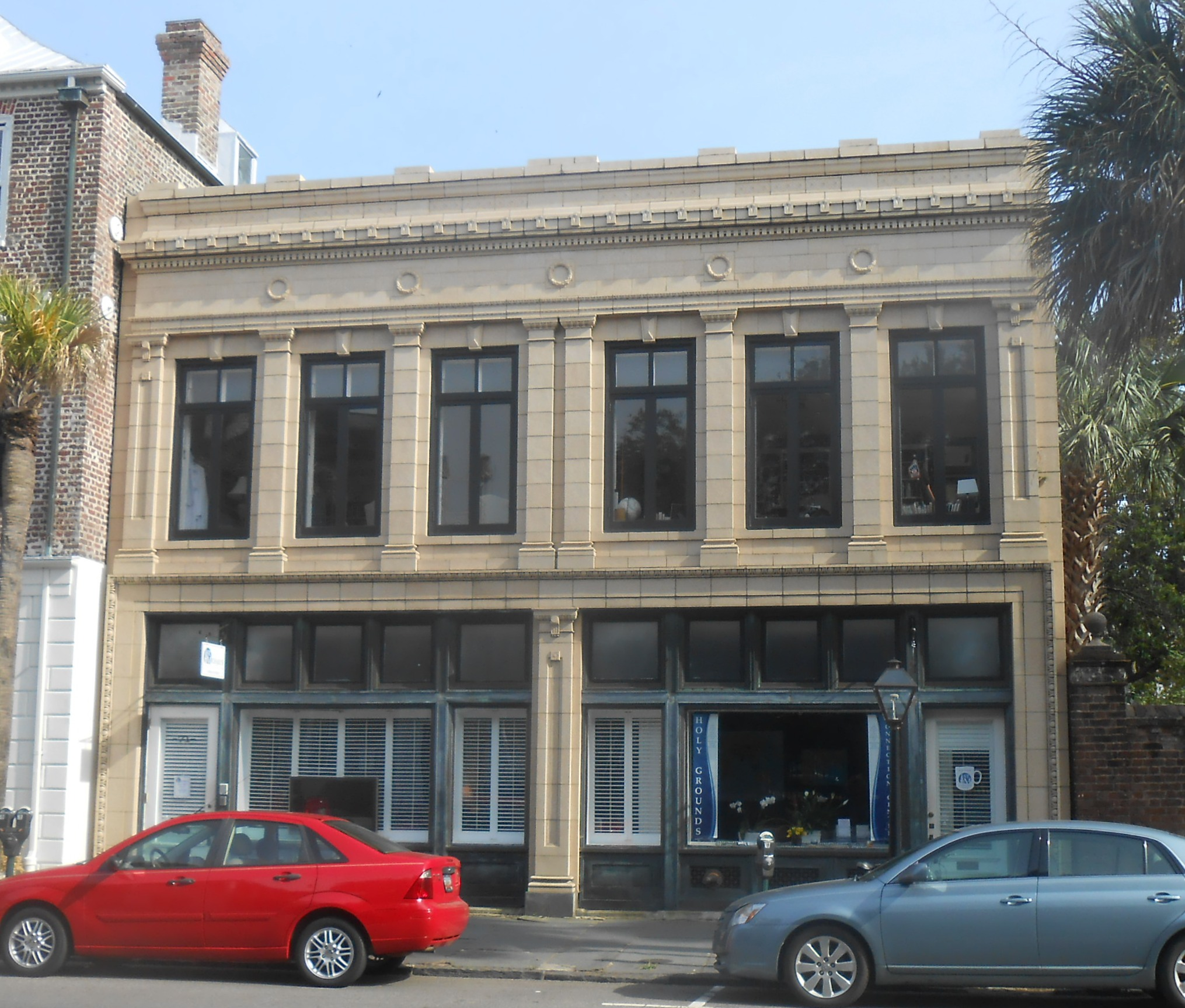
Atlantic Mortgage Co. building at 71-73 Broad St. (1929)

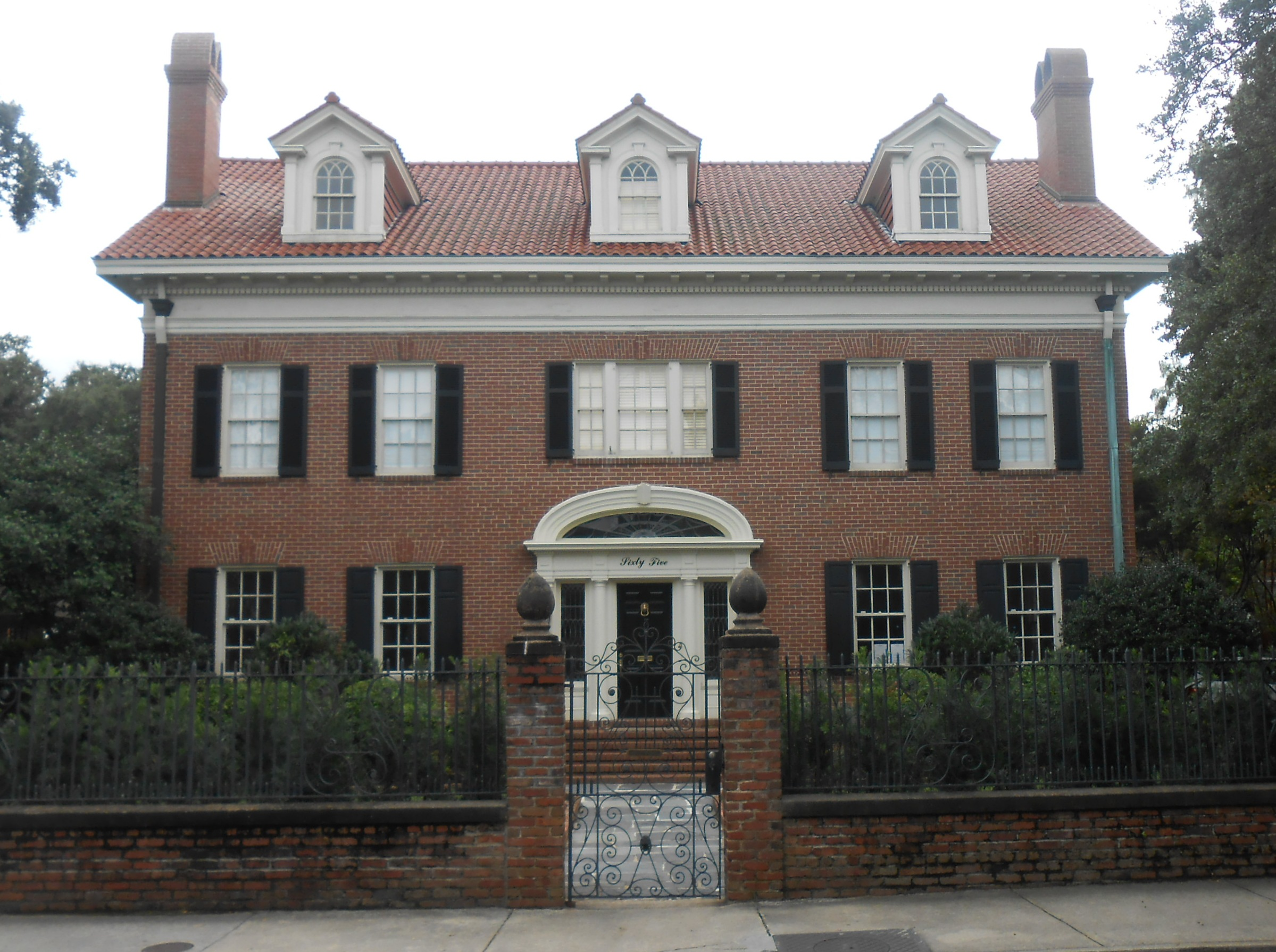
Sumter Rhames House at 65 South Battery (1931)
