= Cruttenden =

Cruttenden is a surname. Notable people with the surname include:

- Abigail Cruttenden (born 1968), English actress
- Hal Cruttenden (born 1969), English stand-up comedian, writer and actor
- Robert Cruttenden (1690–1763), English merchant, Methodist and hymn-writer
- Roger Cruttenden (born 1944), English cricketer
- Roy Cruttenden (1925–2019), British long jumper

== See also ==
- Arthur Cruttenden Mace (1874–1928), English Egyptologist
- Timothy Lawson-Cruttenden (1955–2019), British lawyer
