= Charles Nelson Crittenton =

American businessman (1833–1909)

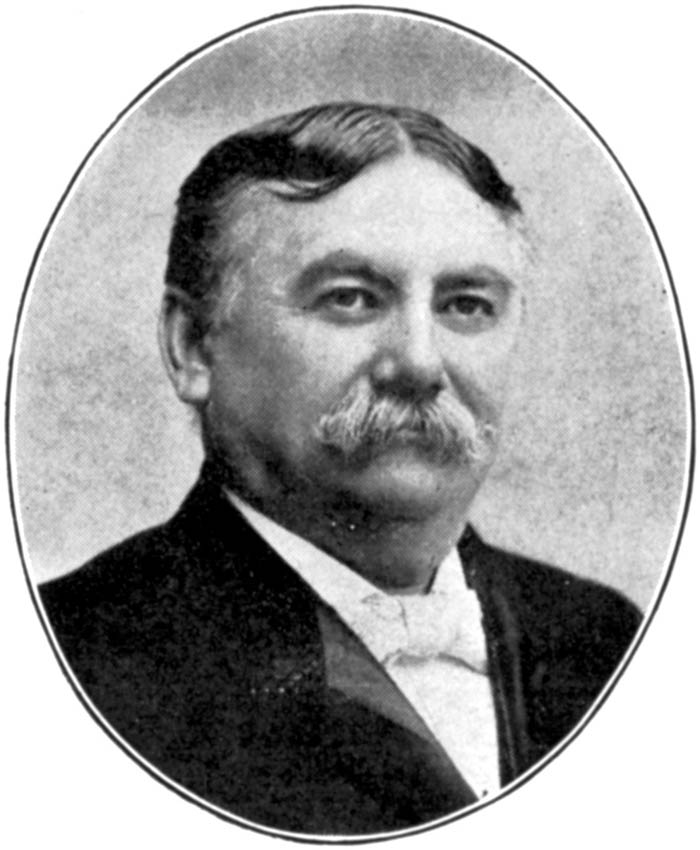
- Crittenton, c. 1908
- Born: February 20, 1833; Henderson, New York, U.S.
- Died: November 16, 1909 (aged 76); San Francisco, California, U.S.
- Resting place: New York City, New York, U.S.
- Occupations: Manufacturer; businessman; reverend
- Known for: co-founder of National Florence Crittenton Mission
- Political party: Prohibition
- Spouse: Josephine Slossin (m. 1859, died)
- Children: 3

Charles Nelson Crittenton (February 20, 1833 – November 16, 1909) was a manufacturer and distributor of drugs and patent medicines, a Protestant evangelist, and a philanthropist, best known for his founding with physician Katherine Waller Barrett of the National Florence Crittenton Mission.

== Early life ==
Charles Nelson Crittenton was born on February 20, 1833, on a farm in Henderson in Jefferson County, New York. He was the sixth of eight children to parents with English and Welsh background.

== Personal life ==
Crittenton married Josephine Slosson of New York in 1859. He had three children. In March 1882, his four-year-old daughter Florence died of scarlet fever. His wife died shortly before his daughter.

Crittenton has two houses, one at 21 Bleecker Street in New York City and another in Washington, D.C.

== Career ==
Crittenton was not satisfied with farm life, so he worked as a music teacher and clerk. He moved to New York City in 1854 and found a job with a firm in New York. Crittenton then went into the drug business, serving as a bookkeeper, cashier and salesman. He later became a partner in the company and worked as a traveling salesman. In 1861, Crittenton started his own drug business where he received orders from retail druggists and delivered back their orders. The company was incorporated in 1893. By 1893, the company was valued at US$800,000 (equivalent to $28,666,667 in 2025). The drug-manufacturing company, Charles N. Crittenton & Co. was one of the first profit-sharing concerns in the United States.

After the death of his daughter in 1882, Crittenton turned to the church and became associated with the Bleecker Street Night Mission. He traveled Europe and San Francisco in the 1890s. He used a train that he called the "Special News Extra" to tour the country with other evangelists. He spent almost three years in San Francisco teaching and preaching. During this time, Crittenton devoted his time and wealth to the establishment of the Florence Night Mission to "rescue" prostitutes. He also developed Crittenton homes for homeless and unfortunate girls and their infant children. In 1898, the National Florence Crittenton Mission received a federal charter to carry on this work. Of these mission homes more than 70 were organized in Crittenton's lifetime in all the larger cities of the United States and in Japan, China and Mexico.

He was a member of the Prohibition Party. He was the Prohibition Party's nominee for mayor of New York City, but lost.

In 1893, Crittenton met Kate Waller Barrett who would work with him closely in the years to come. For the next 16 years, Crittenton traveled across the country as an evangelist, working and living in his "Gospel Car".

== Death ==
Crittenton died of pneumonia on November 16, 1909, in San Francisco. He was interred in New York City.
