= National Florence Crittenton Mission =

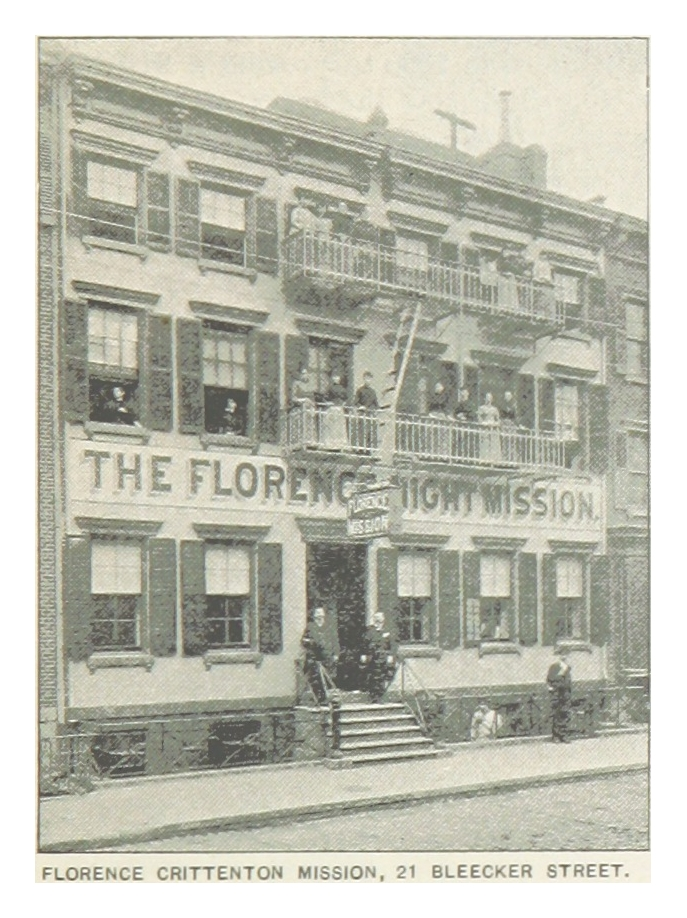
Florence Crittenton Misson, 21 Bleecker Street, 1893

The National Florence Crittenton Mission was an organization established in 1883 by Charles N. Crittenton. It attempted to reform prostitutes and unwed pregnant women through the creation of establishments where they were to live and learn skills.

== History ==
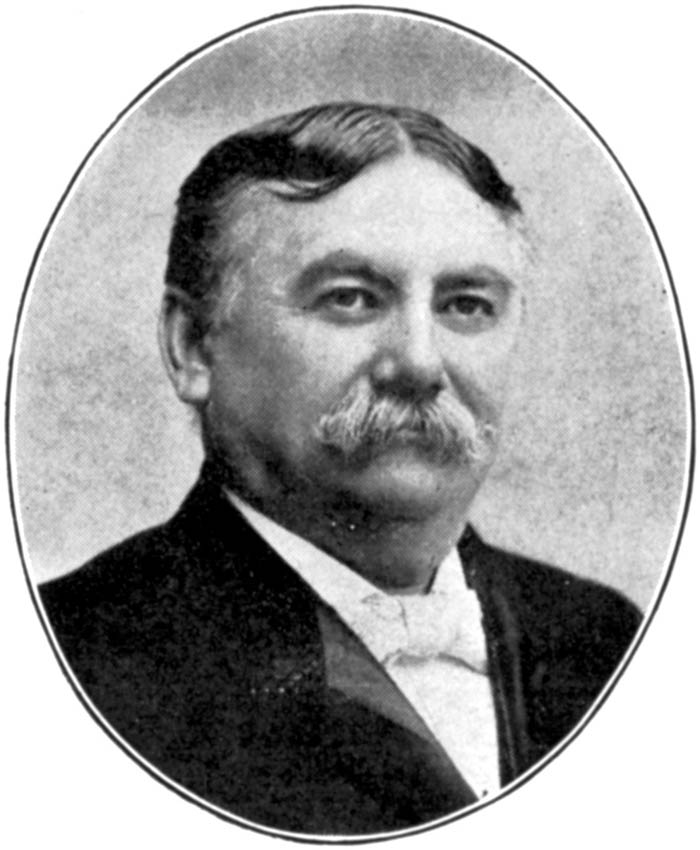
Charles Nelson Crittenton, c. 1908

The first of the organization's homes was located in New York City. Seven years later, in 1890, the second Florence Crittenton Home was opened in San Jose, California. Shortly thereafter, pioneering female physician Kate Waller Barrett joined Charles Crittenton as the driving force behind the organization and helped expand the Crittenton movement into a network of affiliated homes that at its peak included 76 homes across the U.S., in addition to homes in China, France, Japan and Mexico.

This turn of the 20th century social welfare movement helped shape the professionalization of social work, and changed social attitudes about motherhood and the role of women in society. Barrett's views on the education and training of women were considered radical at the time, but these ideas were adopted into the services provided to young women and girls at many Crittenton homes.

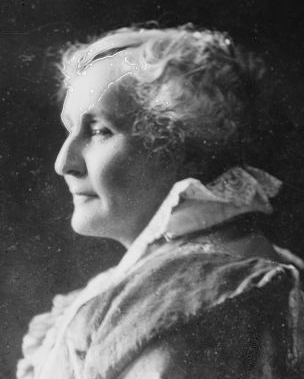
Kate Waller Barrett

A special act of Congress in 1898, signed by President McKinley, granted a national charter in perpetuity to the National Florence Crittenton Mission, and was the first U.S. national charter ever given to a charitable organization. The headquarters of the national mission was in Washington, D. C. The largest work of the mission was carried out in New York City.

In 1950, there were two organizations associated with the original mission: the National Florence Crittenton Mission and the Florence Crittenton Homes Association, which had its headquarters in Chicago, Illinois. In 1976, the Florence Crittenton Association of America merged with the Child Welfare League of America. The Florence Crittenton Mission continued to provide financial support to the Crittenton Division of the Child Welfare League.

In 2006, The National Florence Crittenton Mission adopted a new name: The National Crittenton Foundation. The organization separated from the Child Welfare League of America and returned to being a stand-alone organization affiliated with dozens of Crittenton-affiliated agences around the country. The National Crittenton Foundation's headquarters are located in Portland, Oregon.

== Past criticism ==
The National Florence Crittenton Mission's approach to adoption and to unwed pregnancy has been criticized largely due to policies used decades ago. In the past, rather than to aid pregnant women, families sent them to Crittenton homes to hide them from public view and avoid shame. Many of the women in these homes were required to give up their children for adoption. The coercive practices of these homes were detailed in The Girls Who Went Away. This mirrored a practice found in Europe generally and in Italy specifically occurring from the Middle Ages to its full flowering in the 19th century. (See Kertzer, David I. Sacrificed for Honor: Italian Infant Abandonment and the Politics of Reproductive Control. Boston: Beacon Press, 1993.)
