= Peebles (surname) =

Peebles is a surname. Notable people with the surname include:

- Aeneas Peebles (born 2001), American football player
- Alison Peebles, Scottish actress
- Andy Peebles (1948–2025), British disc jockey
- Ann Peebles, American singer
- Antony Peebles, British pianist
- Curtis Peebles, aerospace historian
- David Peebles, Scottish Renaissance composer
- Florence Peebles, American biologist
- George Peebles, Scottish footballer
- H. M. Peebles, English entomologist
- Ian Peebles, English cricketer
- James Martin Peebles, American author, organizer
- John Peebles, Canadian politician
- Mario Van Peebles, American actor, son of Melvin
- Mary Louise Peebles, American children's writer as Lynde Palmer
- Melvin Van Peebles, American actor, writer and director
- P. J. E. Peebles, Canadian-American cosmologist and Nobel Laureate
- R. Donahue Peebles, African-American hotel developer
- Richard Peebles, Scottish singer known as Rikki
- Robert Hibbs Peebles, American botanist
- Sarah Peebles, American composer

== Fictional characters ==
- Melvin Peebles, character on The Magilla Gorilla Show
