= Florence Peebles =

American biologist

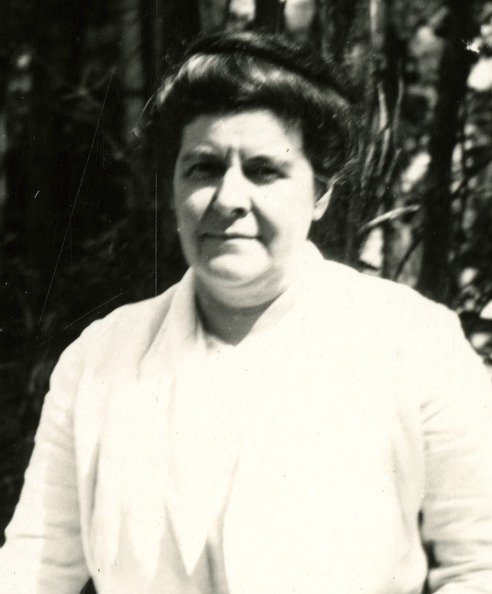
- Peebles in 1921
- Born: June 3, 1874; Pewee Valley, KY
- Died: December 1, 1956 (aged 82)
- Education: Bryn Mawr College
- Scientific career
- Fields: Embryology / Medicine

Florence Peebles (June 3, 1874 – December 1, 1956) was an American embryologist known for her research in animal regeneration and tissue formation.

Born in Pewee Valley, Kentucky, to parents Elizabeth Southgate (née Cummins) and Thomas Chalmers Peebles, she was educated in Baltimore, attending the Girls' Latin School and earning a B.A. from the Woman's College of Baltimore (later Goucher College) in 1895. She then attended Bryn Mawr College in Pennsylvania, earning a PhD in 1900. She taught biology for thirty-three years, including at Bryn Mawr College, Goucher College, Tulane University, and California Christian College (now Chapman University)

She established the bacteriology department at Chapman University, and founded the biology laboratory at Lewis & Clark College.

Between 1895 and 1924, she performed much of her research at the Marine Biological Laboratory at Woods Hole, Massachusetts.

She was a fellow of the American Association for the Advancement of Science and the American Geographical Society, and a member of the American Society of Naturalists, American Society of Zoologists, and the Women's Rest Tour Association. She was awarded an honorary LL.D. by Goucher College in 1954.
