= Crittenton Women's Union =

American non-profit organization

Crittenton Women’s Union
- Founded: July 2006 as a result of the merger of Crittenton Inc. and The Women's Educational and Industrial Union
- Type: Non-profit; NGO; Advocacy Group
- Location: Administrative Offices in downtown Boston; Six program sites in Greater Boston
- Services: Helping low-income women achieve economic self-sufficiency
- Fields: Direct services, Research, Advocacy
- Employees: 120
- Website: liveworkthrive.org Blog: voicesprojectblog.org

Crittenton Women's Union (CWU) is a Boston, Massachusetts–based non-profit organization whose mission is to help low-income women and their families reach economic self-sufficiency.

== Overview ==
Crittenton Women's Union provides direct services to low-income and at-risk women and their families in the Greater Boston area. In addition, it conducts research and practices public advocacy to identify barriers to economic self-sufficiency and to lobby for legislative and policy changes to remove them. On May 6, 2016, Economic Independence Day, Crittenton Women's Union declared its future as Economic Mobility Pathways (EMPath).

=== Direct services ===
CWU serves approximately 1,400 people a year, providing emergency and transitional housing, workforce development and education programs, and family support services. Crittenton Women's Union has the capacity to house 135 families in multiple locations, and is one of the largest provider of shelter for homeless mothers and children in Massachusetts.

=== Research ===
Crittenton Women's Union conducts research into the economic, political, and social barriers disadvantaged women face in their efforts to gain economic security. CWU's most recent research publications include:

- The Massachusetts Economic Independence Index 2010: The Massachusetts Economic Independence Index 2010 reports how much annual income a family needs to meet its basic living costs in Massachusetts.
- Hot Jobs 2010: This survey lists careers that require two years or less of post-secondary education or training, meet the Massachusetts Economic Independence Index income level for a single-parent family with two children, and currently have job openings available within the state.
- Beyond Financial Aid: This booklet provides a guide to public supports available to low-income adults attempting to pay for school while supporting themselves and their families.
- For-Profit Colleges and the CWU Client Experience: This document is a policy brief published in October 2010 that reports on CWU clients who had attended for-profit colleges and sought help through CWU's Student Debt Assistance Program during a 10-month period. . It also lists reform recommendations.
- The Cliff Effect Experience: Voices of Women on the Path to Economic Independence: This report details the hardships that low-wage families must face in the Greater Boston area when slight gains in income lead to dramatic cuts in public supports, a consequence known as the “cliff effect. It includes some commentary from low-income mothers.
- Fits & Starts: The Difficult Path for Working Single Parents: This policy brief, published in partnership with The Center for Social Policy at UMass Boston, highlights the difficult choices low-wage workers must make between moving up the wage ladder and losing critical public supports before they are economically stable. It also details opportunities for state programs to adjust eligibility criteria and for service providers to offer guidance to its clients in these situations.

=== Advocacy ===
Based on its research and direct service experience, CWU advocates for legislation and policy changes that remove the obstacles that prevent low-income women from gaining economic self-sufficiency. Crittenton Women's Union works with local and national partners to raise awareness and support for these issues.

== History of Crittenton Women's Union ==
In July 2006, Crittenton, Inc. and the Women's Educational and Industrial Union merged to become Crittenton Women's Union (CWU). CWU combined the work of both organizations to better meet the needs of low-income women and their families. Each legacy organization represented more than 150 years of direct service to women.

=== Economic Mobility Pathways, EMPath ===
In 2016 the Crittenton Women's Union became Economic Mobility Pathways, EMPath.

=== Crittenton, Inc. ===
Crittenton, Inc. was established in Boston, MA in 1836, to provide temporary homes, employment assistance, and guidance for young women who came to Boston from farms and foreign countries. Until its merger with the Women's Educational and Industrial Union in 2006, Crittenton, Inc. offered programs in housing, education and child-care, health, nutrition, parenting, and family life skills.

=== Women's Educational and Industrial Union ===
The Women's Educational and Industrial Union (WEIU) was founded for the advancement of women in 1877 in Boston, Massachusetts by Harriet Clisby, one of America's first women physicians. In the 20th century, it created many programs that were geared toward the advancement of women in the workplace, and especially focused on low-income mothers and their families. In 2001, the WEIU launched the Woman to Woman Program, offering career development and mentoring to low-income mothers. Now offered by CWU, this program continues to serve low-income women today.

== See also ==
- Crittenton, Inc.
- Women's Educational and Industrial Union
