= Crittenton, Inc. =

Defunct American non-profit organization

Crittenton, Inc. was a Boston, Massachusetts–based non-profit organization whose mission was to help young people develop the essential tools that they need to maintain stable housing, find and retain employment, and support the healthy growth of their families.

== Overview ==
Crittenton, Inc. was the product of a merger between two pioneering women’s rights societies of the late 19th century; the Boston Female Moral Reform Society and the Florence Crittenton Home. Both organizations had similar goals in assisting poor and unwed mothers and ultimately worked together to help these women achieve economic independence.

=== New England Moral Reform Society ===
Originally the Boston Female Moral Reform Society, this organization was established in 1824, when a group of women came together to provide shelter and moral guidance to troubled young girls. Since the organization had no building, the Society’s members brought the unwed young mothers into their own homes. Their peers were shocked, and some ministers denounced them for being “unwomanly” and for daring to face the unpleasant realities of life.

For the next 45 years, the Society grew as it concentrated its efforts on rescuing young women from the streets and continuing its crusade against liquor and prostitution. In 1869, the organization changed its name to the New England Moral Reform Society and established a maternity home and hospital in Boston’s Jamaica Plain neighborhood. That same year, Dr. Caroline Hastings, a physician and vocal proponent of women's equality, successfully redirected the Society's energy to establish the Talitha Cumi Home, a maternity home for unwed mothers. The home was renamed The Hastings House in honor of Dr. Hastings' service. As the New England Moral Reform Society continued its efforts, a similar organization, the Florence Crittenton Home, was emerging in Boston in the 1890s.

=== Florence Crittenton Home ===
Charles Crittenton, a wealthy pharmaceutical wholesaler, founded the Florence Crittenton Homes that provided shelter and moral guidance to poor and unwed mothers. He established a mission for young girls, and by the mid-1890s, his vision of a network of more than 50 Florence Crittenton Homes throughout the country became a reality.

Boston’s Florence Crittenton Home shared many of the same goals as the New England Moral Reform Society. It targeted prostitution and joined forces with the Boston police to help close down the city’s “disorderly houses.” In 1896, Boston Florence Crittenton Home was established at 37 Green Street as a mission for unwed mothers. A network of Boston-area shelters soon followed, in Roxbury, Boston, Watertown, Massachusetts, Downtown Boston, and eventually, at its present site in Brighton, Massachusetts. In 1908, the organization was renamed the Florence Crittenton League of Compassion Inc.

In 1924, the Crittenton league secured six acres of land at 10 Perthshire Road in Oak Square, Brighton, Massachusetts, once the old Peter Faneuil estate and later, the Adams estate. Harold Field Kellogg, a leading architect of the time, designed the Crittenton Home and Hospital.

== Pursuing similar goals ==
For the next 56 years, Hastings House and the Florence Crittenton League of Compassion Inc. operated on parallel missions. The two organizations provided housing as well as maternal and infant care and offered job training and educational programs that could help unwed mothers become self-sufficient.

In the 1930s, the Florence Crittenton League of Compassion Inc. established a unit for treating venereal diseases and both organizations coped with the increasing demands spurred by the Great Depression. It was also in the late 1930s that the Talitha Cumi Home began reaching out to young fathers with a unique program designed to encourage strong family bonds.

=== 1961 merger ===
In 1961, the two organizations merged to become the Crittenton Hastings House of the Florence Crittenton League of Compassion, Inc., better known as Crittenton Hastings House or Crittenton, Inc.

In 1962, the first alternative high school in Boston Public Schools was established at Crittenton, Inc. so that young pregnant women could complete their high school educations.

In 1973, it opened the first fully licensed freestanding abortion clinic in Massachusetts, following the passage of the landmark Supreme Court case Roe v. Wade. The clinic was opened amid considerable controversy, resulting in the disbandment of many of its groups of volunteers and the loss of United Way funding. The 1980s and 1990s saw another shift in Crittenton’s emphasis. It demanded a strong education foundation as a prerequisite for economic independence and success, and began to aid young at-risk families to attain and sustain self-sufficiency.

=== 2006 merger ===
In 2006, Crittenton, Inc. and The Women's Educational and Industrial Union merged to form what is known today as Crittenton Women's Union.

== See also ==
- Crittenton Women's Union
- Women's Educational and Industrial Union
