= Caroline Dexter =

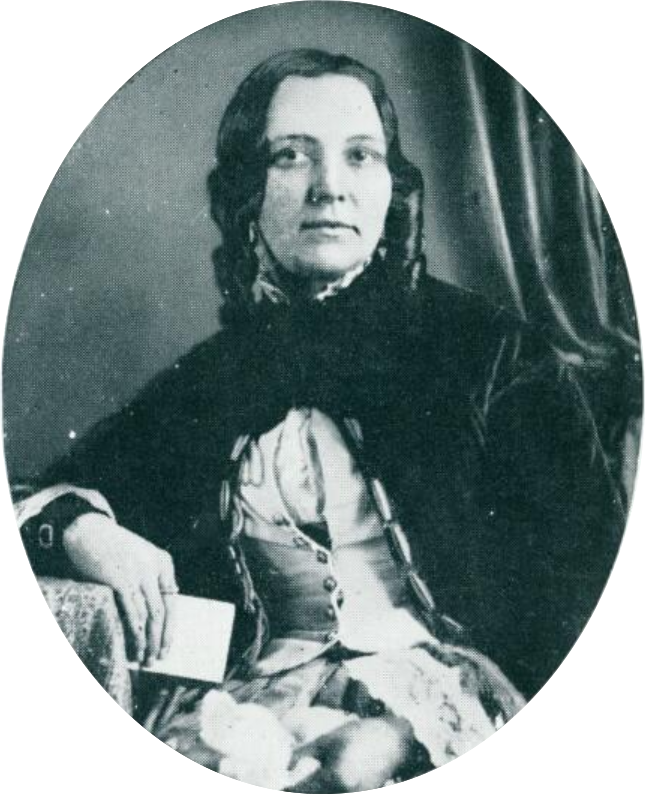
- Born: Caroline Harper; 6 January 1819; Nottingham, England
- Died: 19 August 1884 (aged 65); North Brighton, Victoria, Australia
- Other name: Caroline Lynch
- Occupations: Writer; feminist; dress reformer
- Spouses: William Dexter (m. 1843, separated); William Lynch (m. 1861)

Caroline Dexter (née Harper; 6 January 1819 – 19 August 1884), later known as Caroline Lynch, was an English-Australian dress reformer, writer, and feminist.

== Early life ==
Dexter was born Caroline Harper in Nottingham, England on 6 January 1819, in. Her parents were Mary Harper née Simson, and Richard Harper, a watch maker and jeweller. She was educated privately in England and Paris, where she became good friends with novelist George Sand. In 1843, in Nottingham, she married the painter, William Dexter, who later migrated to Sydney, Australia aboard the Bank of England in 1852. Dexter followed in 1855 aboard the Marie Gabrielle.

== Career ==
In Sydney, Dexter and William opened and ran a Gallery of Arts and School of Design, where Dexter was a teacher. However, this soon failed as a venture. They subsequently moved to Gippsland in 1856. While in Gippsland she wrote Ladies Almanack: The Southern Cross or Australian Album and New Years Gift. When it was published in 1858 it was the first ladies' almanack published in the colonies. Soon after the book was complete Dexter separated from William, who moved back to Sydney, while she moved to Melbourne.

After lecturing about the bloomers in London and beyond, Dexter continued to pursue her interest in dress reform in Australia. Her continued support for dress reform caused controversy in the Sydney Morning Herald. Nonetheless, she ran an Institute of Hygiene and promoted divided skirts for women and the abolition of corsets in Melbourne.

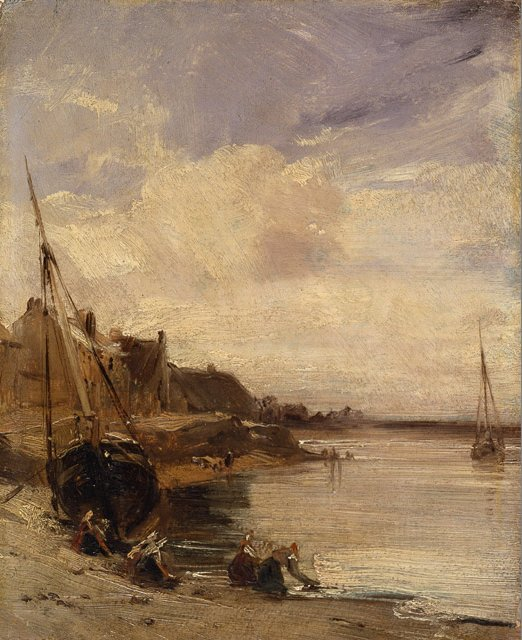
'Low Tide at Boulogne', by Richard Parkes Bonington, was part of Dexter and Lynch's art collection.

Dexter met Harriet Clisby through their shared interests in social reform and feminism. Together in 1861 they produced the first all-women publication called the Interpreter which released two issues.

In 1861, Dexter married solicitor William Lynch, who became the mayor of Brighton. Together they held a salon at their Brighton residence, and acquired an important collection of Australian art. Lynch stated "It was my wife's mind that attracted me, and from her I learned all that I know of art".

Dexter and Lynch acquired a large collection of Art which included Richard Parkes Bonington's Low Tide at Boulogne, which was later acquired by the National Gallery of Victoria (NGV). However, this artwork was stolen from gallery in 1999. The NGV discovered it was missing five years later during an audit, listed it on the lost art register, and reported it to police. However, it was later reported that they did not inform the State Government until 2011 which sparked controversy.

== Death ==
Dexter died on 19 August 1884, in North Brighton at her residence 'Bombala', aged 65.

== Legacy ==
- Dexter Street in the Canberra suburb Cook is named in her honour.
- A book about William and Caroline, Folie A Deux: William and Caroline Dexter in Colonial Australia, was written by Patrick Morgan in 1999.
