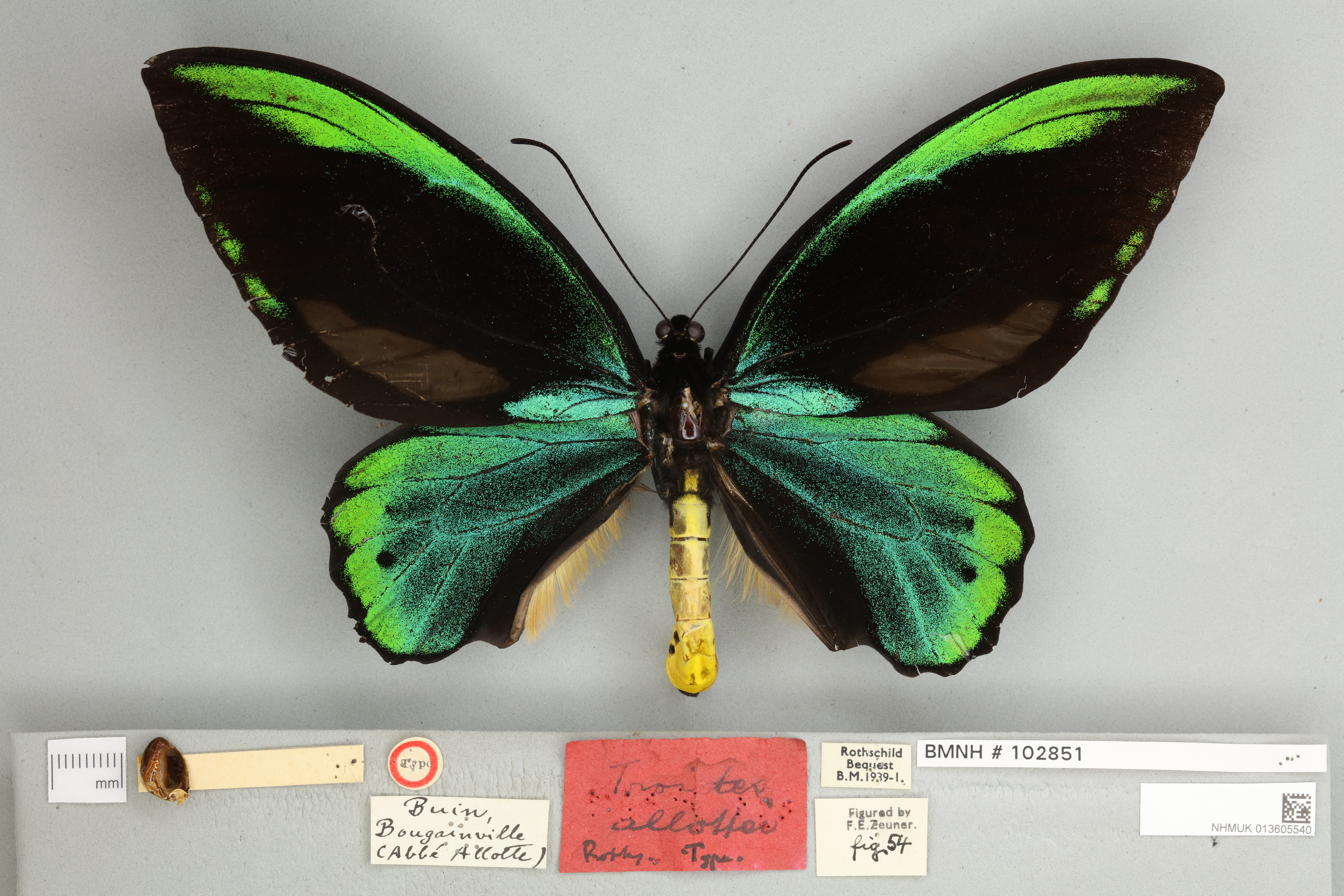
- Holotype male
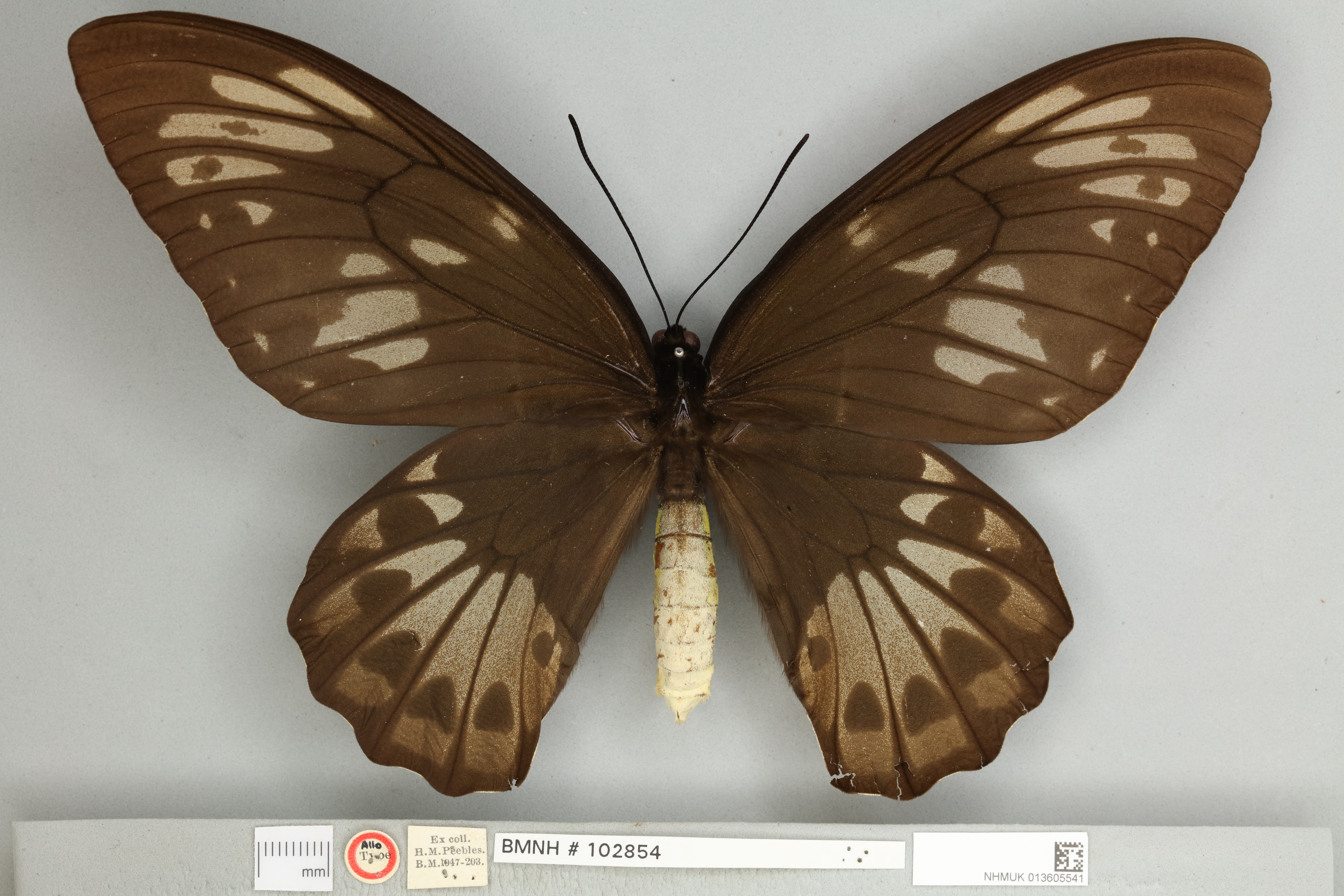
- Neallotype female

Scientific classification
- Domain: Eukaryota
- Kingdom: Animalia
- Phylum: Arthropoda
- Class: Insecta
- Order: Lepidoptera
- Family: Papilionidae
- Tribe: Troidini
- Genus: Ornithoptera
- Species: O. victoriae × O. priamus urvillianus

Synonyms
- Ornithoptera allotei

= Ornithoptera allotei =

Species of butterfly

Ornithoptera allotei is the name given to a birdwing butterfly that is a natural hybrid between Ornithoptera victoriae and Ornithoptera priamus urvillianus. Despite the fact that hybrids do not warrant a binomial name, the name Ornithoptera allotei persists from the original description of the butterfly as a species.

The hybrid is known from Bougainville Island and Malaita Island, where the ranges of both parent species overlap.

This butterfly is, because of its rarity, one of the most valuable in the world, with male specimens typically selling for more than £4,000 (US$7,000). It is said to be an ideal candidate for commercial exploitation because its parents are not rare on Bougainville Island, and they may be easily induced to mate with one another.

== History ==
Ornithoptera allotei was described by Walter Rothschild in 1914 as a species, despite the assertion by its discoverer, Abbé Allotte, a priest at the Buin Mission, Bougainville Island, that it was a natural hybrid.

It was originally placed in the genus Troides. The female was described by H. M. Peebles and W. Schmassmann in 1917.

Schmid (1970), McAlpine (1970) and Haugum & Low (1978) all held the hybrid theory but the final proof of O. allotei being a natural hybrid was made by Ramón Straatman (Jan Haugum in Papilio International (1990)).

== See also ==
- Ornithoptera akakeae
- Troides mixtum
