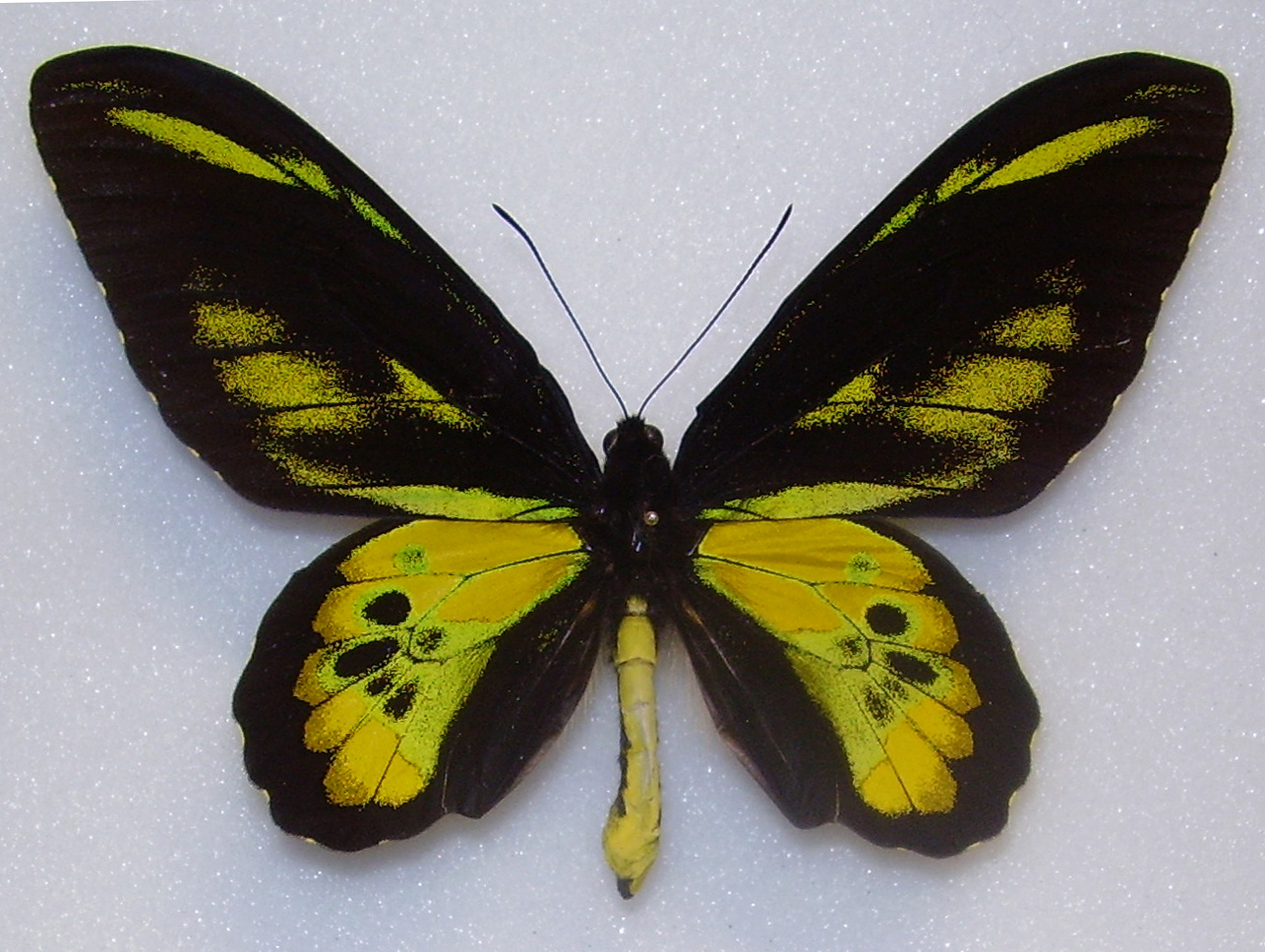
- Ornithoptera rothschildi male, upperside

Conservation status
- Near Threatened (IUCN 3.1)
- CITES Appendix II

Scientific classification
- Kingdom: Animalia
- Phylum: Arthropoda
- Class: Insecta
- Order: Lepidoptera
- Family: Papilionidae
- Genus: Ornithoptera
- Species: O. rothschildi

Binomial name
- Ornithoptera rothschildi Kenrick, 1911

= Rothschild's birdwing =

Species of birdwing butterfly

Rothschild's birdwing (Ornithoptera rothschildi) is a large birdwing butterfly, endemic to the Arfak Mountains in Western New Guinea.

What was originally described as Ornithoptera akakeae, is a supposed natural hybrid between Ornithoptera rothschildi and Ornithoptera priamus poseidon.

== History ==
Female

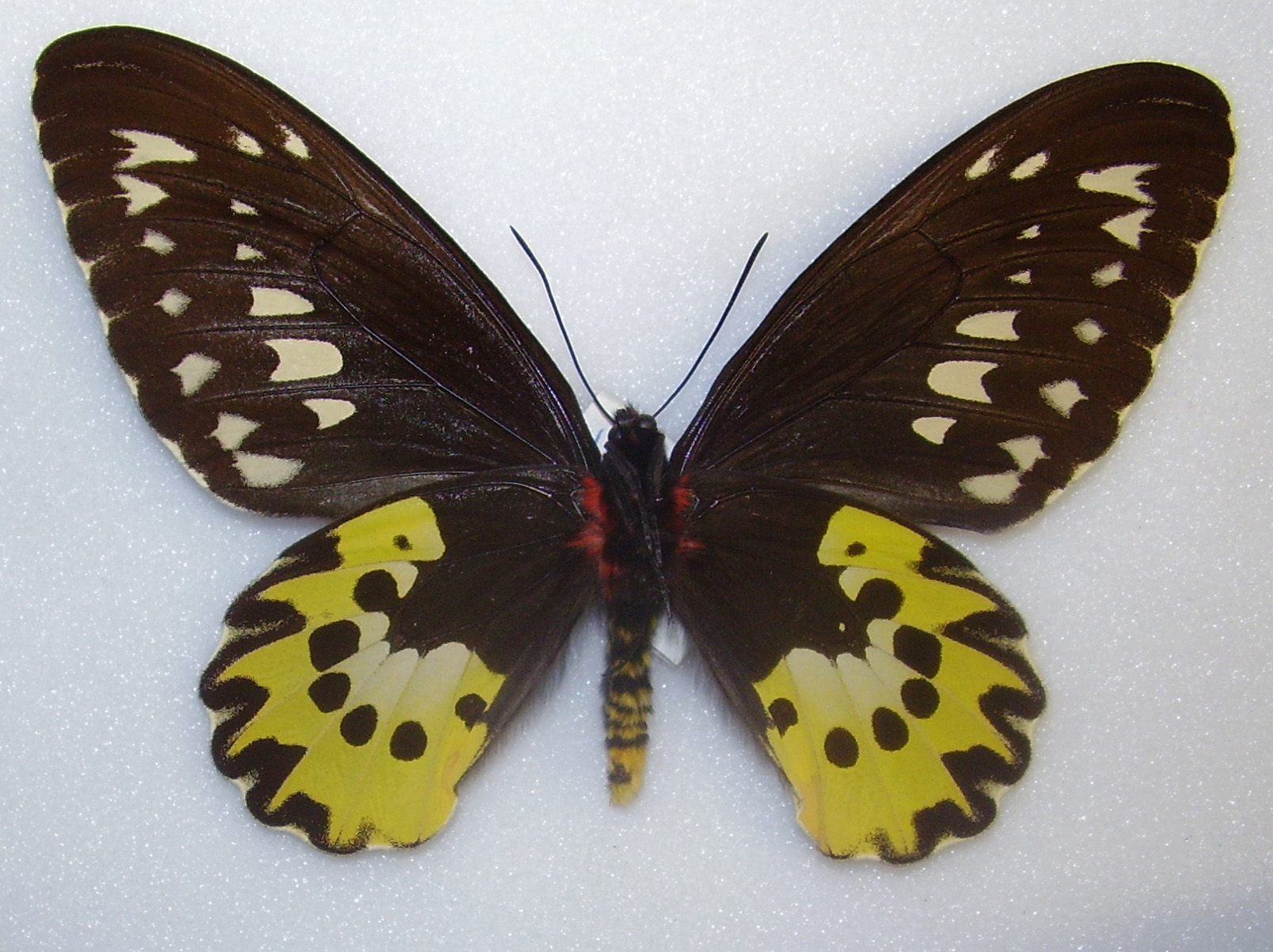
underside

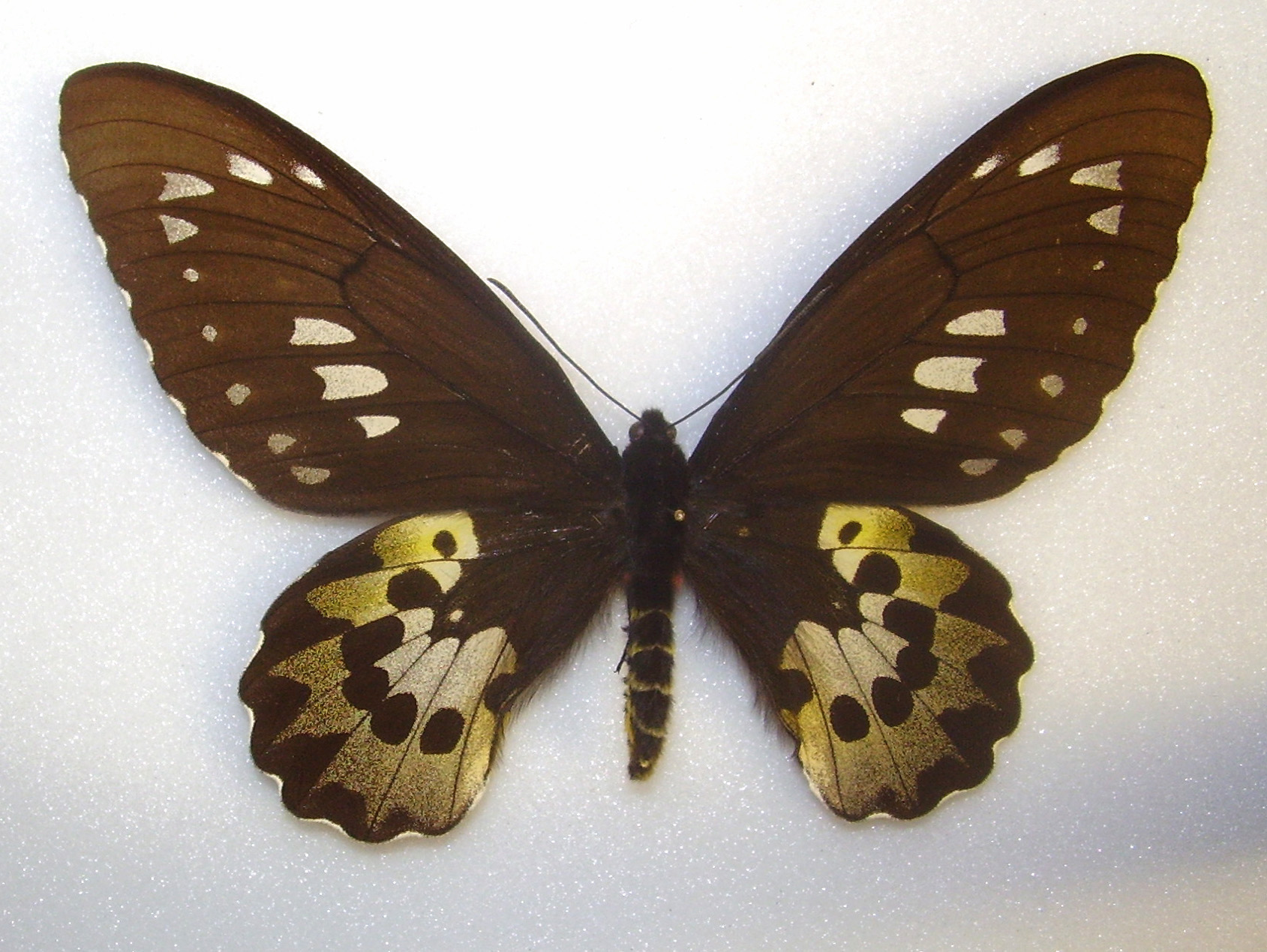
upperside

This species was first recognized by entomologist Charles Edgar Pratt and described by George Kenrick in 1911. It was named in honour of Lord Walter Rothschild who financed most of the expeditions of the naturalist Antwerp Edgar Pratt (1850-1924) and his two sons, Carl Brenders Pratt and Felix Biet Pratt, to British New Guinea from 1902 to 1903 and to the Arfak Mountains of Dutch New Guinea from 1909 to 1910.

== Description ==
The females can reach a wingspan up to 15 centimetres (5.9 in). The forewings are dark brown to blackish brown with creamy white to greyish spots. The hindwings rimmed with black scales and have a central patch of golden with black tips. The abdomen has hairy black rings. The wingspan of the males is approximately 13 cm (5.1 in) and the body length up to 13 cm (5.1 in). The forewings of the males are surrounded with black scales and in the central area with blackish, yellowish-green and yellow scales. The hindwings have black scales on the edge. The central patch is yellow with black tips abutting with smaller spots which are coloured lime green. The abdomen is golden.

Rothschild's Birdwing has the most restricted distribution of all birdwings. Its habitat are flowering meadows in an altitude of 2,000–2,700 metres (6,600–8,900 ft) above sea level.

== Gallery ==
Selection of museum specimens of Rothschild's birdwing
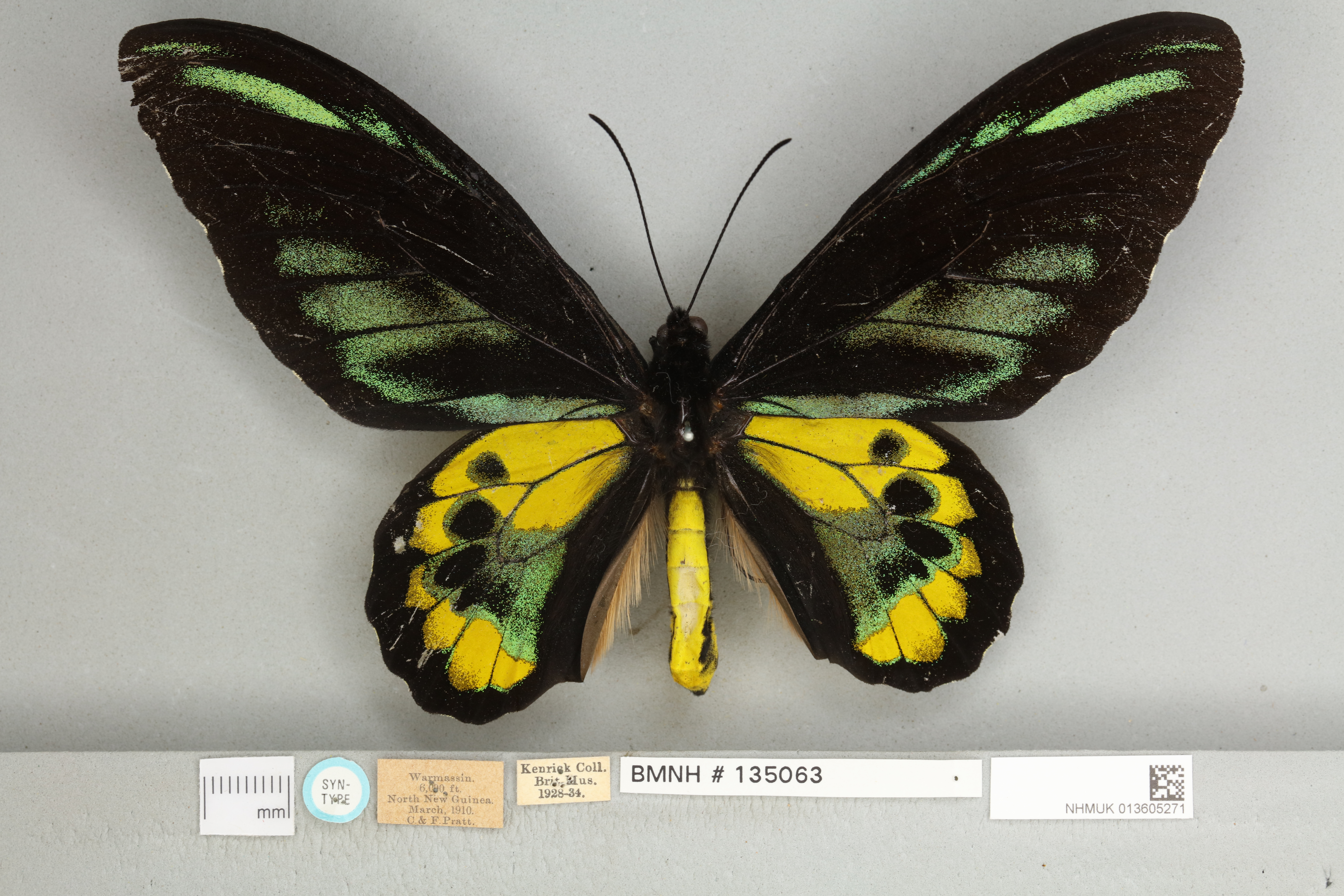
Ornithoptera rothschildi, Syntype male dorsal view

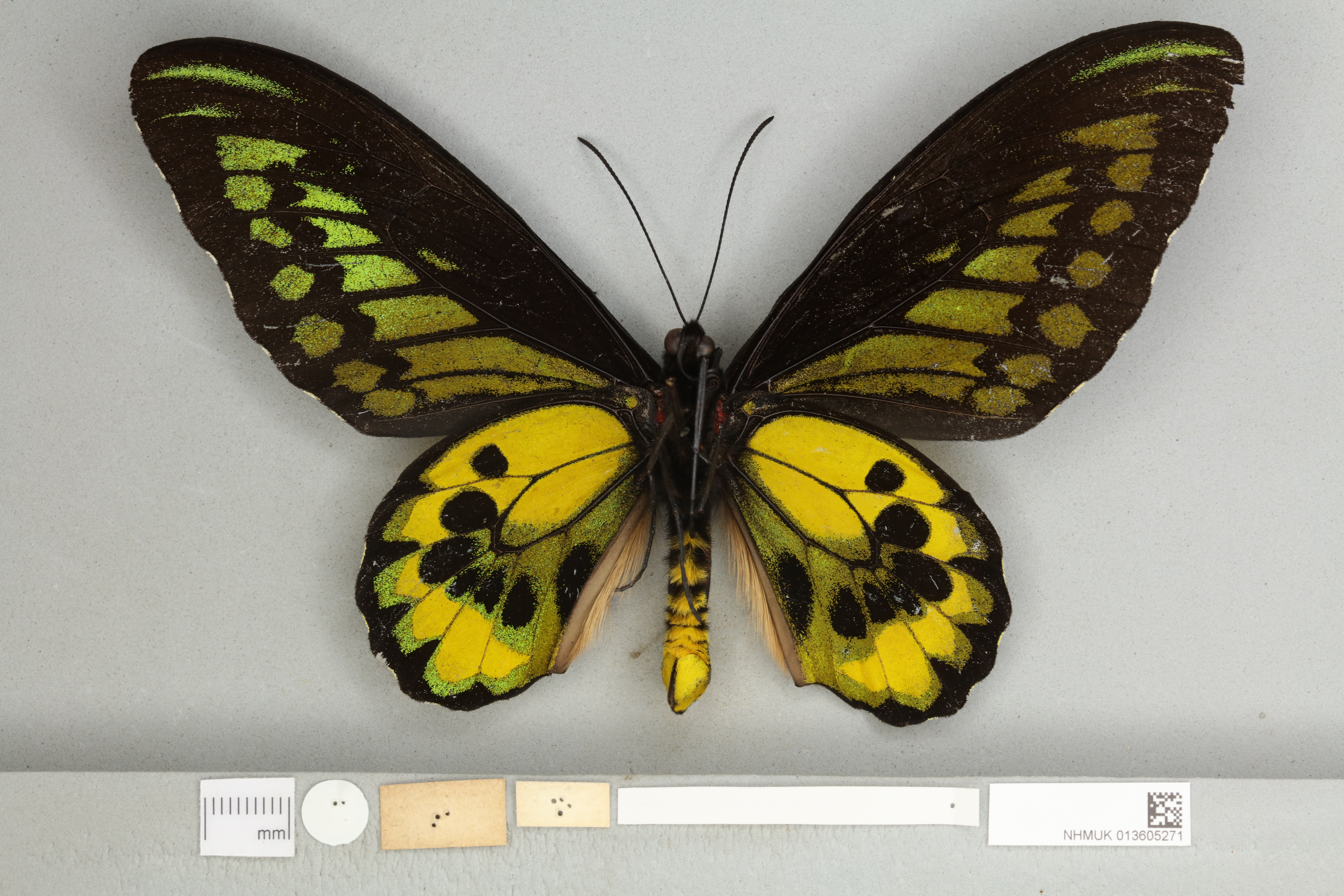
Ornithoptera rothschildi, Syntype male ventral view

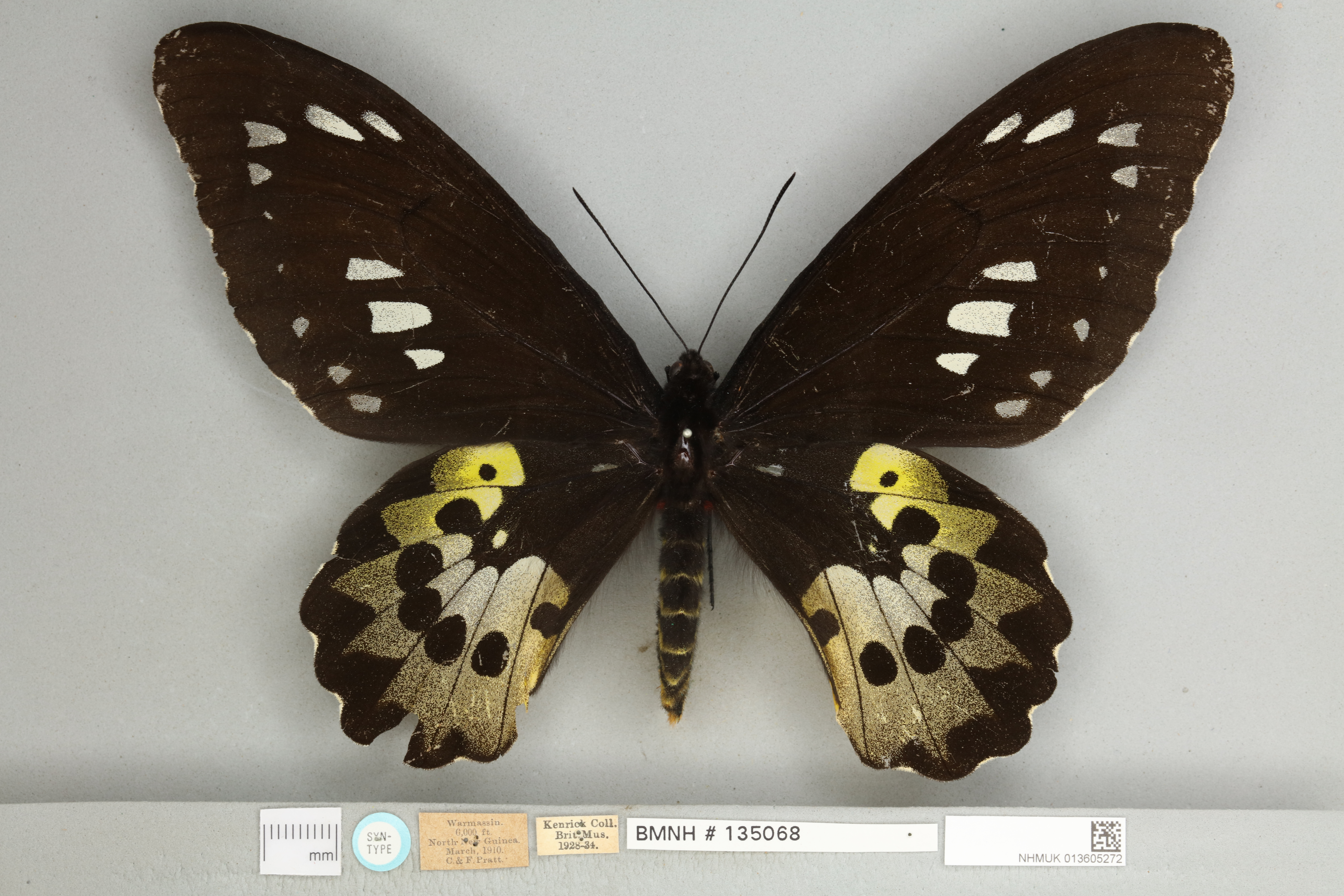
Ornithoptera rothschildi, Syntype female dorsal view

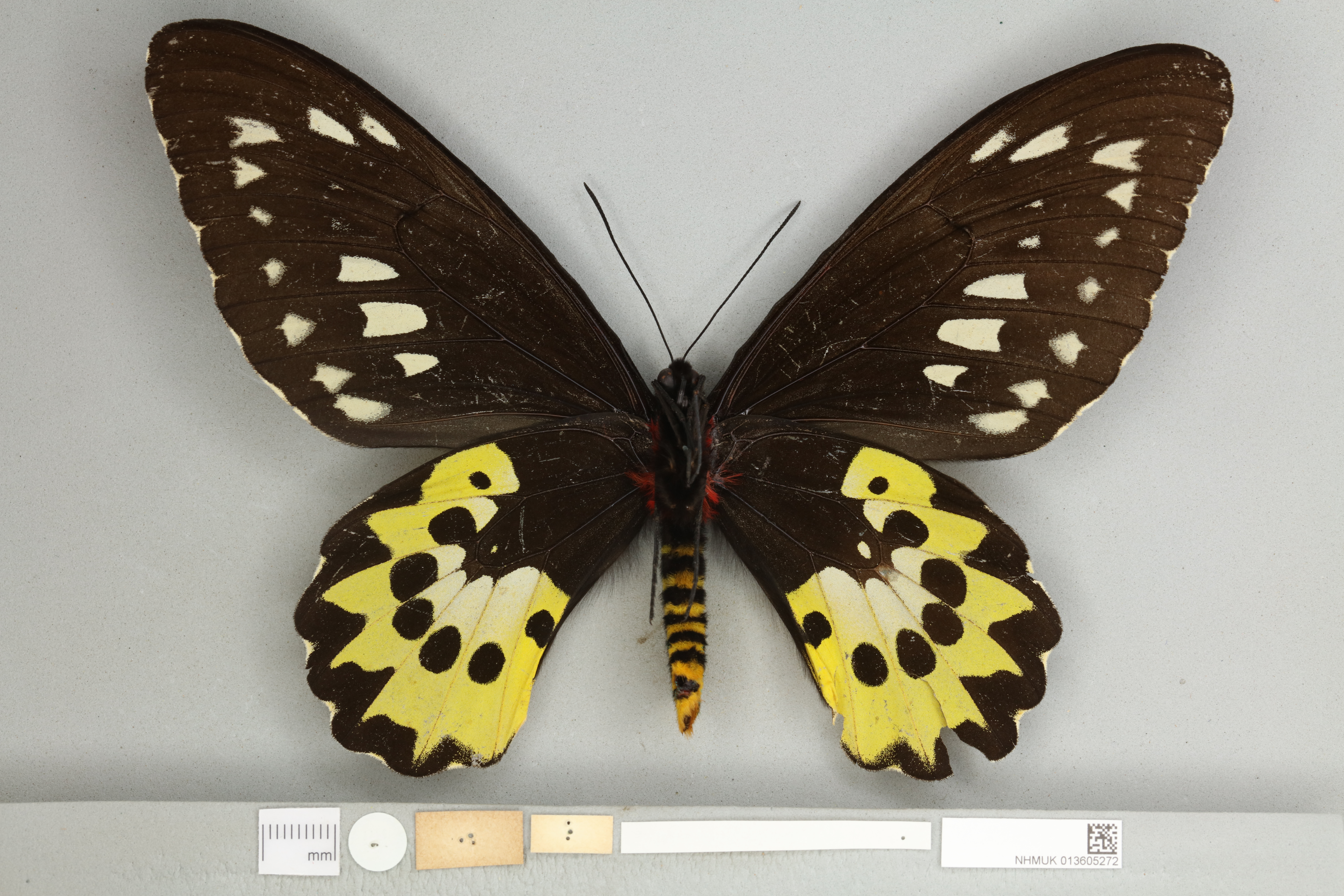
Ornithoptera rothschildi, Syntype female ventral view
