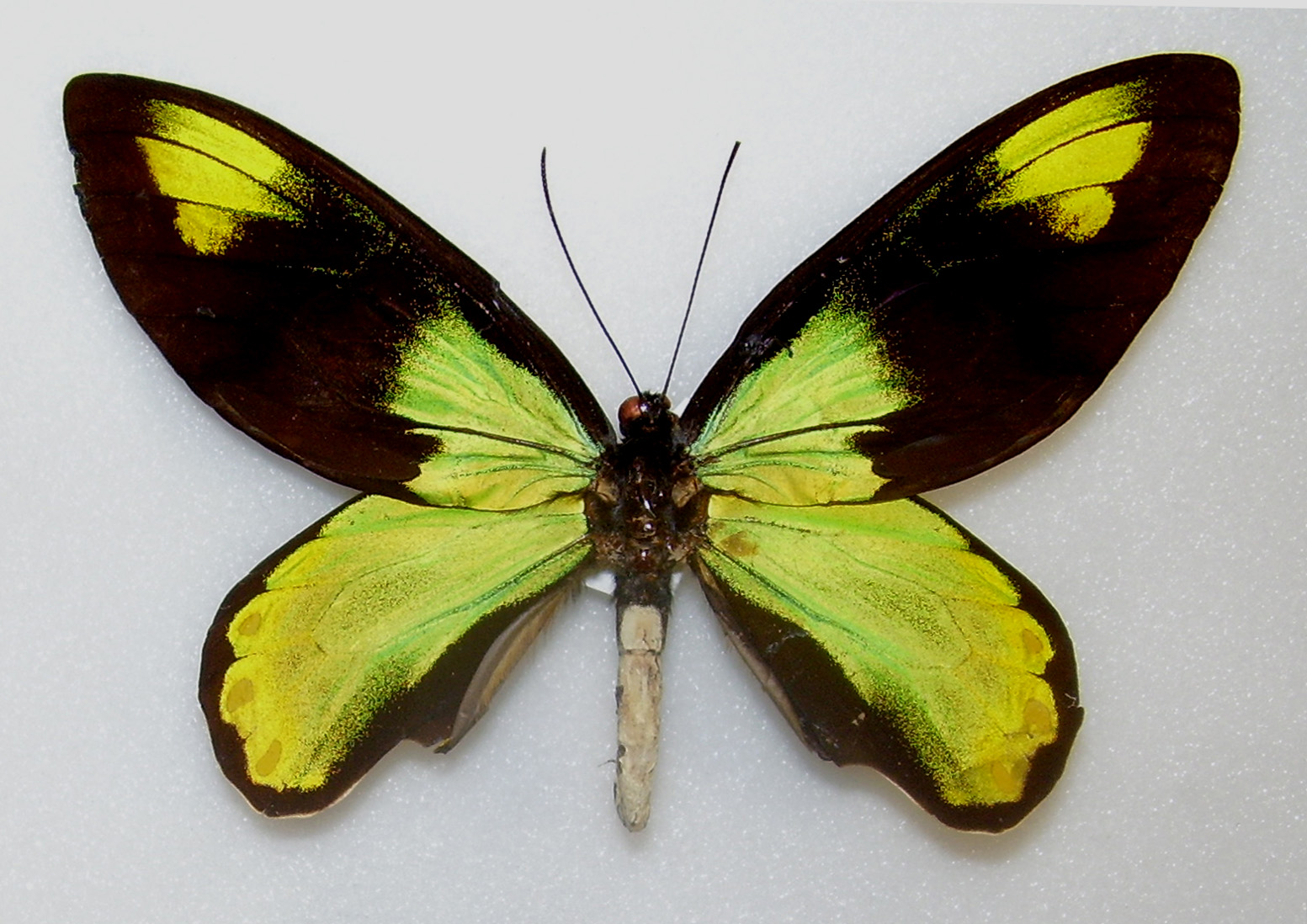
- Male from Guadalcanal, upperside
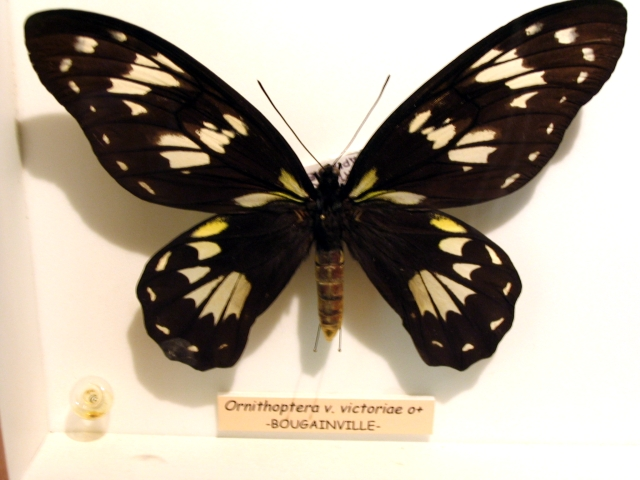
- Female O. v. victoriae, upperside

Conservation status
- CITES Appendix II (CITES)

Scientific classification
- Kingdom: Animalia
- Phylum: Arthropoda
- Class: Insecta
- Order: Lepidoptera
- Family: Papilionidae
- Genus: Ornithoptera
- Subgenus: Aetheoptera; Rippon, 1894
- Species: O. victoriae

Binomial name
- Ornithoptera victoriae Gray, 1856

Synonyms
- Aetheoptera victoriae

= Ornithoptera victoriae =

Queen Victoria's birdwing

Species of birdwing butterfly

Ornithoptera victoriae, the Queen Victoria's birdwing, is a birdwing butterfly of the family Papilionidae, found in the Solomon Islands and Papua New Guinea (Bougainville Island only).

What was originally described as Ornithoptera allotei, is a natural hybrid between Ornithoptera victoriae and Ornithoptera priamus urvillianus.

== History ==
The Queen Victoria's birdwing was described in 1856 by George Robert Gray. Both the scientific and vernacular names were named in honour of Queen Victoria. The holotype now resides in the Natural History Museum, London.

== Description ==
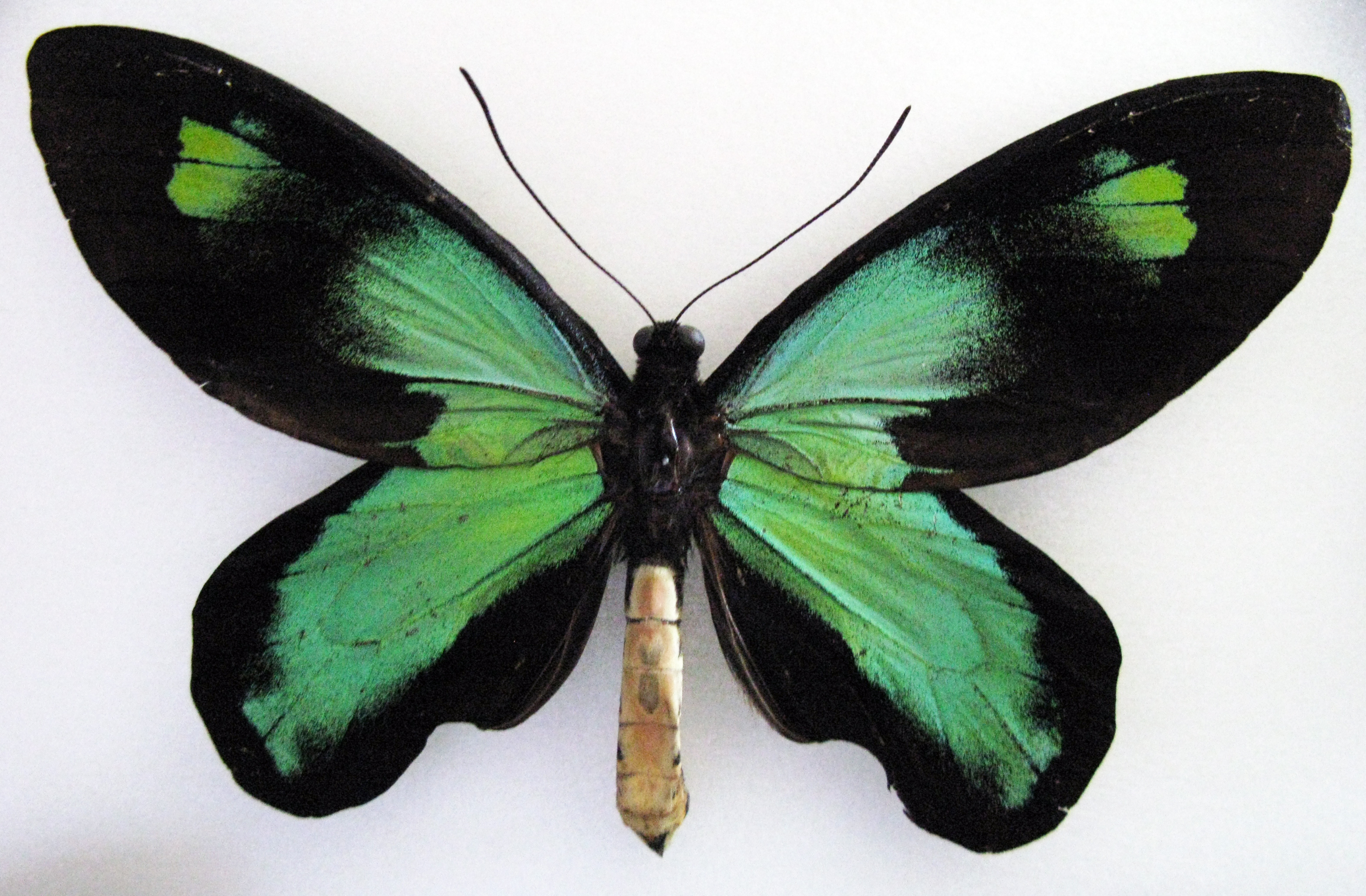
Male O. v. rubianus

Wingspan: 150–180 mm

Male: The forewings are black. Next to the wing tip there is a large, green spot. There is a green area around the thorax. The underside of Ornithoptera victoriae is black. The green spot and the green area are combined. At the wing leading edge there is a large black spot. The veins are black. The hindwings are green. The edge of wing is black. At the outer edge there are three golden spots. The underside is green. The veins are partly black. At the outer edge there are three golden spots. Between these golden spots there are black spots. The ventral side of the wings are of very similar appearance to the dorsal side.

The abdomen is yellowish or white. The head and thorax are black.

Female: The general colour of the female is black or dark brown. There are many white spots on the forewings. Next to the thorax there are two yellow stripes. On the hindwings there are two chains of white marks. There is also one yellow spot. As with the male, the ventral side of the wings are quite similar in appearance to the dorsal side.

Typical of birdwing butterflies, the female covers the upper range of the wingspan. It is significantly larger than the male.

== Subspecies ==
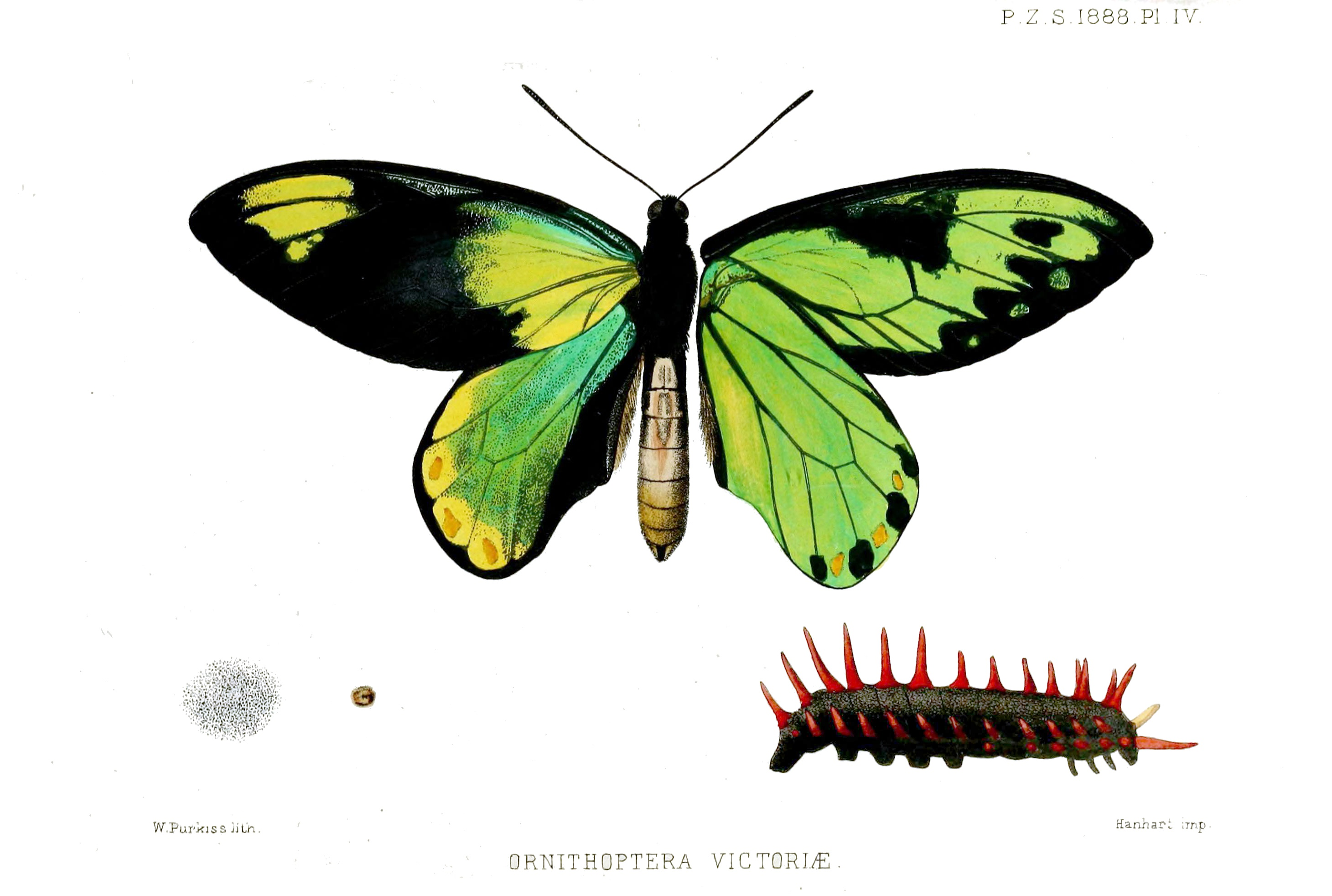
Illustration of male O. v. victoriae with egg and caterpillar

- O. v. archeri [Calderara, 1984]
- O. v. epiphanes [Schmid, 1970]
- O. v. isabellae [Rothschild & Jordan, 1901]
- O. v. maramasikensis [Morita, 2000]
- O. v. reginae [Godman & Salvin, 1888]
- O. v. regis [Rothschild, 1895]
- O. v. rubianus [Rothschild, 1904]
- O. v. victoriae

== Conservation ==
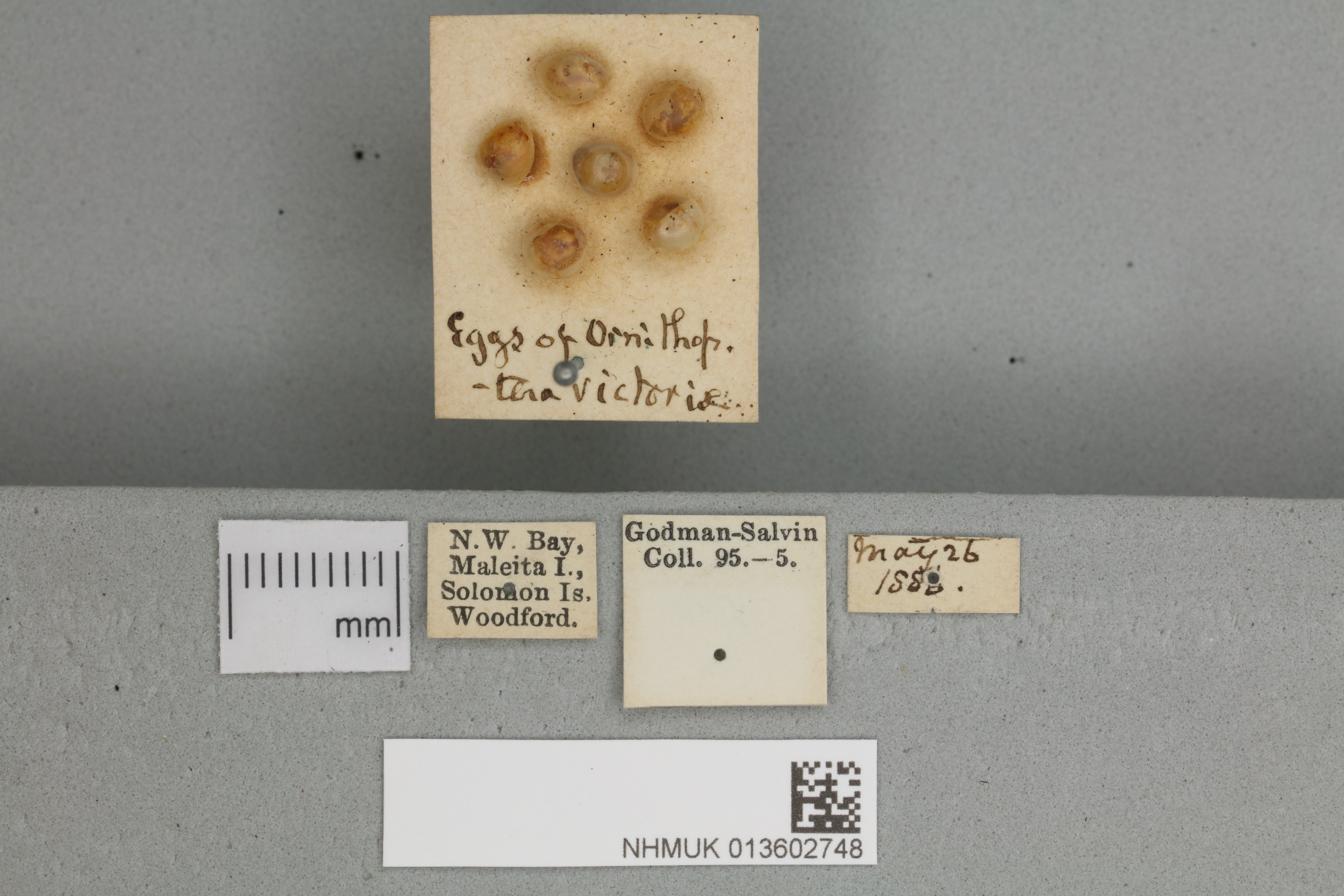
Eggs of Ornithoptera victoriae regis

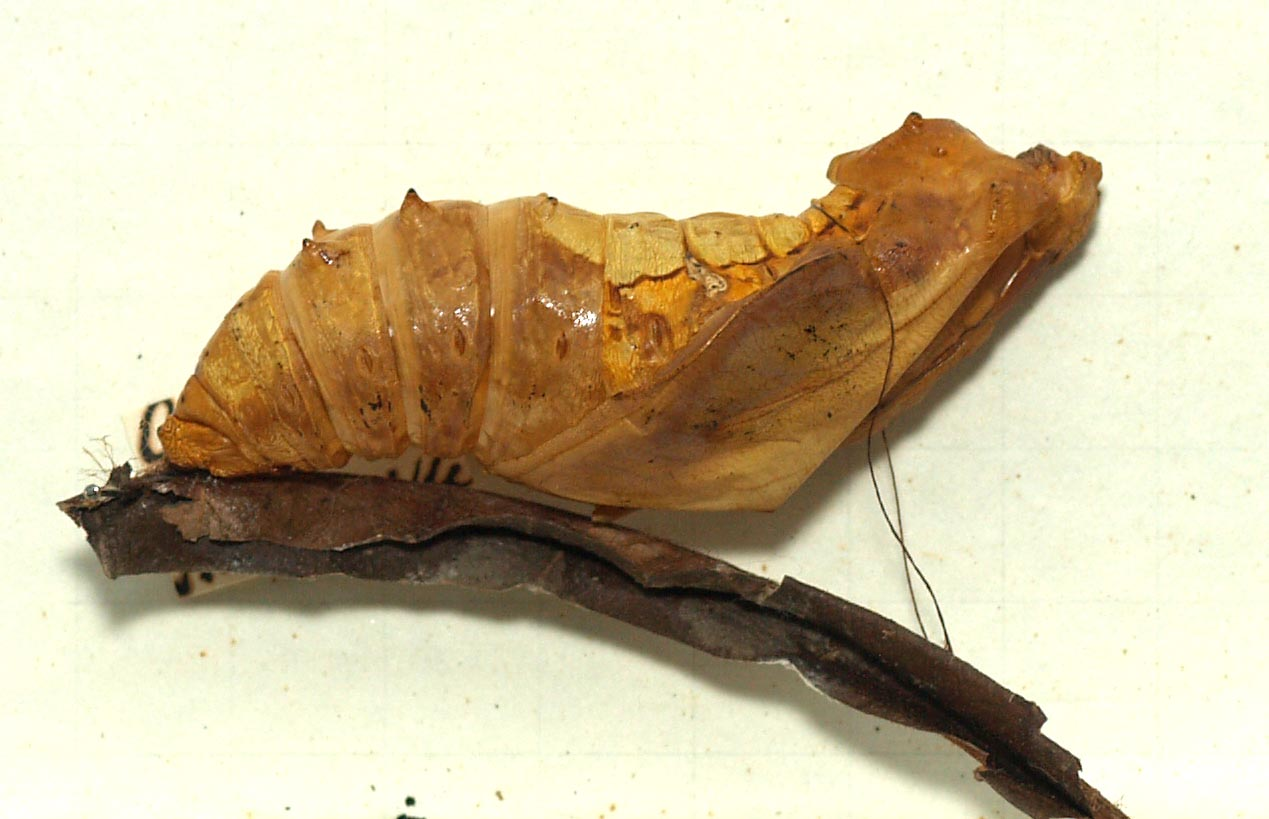
Pupa

The species is not rare, but some populations are declining due to deforestation.

Ornithoptera victoriae is, like all other birdwing butterflies, a strictly protected species. It is listed in Appendix II of CITES, meaning that international trade is restricted to captive-raised specimens. The Solomon Islands, which include a significant part of this species' range, only became a signatory to CITES in 2007, while Papua New Guinea has been a signatory for many years. Despite the fact that the Solomon Islands has engaged the CITES controls, a vestigial United States Fish and Wildlife Service ruling has not been updated and so importation of O. victoriae from the Solomon Islands (but not from Bougainville or Papua New Guinea) to the United States remains prohibited.

== Gallery ==
Selection of museum specimens of Ornithoptera victoriae
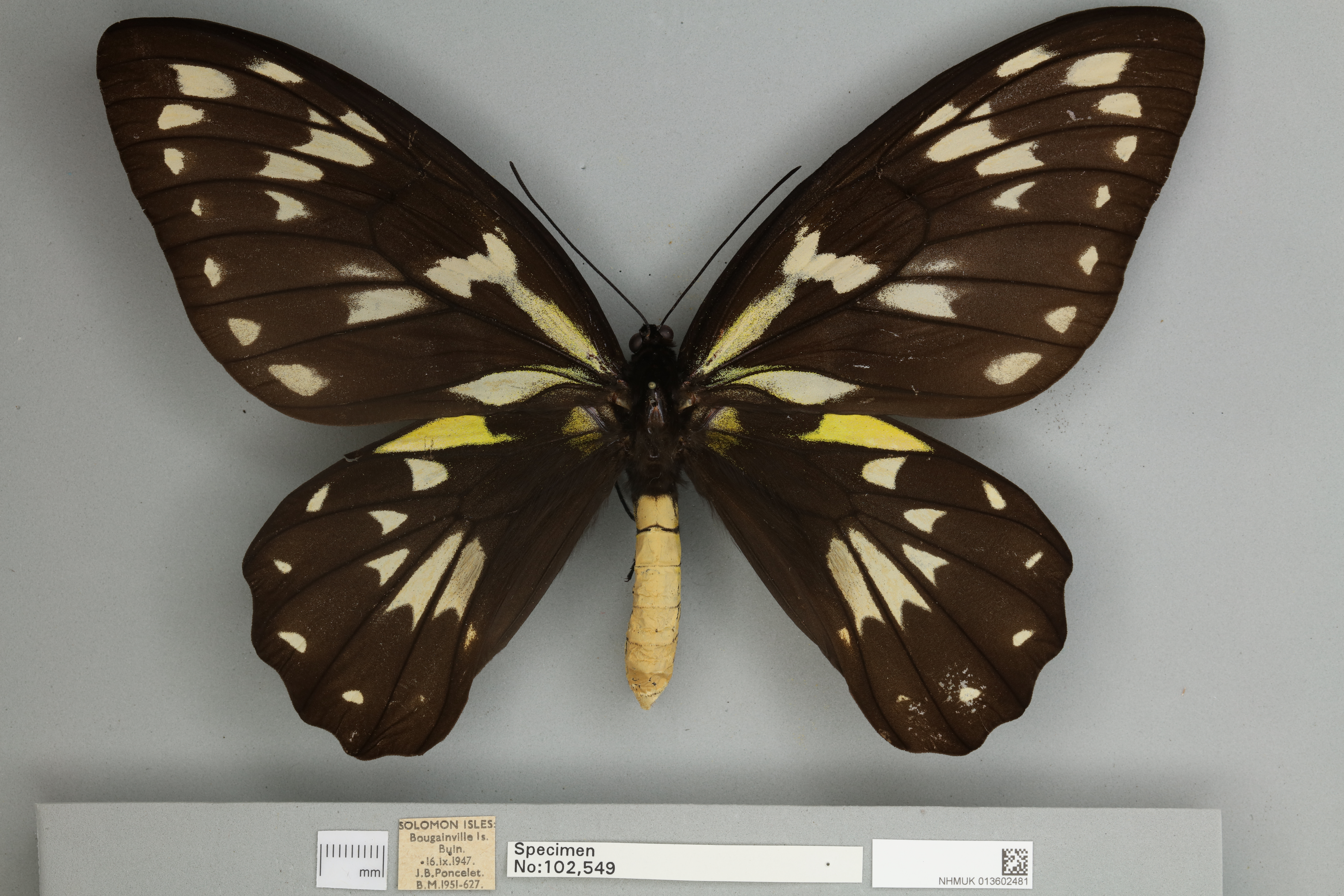
Ornithoptera victoriae regis, female dorsal view

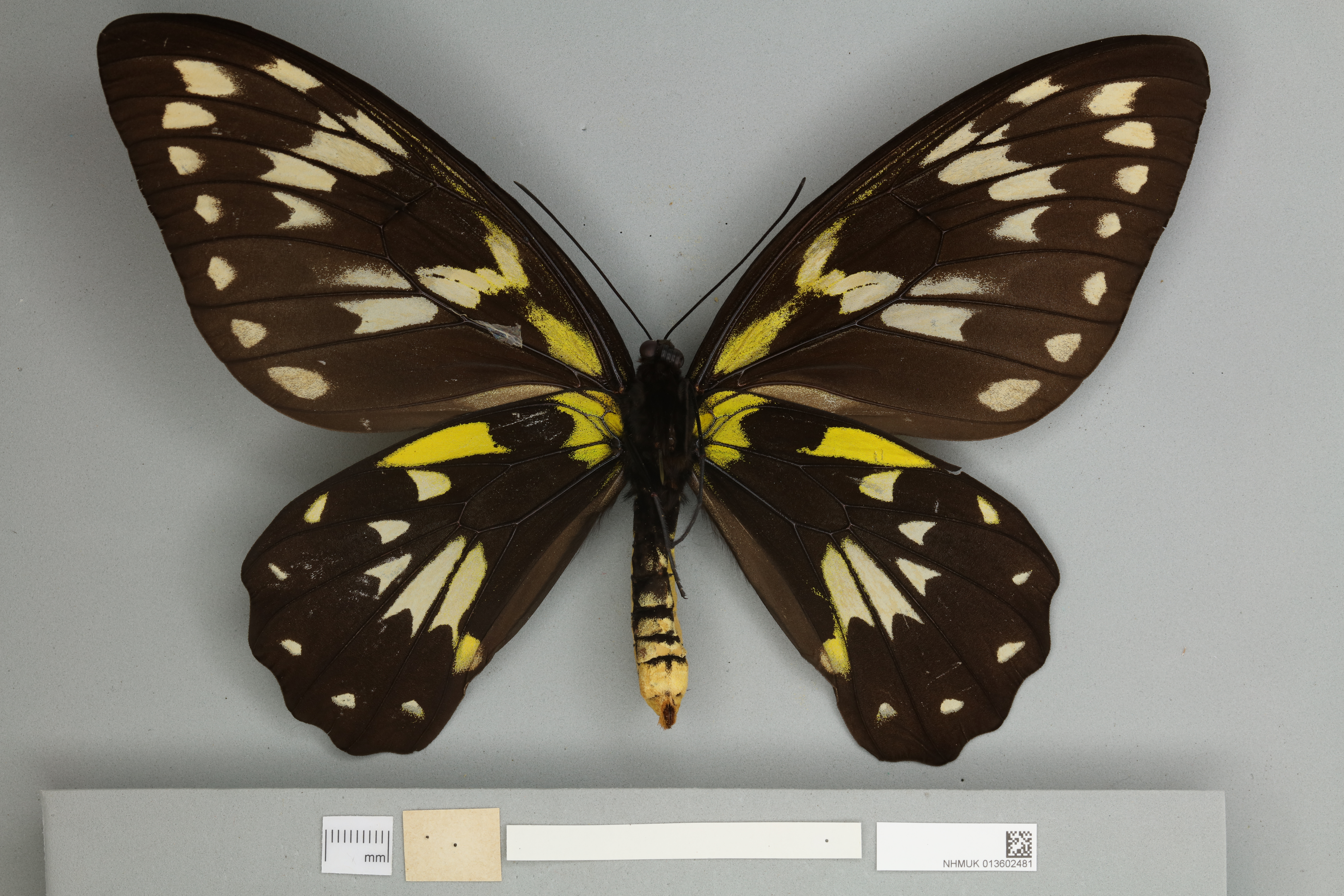
Ornithoptera victoriae regis, female ventral view

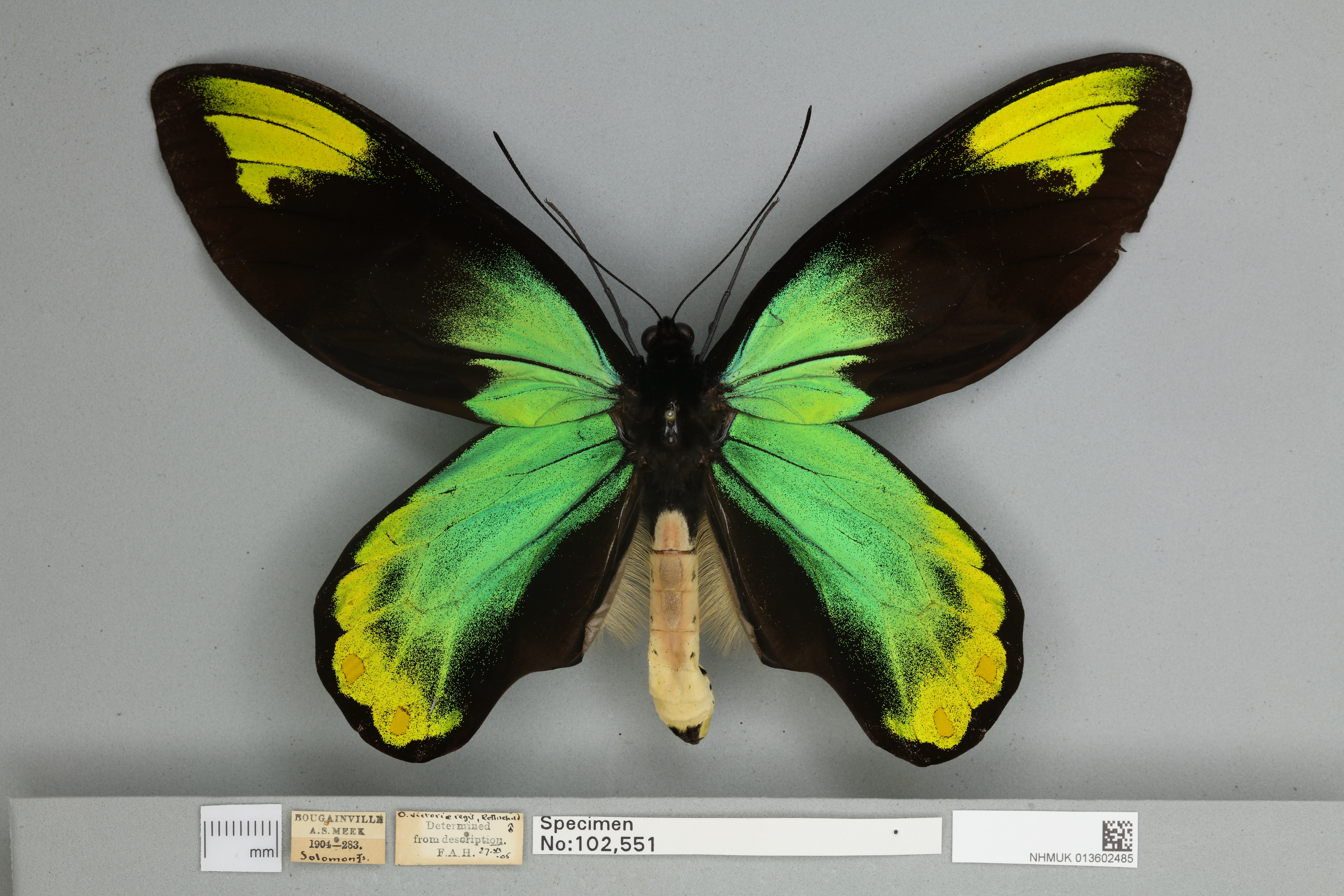
Ornithoptera victoriae regis, male dorsal view

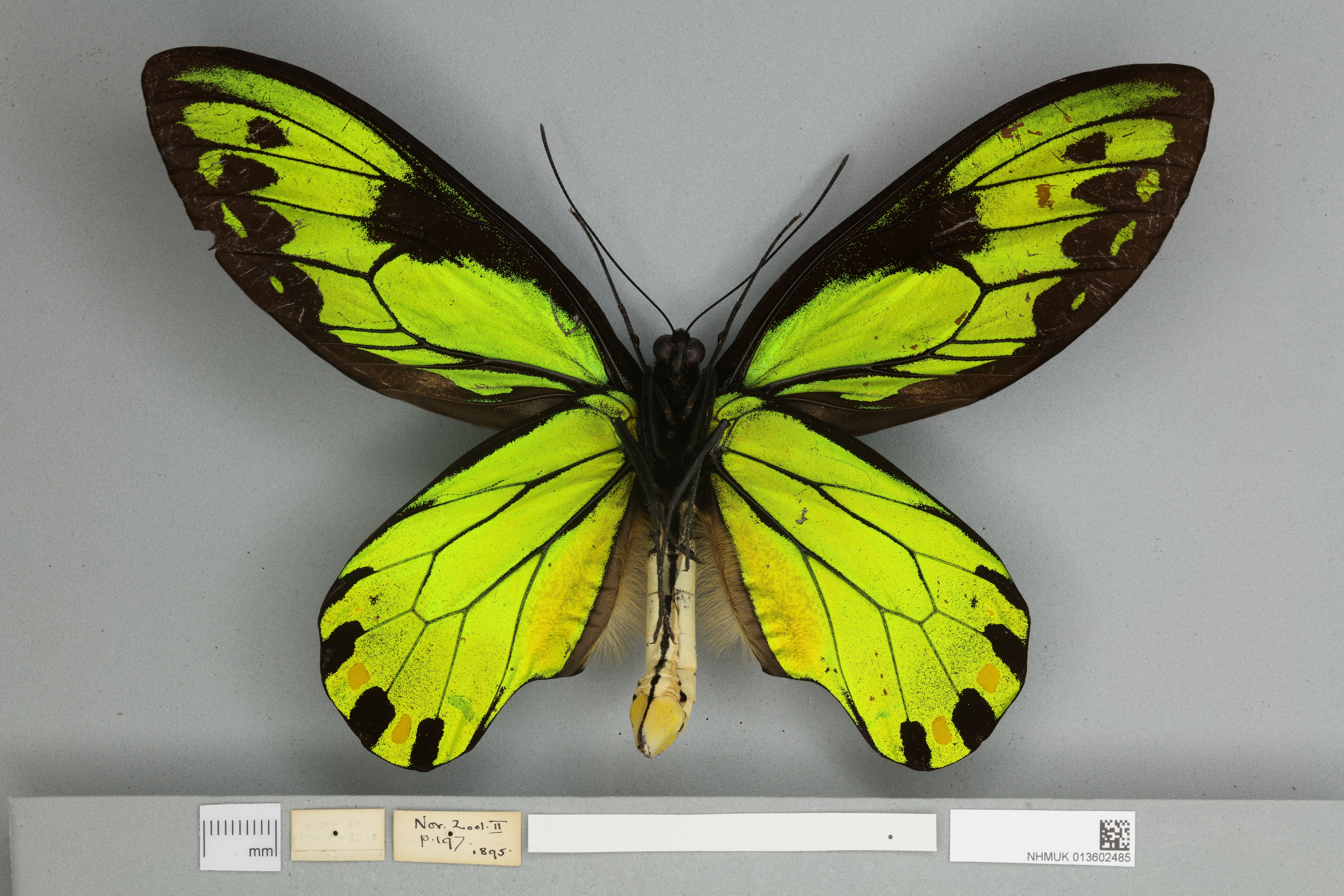
Ornithoptera victoriae regis, male ventral view

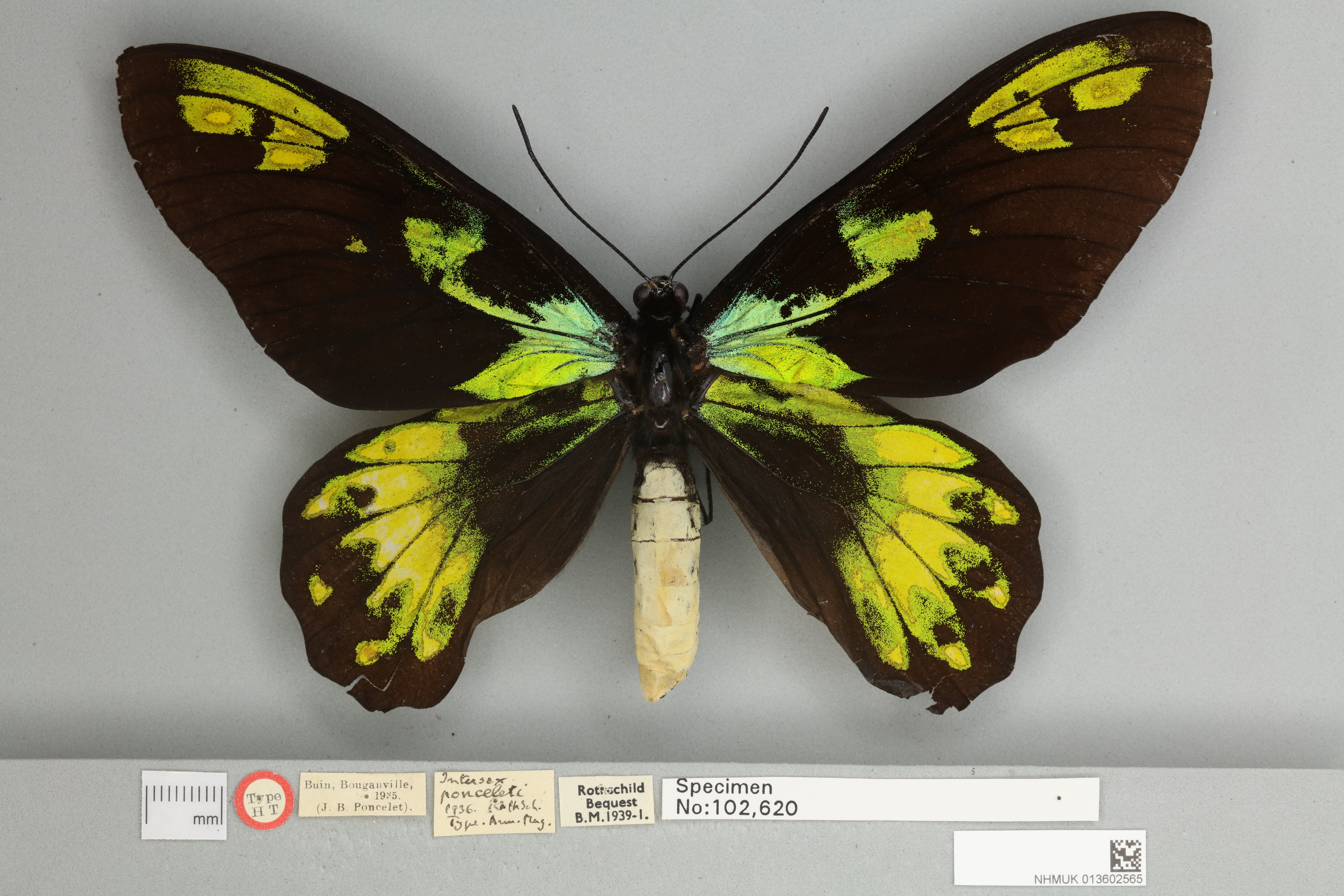
Ornithoptera victoriae regis f.ponceleti, Holotype gynandromorph dorsal view

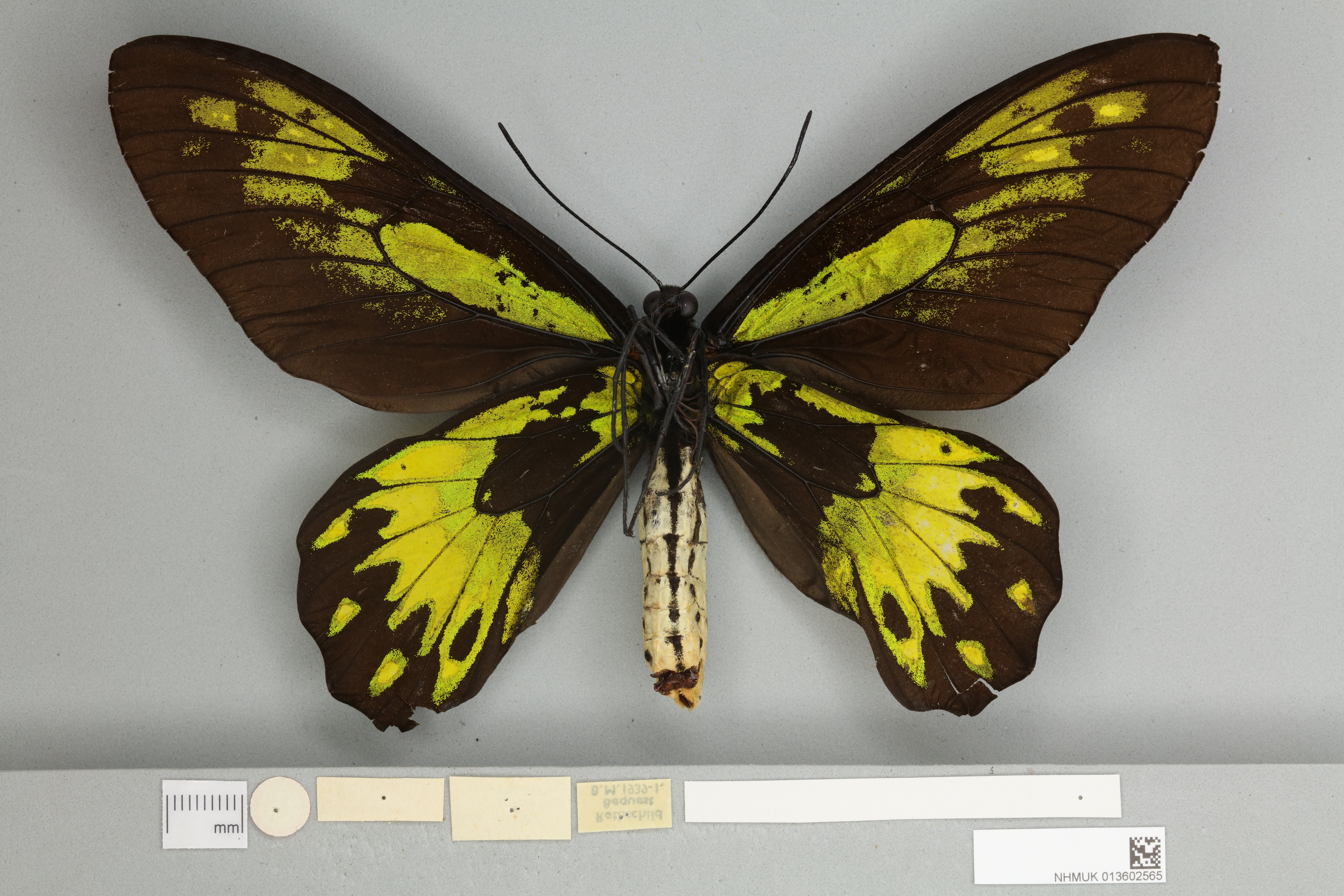
Ornithoptera victoriae regis f.ponceleti, Holotype gynandromorph ventral view

== See also ==
- Solomon Islands rain forests
