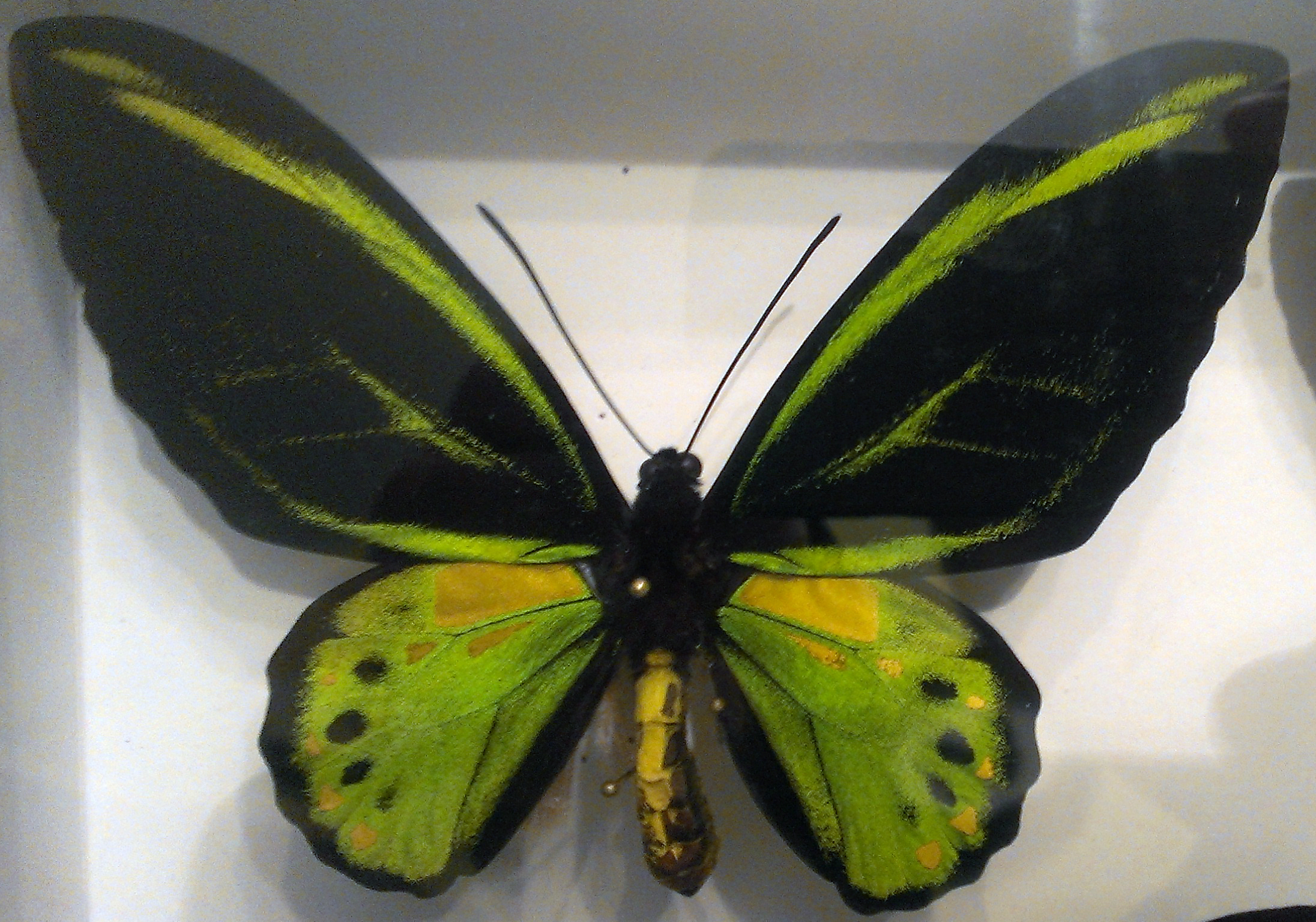

Scientific classification
- Kingdom: Animalia
- Phylum: Arthropoda
- Clade: Pancrustacea
- Class: Insecta
- Order: Lepidoptera
- Family: Papilionidae
- Tribe: Troidini
- Genus: Ornithoptera
- Species: O. rothschildi × O. priamus poseidon

Synonyms
- Ornithoptera akakeae Kobayashi & Koiwaya, 1978

= Ornithoptera akakeae =

Species of butterfly

Ornithoptera akakeae is the name given to a birdwing butterfly that is a natural hybrid between Ornithoptera rothschildi and Ornithoptera priamus poseidon. Despite the fact that hybrids do not warrant a binomial name, the name Ornithoptera akakeae persists from the original description of the butterfly as a species.

It is now being commercially bred.

== History ==
The hybrid was known from a single male specimen that was collected on a mountain near the Arfak Mountains of Papua Province of Indonesia on 19 September 1977 by I. Toeante. In 1978 Kobayashi and Koiwaya, believing that the specimen represented an undiscovered species, described the butterfly as Ornithoptera akakeae.

It was later concluded, however, to be a hybrid between O. rothschildi and O. priamus poseidon by Haugum and Low in 1979.

== See also ==
- Ornithoptera allotei
