= Women's Educational and Industrial Union =

The Women's Educational and Industrial Union (1877–2006) in Boston, Massachusetts, was founded by physician Harriet Clisby for the advancement of women and to help women and children in the industrial city. By 1893, chapters of the WEIU were established in Buffalo and Rochester, New York.

== History ==
In the last part of the 19th century, a dramatic surge in immigration and rapid industrial growth took place in Boston. The exploitation of women and children, crowded housing and poor sanitation, and miserable labor conditions led Dr. Harriet Clisby, one of America's first women physicians, to establish the Women's Educational and Industrial Union in 1877 to respond to these social problems.

Clisby had been holding "Sunday Meetings for Women" in her home since 1872, and it was from these meetings that the WEIU evolved. Men were invited to speak at these meetings but, in 1874, members decided to restrict the meetings to women. "They felt that woman, by her organization, comes into near relation to the Infinite, and is receptive, through her spirituality, of divine truth; that she was well calculated to be the teacher to lead her sisters into that spiritual unfolding that comes to all from true seeking."

In 1903, men were allowed to be associate members of the Union. By the beginning of the 20th century, the Women's Union had established itself as one of Boston's primary service providers and advocacy organizations. Many of the city's most prominent women, including Abby Morton Diaz, Louisa May Alcott, and Julia Ward Howe, were involved with the Union's early history.

- In 1877, the Women's Union opened a store to help women support themselves and their families by selling crafts and foodstuffs which they produced in their homes. The Shop at the Union, which closed in June 2004, carried gifts, cards, jewelry, apparel and specialty items, many of which were created by women artists and women-owned companies.
- In 1878, the Protective Committee was formed to provide free legal advice to poor and uninformed workers and to call attention to the legal rights of women and children. In 1921, the Massachusetts Legal Aid Society assumed this work, after the Union stipulated that the Society hire a female attorney.
- In 1899, The Women's Union began an employment-training program for the adult blind and collected Braille books for the Boston Public Library. Four years later, the Union initiated a successful lobbying campaign to create the Massachusetts Commission for the Blind. Mary Morton Kehew, then President of the Union, persuaded Helen Keller to speak to the Boston General Court about the importance of education for the blind.
- In 1905, The Women's Union began a retail training program, equipping women with skills in purchasing, accounting, and general salesmanship. Large retailers such as Filene's and Jordan Marsh hired the graduates for $6 per week. Simmons College adopted this program in 1917; it continues with updates as the Prince Program in Retail Management.
- In 1907, The Women's Union took charge of the nation's first hot lunch program for public schools. Until 1944, the Union prepared up to 18,000 lunches every day for Boston public school students.
- In 1910, The Women's Union established the Appointment Bureau, known nationally for its vocational advising and placement of college educated women in fields other than teaching. The aviator Amelia Earhart sought job placement here two years before her historic flight over the Atlantic. Since then, The Women's Union has provided career and job help to hundreds of thousands of people.
- In 1913, The Women's Union opened the country's first credit union.
- In 1916, The Women's Union opened the Bookshop for Boys and Girls. The Bookshop published the Horn Book, the first publication in the United States to review children's books. The Horn Book was subsequently adopted by the federal government to help with book selection for elementary schools.
- In 1930, The Women's Union founded the Bureau of the Handicapped to provide training and employment for the physically handicapped. The Massachusetts Rehabilitation Commission oversees this area today.
- In 1965, The Women's Union published The Guide to Nursing and Rest Homes in Massachusetts. This valuable resource has been updated periodically and is now known as the Guide to Long-Term Care Alternatives in Massachusetts.
- In 1966, The Women's Union established the Homemaker Training Program in collaboration with the Boston Public Welfare Department.
- In 1967, The Women's Union began the Companions Unlimited program to provide visiting services for the elderly and adult disabled. In 1994, the Companions Unlimited friendly visiting program was adopted by MATCH-UP, Inc.
- In 1970, The Women's Union instituted the Family Day Care Program to train women and men to become licensed home day care providers. The program was taken over by Family Day Care of Brookline and is still operating today.
- In 1982, The Women's Union began the Amelia Earhart Award to honor a woman who has significantly contributed to the expansion of opportunities for women. This award is presented annually.
- In 1985, The Women's Union launched Massachusetts' first comprehensive transitional housing program for homeless and/or battered women with children. The Horizons Housing Program is based on self-help, self-esteem, skill building, and goal setting, with the aim of independent living for the family.
- In 1992, The Women's Union implemented a job training program for employment advisers, with the goal of equipping career changers, new entrants to the job market, and unemployed workers with the skills to provide job counseling to job changers.
- In 1995, The Women's Union undertook an intensive strategic planning process. The Plan for the Year 2000 renewed the Union's emphasis on advocacy for women and their families, and commits the Union's programs to the continued promotion of opportunities for all women.
- In 1996, The Women's Union successfully opened the Boston Career Link, one of Massachusetts' first One-Stop Career Centers, in partnership with Dimock Community Health Center and Morgan Memorial Goodwill Industries. The Union also initiated plans for its new Work and Family Resource Center.
- In 1997, The Women's Union initiated "To Market, To Market" through The Shop at the Union. This economic and community development project provides women in all stages of product development with technical assistance and market access.
- In 1998, The Women's Union launched the Massachusetts Family Economic Self-Sufficiency (MassFESS) Project, a statewide coalition of organizations working to help families thrive. MassFESS released The Self-Sufficiency Standard for Massachusetts, to measure the real costs of living, working and paying taxes in the Commonwealth without subsidies.
- In 2000, The Women's Union published The Self-Sufficiency Standard: Where Massachusetts Families Stand, to make the case for helping those families achieve a family-sustaining income.
- In 2001, The Women's Union launched its Woman to Woman program, offering professional development and mentoring to low-income mothers to help them gain economic self-sufficiency while strengthening their families.
- In 2004, The Women's Union relocated to Government Center in a space that houses all program and advocacy offices, training facilities for home health care workers, conference rooms, and an on-site technology training center, which will accommodate up to 16 participants at one time.

=== The Amelia Earhart Award ===
In 1926, Amelia Earhart came to The Women’s Union for employment assistance and was placed as a social worker in a Boston immigrant settlement house. At the same time, she continued to pursue her interest in flying. In 1928, this former Union client became the first woman to cross the Atlantic in an airplane.

The Amelia Earhart Award was established in 1982 to recognize a woman who continues the pioneering spirit of Amelia Earhart. Each year, the award honors a woman who has significantly contributed to the expansion of opportunities for women.

Past Honorees:

- 2009 – Barbara Lynch
- 2008 - Suze Orman
- 2006 - Anna Quindlen
- 2005 - Susan Hockfield
- 2004 - Doris Kearns Goodwin
- 2003 - Marian Wright Edelman
- 2002 - Ruth Simmons
- 2001 - Liz Walker
- 2000 - Gwen Ifill
- 1999 - Julia Child
- 1998 - Evelyn Murphy
- 1997 - Eileen Moran Brown
- 1996 - Judge Joyce London Alexander
- 1995 - Elizabeth K. Levin
- 1993 - Deborah Jackson
- 1992 - Dr. Jane Schaller
- 1990 - Jovita Fontanez
- 1989 - Caroline Chang
- 1988 - Dr. Diane Balser
- 1987 - Dr. Deborah Prothrow-Stith
- 1986 - Juliet Brudney
- 1985 - Dr. Margaret Hennig and Dr. Anne Jardim
- 1984 - Jan Verhage
- 1983 - Dr. Brunetta Wolfman
- 1982 - Sharyn Bahn

=== Merger in 2006 ===
In July 2006, the WEIU merged with Crittenton, Inc. to form Crittenton Women's Union, to better meet the needs of low-income women and their families.

== See also ==
- Women's Rest Tour Association
- Crittenton Women's Union

== Sources ==
- Harth, Erica (Summer 1999). "Founding Mothers of Social Justice: The Women's Educational and Industrial Union of Boston, 1877–1892" (PDF). Historical Journal of Massachusetts. 27 (2).
