= Antony Peebles =

British musician

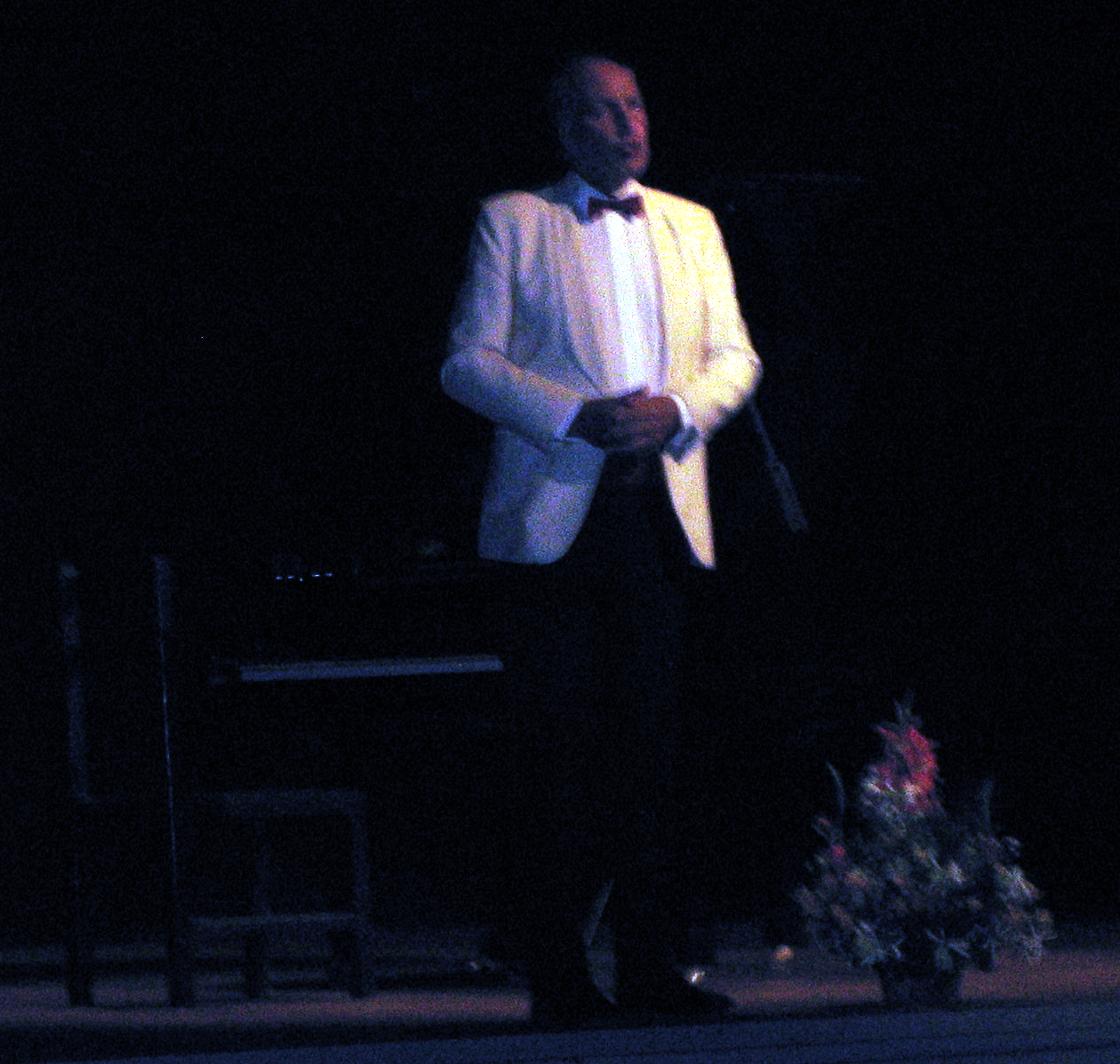
Peebles at a concert in Kigali, Rwanda.

Antony Peebles is a British concert pianist. He won the 1971 BBC Piano competition and has performed in 131 different countries around the world.

== Biography ==
Antony Peebles studied at Westminster School and Trinity College, Cambridge, from which he was awarded a MusB degree. After leaving university, Peebles studied the piano with various tutors including Peter Katin, Yvonne Lefébure and Jeremy Siepmann. He received a number of scholarships during this time.

Peebles' big break came in 1971, when he was awarded the BBC Piano Competition. He played Gaspard de la nuit by Maurice Ravel, receiving universal acclaim from the jury, including renowned pianist Vlado Perlemuter, who commented that he'd never heard the piece interpreted better. Peebles also won the French Claude Debussy competition in 1972.

Following these successes, Peebles became a regular concert pianist, both as a performer of concertos with major orchestras in the United Kingdom and, famously, by touring the world playing the piano - sometimes alone, and sometimes with violinist John Georgiadis, with whom he formed the Georgiadis/Peebles Duo. Peebles has now performed in 131 countries. Peebles has recorded five CDs of piano music, all with Meridian Records.

== Discography ==
Year	Title	Composer(s)	Tracks
1991	Ravel Piano Music	Maurice Ravel	Gaspard de la nuit
1991	Ravel Piano Music	Maurice Ravel	Miroirs
1991	Ravel Piano Music	Maurice Ravel	Sonatine
1991	Ravel Piano Music	Maurice Ravel	Pavane pour une infante défunte
1994	Liszt Fantasias & Transcriptions	Franz Liszt	Reminiscences de Lucrezia Borgia (Donizetti) no 1
1994	Liszt Fantasias & Transcriptions	Franz Liszt	Reminiscences de Lucrezia Borgia (Donizetti) no 2
1994	Liszt Fantasias & Transcriptions	Franz Liszt	Grand Concert Fantasy on La Sonnambula (Bellini)
1994	Liszt Fantasias & Transcriptions	Franz Liszt	Illustrations du Prophète (Meyerbeer) no 1
1994	Liszt Fantasias & Transcriptions	Franz Liszt	Fantasy on motives from The Ruins of Athens (Beethoven)
1994	Liszt Fantasias & Transcriptions	Franz Liszt	March to the Scaffold from Symphonie fantastique (Berlioz)
1998	Schubert Songs Transcribed by Liszt vol. 1	Franz Schubert, Franz Liszt	12 Songs by Fr. Schubert, trans. 1838 (includes Erlkönig, Gretchen am Spinnrade, Du bist die Ruh', Ave Maria, etc.)
1998	Schubert Songs Transcribed by Liszt vol. 1	Franz Schubert, Franz Liszt	Four songs from Schwanengesang
2001	Schubert Songs Transcribed by Liszt vol. 2	Franz Schubert, Franz Liszt	Seven songs from Die schöne Müllerin
2001	Schubert Songs Transcribed by Liszt vol. 2	Franz Schubert, Franz Liszt	10 songs from Schwanengesang
2004	Schubert Songs Transcribed by Liszt vol. 3	Franz Schubert, Franz Liszt	12 songs from Winterreise
2004	Schubert Songs Transcribed by Liszt vol. 3	Franz Schubert, Franz Liszt	Six individual songs, including The Trout
