= Women's Rest Tour Association =

The Women's Rest Tour Association of Boston, Massachusetts comprised a network of middle-class members who collected information about travel abroad and shared it among like-minded American women who required trustworthy non-commercial and unsolicited confidential recommendations suitable for women "who desire to visit Europe at the least possible expense consistent with comfort". Comfort, decency and security for the unaccompanied female traveller were essential, but picturesqueness and historical settings were also prominently featured in the brief commentaries that were submitted by the members, who had to be recommended by two existing members in order to join.

The origin of the Association was reported in Publishers Weekly for 12 November 1892, with the publication of a second edition of A Summer in England: a handbook for the use of American women:

In the spring of 1891 several women, who had made a summer trip across the Atlantic, and discovered that foreign travel was far easier and cheaper than they had imagined, resolved to offer other self dependent women who might be deterred from such a journey either by the expense involved or by the lack of an escort, the results of their own experience. They therefore formed themselves into a society called the Women's Rest Tour Association, which published a handbook of hints and directions called "a summer in England."

The second edition of 1892 added an article on "Universal Extension and the advantages for summer study in the universities of England" and a "Continental supplement", which initiated the annual publication of the members' copiously annotated lists of recommended pensioni, charming but inexpensive restaurants and small hotels, which were subsequently published, in an American list and a foreign list, in alternate years, for many decades. Negative reports, or several years passing without a review, resulted in a listing's being dropped, a self-editing feature.

Among the practical hints offered for self-dependent American women in 1892, were some familiar social suggestions:

Independent as you may be, do not scorn to imitate one grace of the English woman, be she duchess or chambermaid—her soft, low voice, that excellence which no American woman has attained in its infinitude of sweetness. Listen to it, delight in it, and copy it if you can"

Later editions dropped the social advice and kept closer to the commentary on lodgings and restaurants, listed city by city, eventually covering the visitable world, from Aden to Zanzibar.

The Women's Rest Tour Association was part of the Women's Educational and Industrial Union, a broader non-profit social and educational agency founded in Boston in 1877.
