= Harriet Clisby =

English physician and women's rights activist (1830–1931)

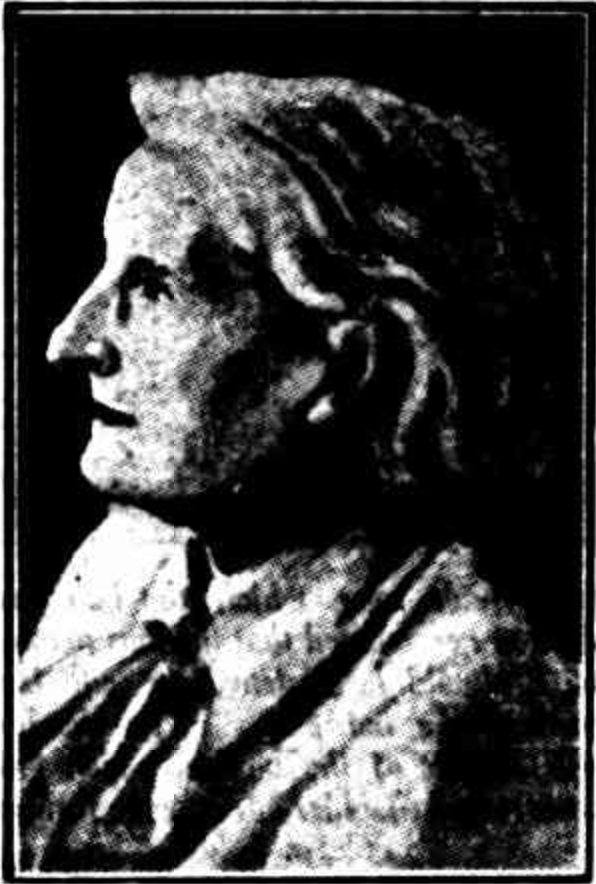
- Born: Harriet Jemima Winifred Clisby; 31 August 1830; London, England
- Died: 30 April 1931 (aged 100); London, England
- Other name: Harriet Walker
- Education: New York Medical College and Hospital for Women
- Known for: founding of the WEIU
- Spouse: Henry Edward Walker

Harriet Clisby (31 August 1830 – 30 April 1931) was an English physician, women's rights activist, and founder of the Women's Educational and Industrial Union in Boston.

== Early life ==
Harriet Jemima Winifred Clisby was born in St. James's, London, in 1830, and moved with her parents and two siblings to Adelaide, South Australia, when she was eight years old. She married sailor Henry Edward Walker on 25 February 1848.

Clisby was a vegetarian from 1847, the same year in which she became a member of the Swedenborgian New Church. She also practiced gymnastics.

== Career ==
While in her twenties she moved to Melbourne, where she worked as a magazine editor for the Southern Phonographic Harmonia and, with Caroline Dexter co-published The Interpreter, the first Australian magazine published by women. She also organized a community home for the rehabilitation of women prisoners in 1858.

Inspired by Elizabeth Blackwell's 1852 book on women's health, Clisby decided to study medicine. She traveled to England and studied nursing at Guy's Hospital, where she met with Elizabeth Garrett Anderson, a prominent woman physician and hospital founder who advised her to train in the United States. With a friend's financial support, Clisby trained at the New York Medical College and Hospital for Women, graduating in 1865.

In 1871, Clisby moved to Boston, where she practiced homeopathy and lectured on hygiene. Clisby wrote a series of travel writings about Australia for the Woman's Journal, a Boston-based woman suffrage newspaper edited by Lucy Stone and Henry B. Blackwell, in 1873. The "Sketches of Australia" reflected on the young Clisby's immigration to and early life in Australia.

In 1877, while still living in Boston, Clisby and several friends founded the Women's Educational and Industrial Union to address the problems of poor women, especially unemployed immigrants. In a large building on Boylston Street, women could take English language lessons, learn millinery, dressmaking, and needlework, and obtain free legal advice. Later the WEIU provided job placement services and training for domestic and retail work, and eventually established a women's credit union. The WEIU remained in operation well into the 20th century, providing many of the same services as a settlement house. Clisby served briefly as the organization's first president before resigning for health reasons, and was vice president from 1882 to 1889.

== Later years ==
After retiring from medicine she moved to Geneva, where she founded L'Union des Femmes. She remained active for many years, giving lectures on medical and spiritual subjects into her nineties. She died in London in 1931 at the age of 100. In 1930, she was described as the oldest woman doctor in the world.

Clisby is remembered in connection with the WEIU on the Boston Women's Heritage Trail.

Clisby Close, in the Australian Capital Territory suburb of Cook, is named in her honour.
