= William Dexter =

William Dexter (1818–1860) was an English-Australian painter.

A book about William and Caroline, Folie A Deux: William and Caroline Dexter in Colonial Australia, was written by Patrick Morgan in 1999.
