= Girls' Latin School of Baltimore =

Defunct college preparatory school in Maryland, US

Girls' Latin School of Baltimore was a college preparatory school in Baltimore, Maryland, in existence from 1890 to 1951. The school was founded in 1890 as an extension of Goucher College, at the time located on the campus. It separated from Goucher in 1909, and relocated in 1914 and again 1927.
