= H. M. Peebles =

English entomologist (1872–1944)

Howard Maxwell Peebles (7 March 1872 – 15 November 1944) was an English entomologist who specialised in butterflies.

The Peebles family owned the A. M. Peebles & Sons Rishton paper mill. He was educated at Harrow School and was in the 1890 Harrow School Cricket XI. Peebles wrote Peebles, H.M. and Schmassmann, W. Description of the female of Troides allotei Rothschild. Novitates Zoologicae 24:26-27 (1917) and Bryk, F. & Peebles, H.M. 1932. New Papilionidae (Lep.) Miteilungen der Deutschen Entomologischen Gesellschaft 3: 10.(1932). He purchased parts of the James John Joicey collection in the 1930s. The Parnassius are now in the Ulster Museum (purchased from Harrow school which holds the rest of his collection).

Peebles was a Fellow of the Royal Entomological Society of London.

Felix Bryk named the butterfly Parnassius acdestis peeblesi (Bryk, 1932) for him.
