= Travis Hafner =

American baseball player (born 1977)

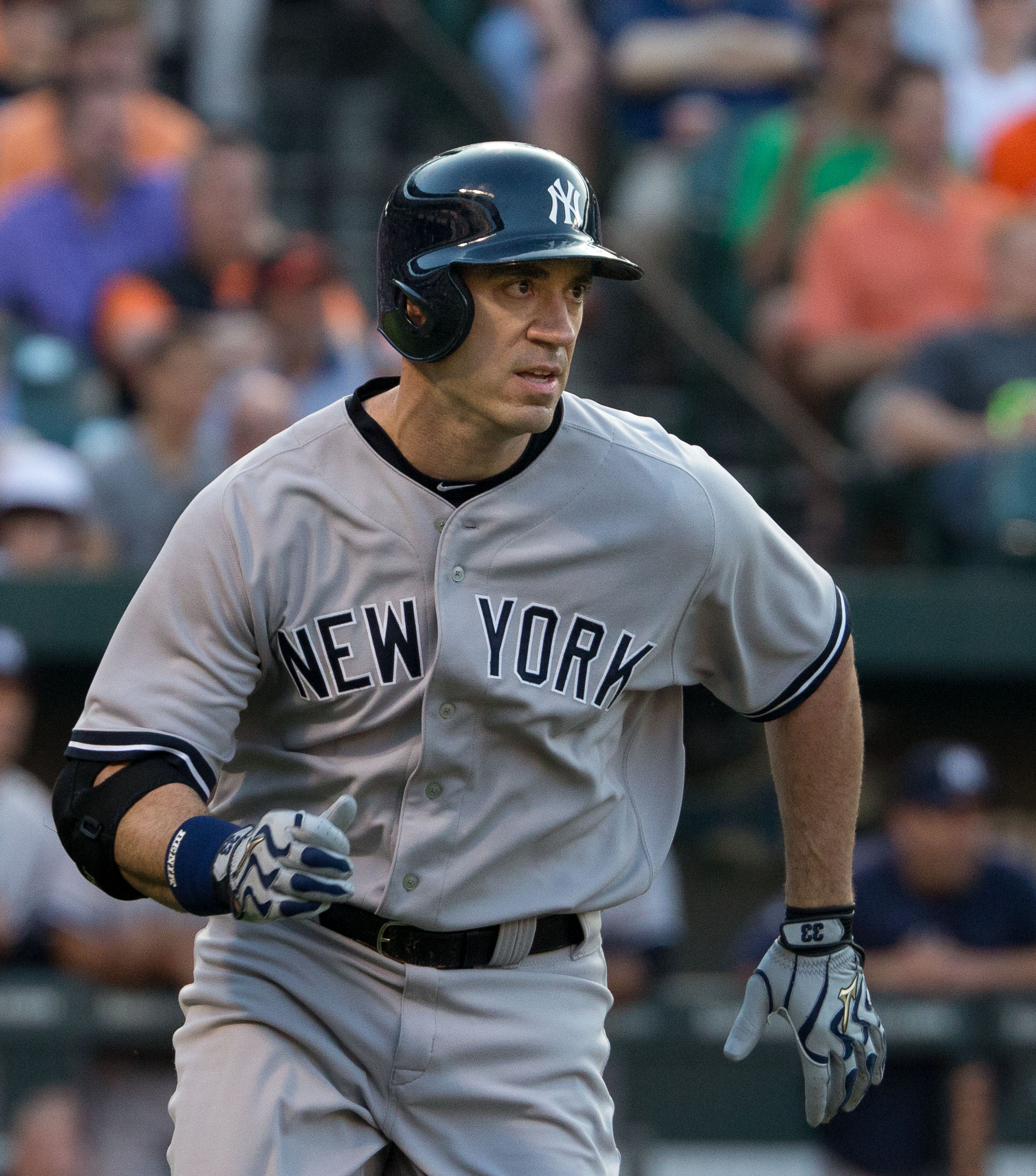
- Hafner with the New York Yankees in 2013
- Designated hitter / First baseman
- Born: June 3, 1977 (age 49); Jamestown, North Dakota, U.S.
- Batted: Left Threw: Right

MLB debut
- August 6, 2002, for the Texas Rangers

Last MLB appearance
- September 29, 2013, for the New York Yankees

MLB statistics
- Batting average: .273
- Home runs: 213
- Runs batted in: 731
- Stats at Baseball Reference

Teams
- Texas Rangers (2002); Cleveland Indians (2003–2012); New York Yankees (2013)

Travis Lee Hafner (/ˈhæfnər/; born June 3, 1977) is an American former professional baseball player. He played in Major League Baseball as a designated hitter and first baseman. A left-handed hitter, Hafner played for the Texas Rangers, Cleveland Indians and New York Yankees. His nickname, "Pronk", was given to him by former teammate Bill Selby during spring training of 2003 when people sometimes referred to him as "the Project" and other times "Donkey" for the way he looked when running the bases. He has the most home runs for a player born in North Dakota, and shares the MLB record for grand slams in one season, with six.

== Early life and career ==
Hafner was born in Jamestown, North Dakota, in 1977 and attended a small high school in Sykeston, which did not have a baseball program. He was valedictorian of his high school class of eight students. Hafner attended Cowley County Community College in Arkansas City, Kansas. He played for the college baseball team and hit a home run in the championship game of the JUCO World Series.

== Professional career ==
=== Texas Rangers ===
Hafner was drafted by the Texas Rangers in the 31st round (923rd overall) of the 1996 Major League Baseball draft. After playing in the Rangers' minor league system for six years, he earned his first call-up to the majors on August 6, 2002. Hafner made his major league debut that day against the Detroit Tigers, pinch hitting for Michael Young in the ninth inning and striking out. Five days later, he hit his first career home run on August 11 against the Cleveland Indians. In addition to the home run, Hafner had two doubles and a single in five at-bats, driving in three runs and scoring two. He nearly hit for the cycle in this game, but was thrown out at third base while attempting the triple. In 23 games with the Rangers, Hafner batted .242 with four doubles, a home run and 6 RBI.

=== Cleveland Indians ===
==== 2003–2005 ====
On December 6, 2002, the Rangers traded Hafner to the Indians along with Aaron Myette for catcher Einar Diaz and right-handed pitcher Ryan Drese. Hafner enjoyed moderate success with the Indians in 2003, splitting time between first base and designated hitter. In 91 games, he batted .254 with 14 home runs and 40 RBI. On August 14, he hit for the cycle in Minnesota, the first Indian to accomplish the feat since Andre Thornton in 1978.

In 2004, Hafner had a breakout offensive season. As the primary DH in the Indians' line-up, he finished the season in the top ten in the league in on-base plus slugging (.993, second), on-base percentage (.410, third), slugging percentage (.583, fourth), doubles (41, sixth), extra base hits (72, seventh), RBI (109, ninth) and batting average (.311, 10th). He also hit 28 home runs (16th in the AL) and scored 96 runs (20th in the AL). Hafner topped the .300 mark in batting average each month of the season except August–when he hit a respectable .274–and was particularly hot in July, hitting .361 with eight home runs and 28 RBI. He hit his first career grand slam in the Indians' home opener on April 12, against Kyle Lohse of the Minnesota Twins.

On April 13, 2005, the Indians signed Hafner to a three-year contract through 2007 with a club option for 2008. He responded by exceeding his offensive production of 2004. Hafner was again among the league leaders in on-base plus slugging (second, 1.003), on-base percentage (third, .408), slugging percentage (third, .595), doubles (fifth, 42), walks (seventh, 79), extra base hits (eighth, 75), batting average (ninth, .305), home runs (ninth, 33) and RBI (ninth, 108), also scoring 94 runs. The American League named Hafner Player of the Month for June, during which he posted a .345 batting average with 10 doubles, eight home runs, and 29 RBI in 24 games.

In the first full week of July, Hafner was named Player of the Week after hitting .480 with four home runs and 12 RBI in eight games. On July 16, Hafner was hit in the face by a pitch thrown by the Chicago White Sox's Mark Buehrle and was placed on the 15-day disabled list on July 26. After returning from the DL on August 4, he hit .296 with 15 home runs and 45 RBI over the remaining 54 games of the season. To end the season, Hafner hit home runs in six straight games from September 18–24, the second longest such streak in Cleveland history.

After the season, the Cleveland chapter of the Baseball Writers' Association of America (BBWAA) named him Indians Man of the Year and he finished fifth in the AL Most Valuable Player voting.

==== 2006 ====
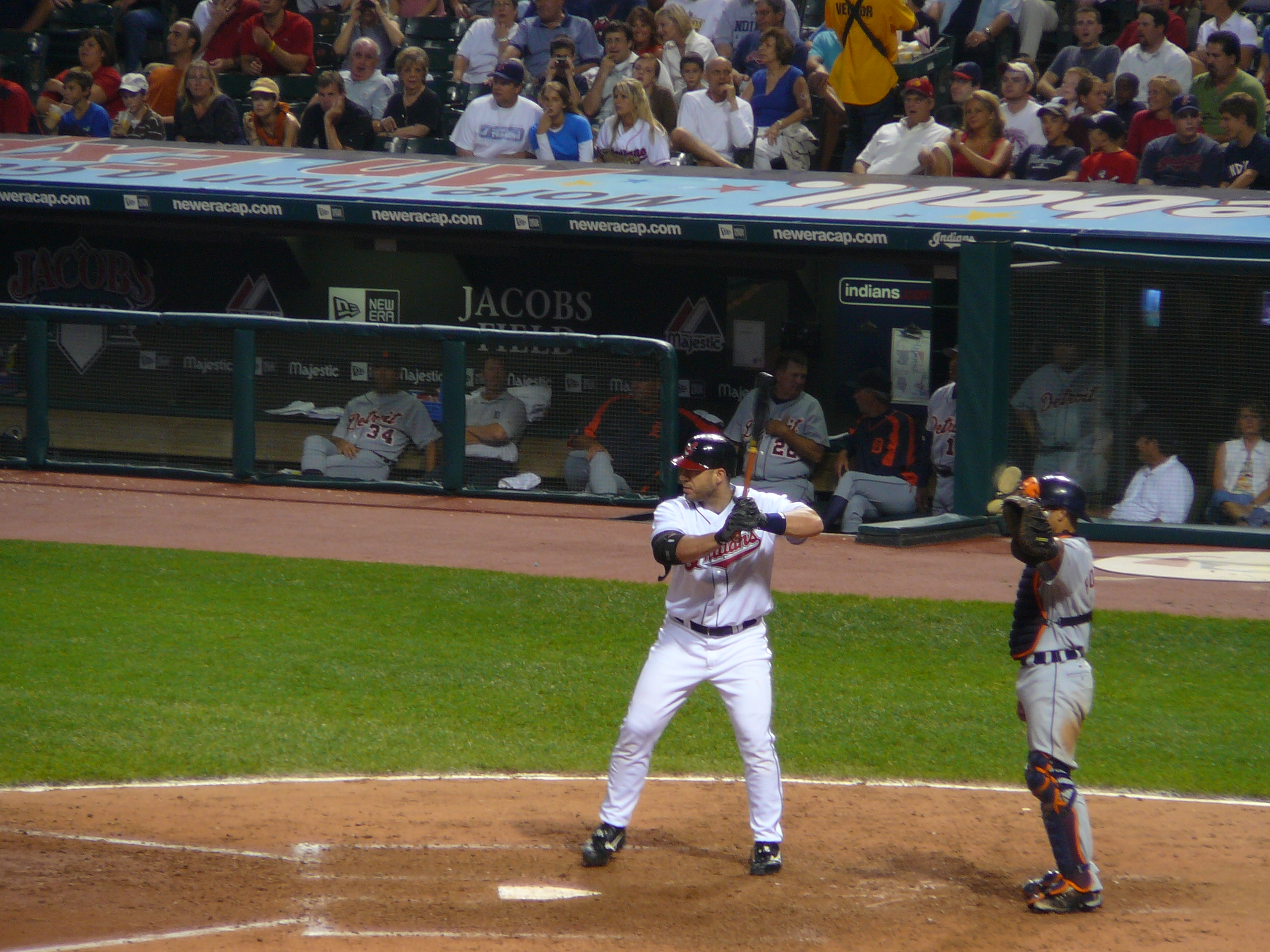
Hafner is intentionally walked by the Detroit Tigers on August 25, 2006

For the third straight season, in 2006, Hafner posted MVP-caliber numbers while anchoring the middle of one of the most potent offenses in baseball. On September 1, he was hit on the hand by Texas Rangers pitcher C.J. Wilson. The Indians placed him on the disabled list for the rest of the season on September 9 after x-rays revealed a broken bone in his right hand. At the time of the injury, he led the league in slugging percentage (.659) and walks (100); was second in home runs (42), RBI (117), total bases (299), on-base percentage (.439) and extra-base hits (74); and was third in runs scored (100). He also batted over .300 (.308) for the third consecutive season. He finished eighth in the league MVP voting by the BBWAA.

On June 7, a section in the right field mezzanine at Jacobs Field was officially opened as "Pronkville". On July 7, Hafner became the first player in Major League history to hit five grand slams before the All-Star break and passed Al Rosen in the team's season record book when he homered off Kris Benson of the Baltimore Orioles. He joined Hall-of-Famer Ernie Banks of the 1955 Chicago Cubs, Jim Gentile of the 1961 Orioles and Don Mattingly of the 1987 Yankees as the only players to hit at least five grand slams in a season.

A little more than a month later, on August 13, Hafner tied Mattingly's single-season record when he hit his sixth grand slam of the season, off Luke Hudson of the Kansas City Royals. His league-leading 13 home runs and 30 RBI, combined with his .361 average in the month of August, earned Hafner AL Player of the Month—the second time he had been honored as such in his career.

Hafner set the single-season club mark with 39 home runs and 110 RBI as a DH, surpassing Andre Thornton's 1982 totals of 32 home runs and 109 RBI. He became the second Indian ever to record 40 home runs, 100 walks, 100 runs and 100 RBI in the same season (Jim Thome did so in 1997, 2001 and 2002). His .659 slugging percentage was the sixth-highest in team history.

==== 2007–2012 ====
In 2007, Hafner batted .266 for the season, compared to .308 in 2006 and .305 in 2005. He hit 24 home runs and 100 runs batted in, his fourth straight season of 100+ RBI. Some critics pointed to Hafner's disappointing performance being due to unfinished contract negotiations, but Hafner denied this. The Indians signed Hafner to a four-year, $57 million contract extension during the All-Star break, keeping him in Cleveland through the 2012 season.

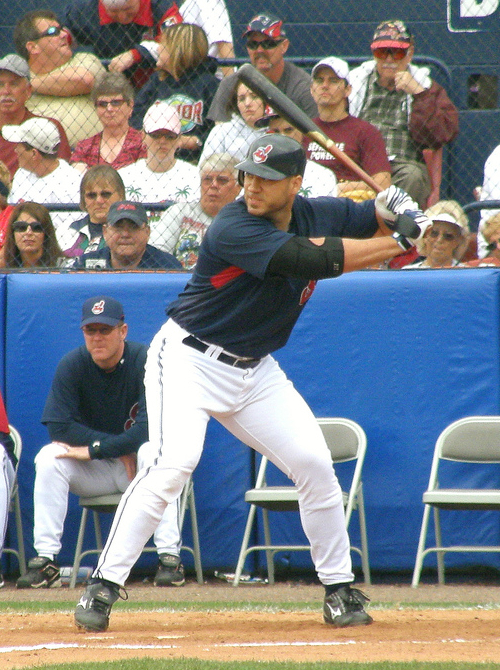
Hafner batting for the Cleveland Indians in 2008 spring training

Hafner missed most of the 2008 season due to injuries, appearing in only 57 games with 234 appearances at the plate. When he did play, Hafner's performance was the worst of his career, finishing his abbreviated season with a .197 batting average, five home runs, 24 RBI and a .628 OPS.

Though he still missed time due to injury in 2009, Hafner appeared in 94 games and hit .272 with 16 home runs, 49 RBI and a .826 OPS.

Hafner played 118 games with 462 plate appearances in 2010, hitting .278 with 13 home runs, 50 RBI and an .824 OPS.

In 2011, Hafner batted .280 with 13 home runs and 57 RBI in 94 games. On May 13, 2011, Hafner hit a walk-off home run off Seattle Mariners' closer Brandon League. Hafner hit another walk-off home run on July 7, 2011, a grand slam off Toronto Blue Jays reliever Luis Pérez, the 25th ultimate grand slam in major league history, and 12th and final grand slam of his career.

On April 5, 2012, Hafner became only the 11th player in Cleveland Indians history to make at least 10 starts on Opening Day in an Indians uniform. On April 15, 2012, Hafner hit a home run off Kansas City Royals starting pitcher Luis Mendoza that was estimated at having traveled 456 feet. It was the longest homer hit at Kauffman Stadium since 2001. When Hafner was placed on the injured list in May for surgery to repair an injured right knee, it was his sixth appearance on the list in the last five seasons. Against the Detroit Tigers on August 5, Hafner a solo home run in the 10th inning, his 200th home run of his career. He was again placed on the disabled list in August, with lower back inflammation. On October 31, the Indians declined Hafner's option, making him a free agent.

=== New York Yankees ===
On February 1, 2013, Hafner signed a one-year, $2 million contract with the New York Yankees. In his first game at Progressive Field since joining the Yankees, Hafner was 2-for-3 with two walks, 4 RBI and three runs, including a three-run home run in his first at-bat. Despite batting .318 in April, Hafner faltered later in the season and suffered rotator cuff inflammation. Limited to only 82 games, Hafner batted .202 with 12 home runs and 37 RBI.

== Post-career ==
On January 15, 2014, Hafner was hired as a volunteer assistant coach for the Notre Dame College baseball team.

Hafner was eligible to be elected into the Hall of Fame in 2019, but received less than 5% of the vote and became ineligible for the 2020 ballot.

As of 2023, Hafner ranked first all-time for career home runs by a player born in North Dakota with 213.

== Personal life ==
In November 2006, Hafner married Amy Hafner (née Beekman). The couple have three sons, Blake Lee, born in 2009, Trip John, born in 2012, and Knox Jameson born in 2015.

Hafner is a fan of World Wrestling Entertainment (WWE), especially the wrestler Stone Cold Steve Austin.

In April 2006, Malley's Chocolates of Cleveland unveiled the 'Pronk Bar', a milk chocolate candy bar named in honor of Hafner. Hafner's new product, "Pronk Beef Jerky" hit shelves in mid-2007.

== See also ==
- List of Major League Baseball players to hit for the cycle
- List of Major League Baseball ultimate grand slams

Awards and achievements
Preceded by Alex Rodriguez; David Ortiz	American League Player of the Month; June 2005; August 2006	Succeeded by Jason Giambi; Robinson Canó
Preceded by Don Mattingly	Single season Grand Slam record holders 2006–present	Succeeded by Incumbent
Preceded by Eric Byrnes	Hitting for the cycle August 14, 2003	Succeeded by Vladimir Guerrero
