= Edgewater, Cleveland =

Neighborhood of Cleveland, Ohio, United States

Edgewater
- Neighborhood of Cleveland
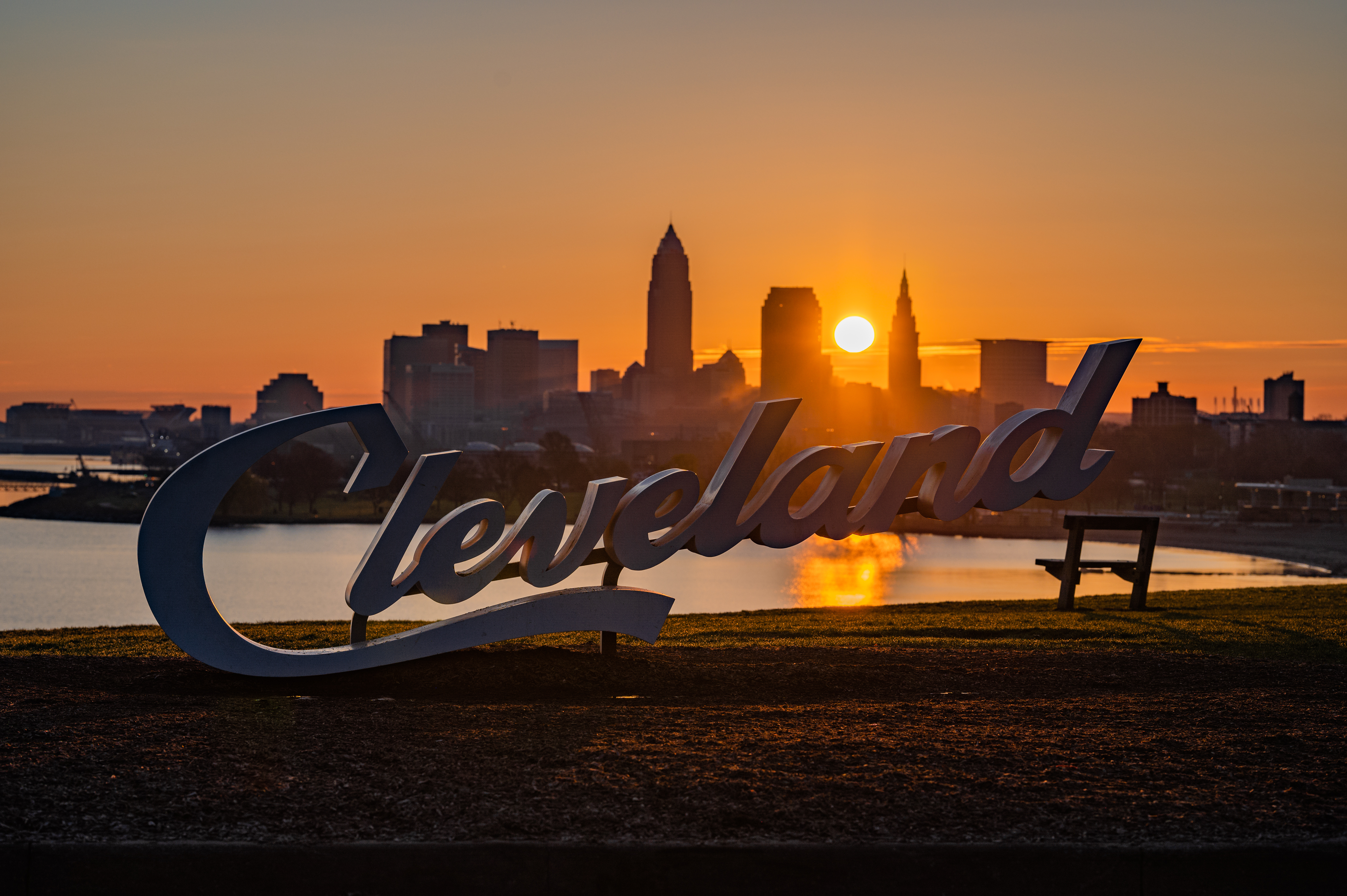
- The Cleveland sign at Edgewater Park at sunrise

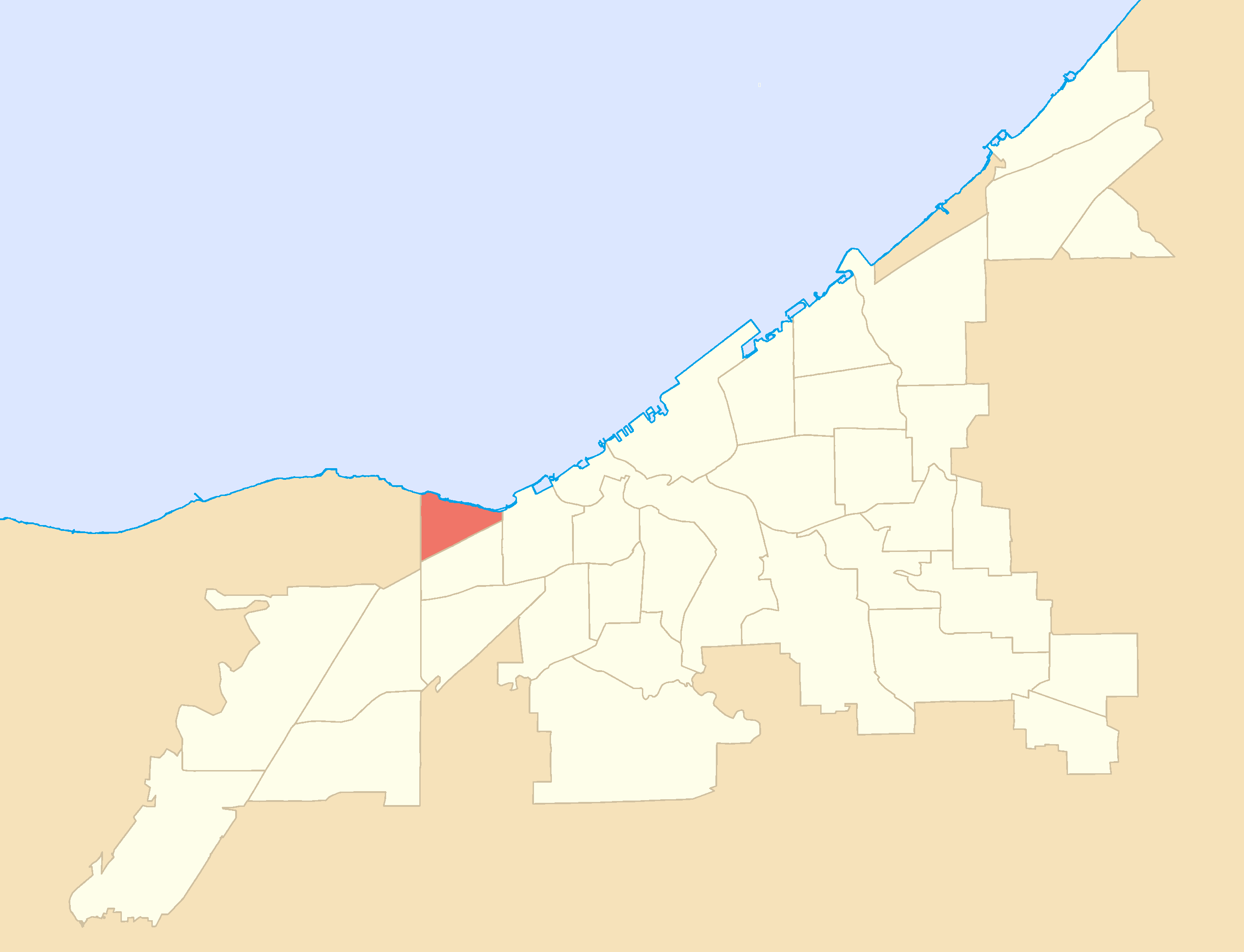
- Coordinates: 41°29′05″N 81°45′08″W
- Country: United States
- State: Ohio
- County: Cuyahoga
- City: Cleveland

Population (2020)
  - Total: 6,630

Demographics
  - White: 67.8%
  - Black: 14.6%
  - Hispanic (of any race): 13.4%
  - Asian and Pacific Islander: 2.5%
  - Mixed and Other: 15.1%
- Time zone: UTC-5 (EST)
  - Summer (DST): UTC-4 (EDT)
- ZIP Codes: 44102
- Area code: 216
- Median income: $44,928
- Source: 2020 U.S. Census, City Planning Commission of Cleveland

Edgewater is a neighborhood on the West Side of Cleveland, Ohio. Located along the Lake Erie shoreline, it is situated approximately five miles west of downtown Cleveland. It extends east-to-west from the neighborhood of Detroit–Shoreway to the streetcar suburb of Lakewood and north-to-south from Lake Erie to the neighborhood of Cudell.

Edgewater is known for its Lake Erie frontage, tree-lined streets, and extensive Edgewater Park, part of the Lakefront Reservation of the Cleveland Metroparks. It also includes the Clifton Boulevard Historic District retail area. The neighborhood was part of the Village of West Cleveland from 1871 until its annexation to Cleveland in 1894. Some light industry is located along the rail line on its southern border, separating it from Cudell.

Edgewater is represented in Cleveland City Council by Councilwoman Jenny Spencer as part of the city's Ward 15, together with Detroit–Shoreway and Whiskey Island.

== Transportation ==
Edgewater has two main RTA public transit lines that run through the neighborhood. The Cleveland State Line is a BRT line that travels along Clifton Boulevard, which opened in 2014. The West 117th–Madison station is a train station on the RTA Red Line.
