= Lakewood, Ohio =

- City
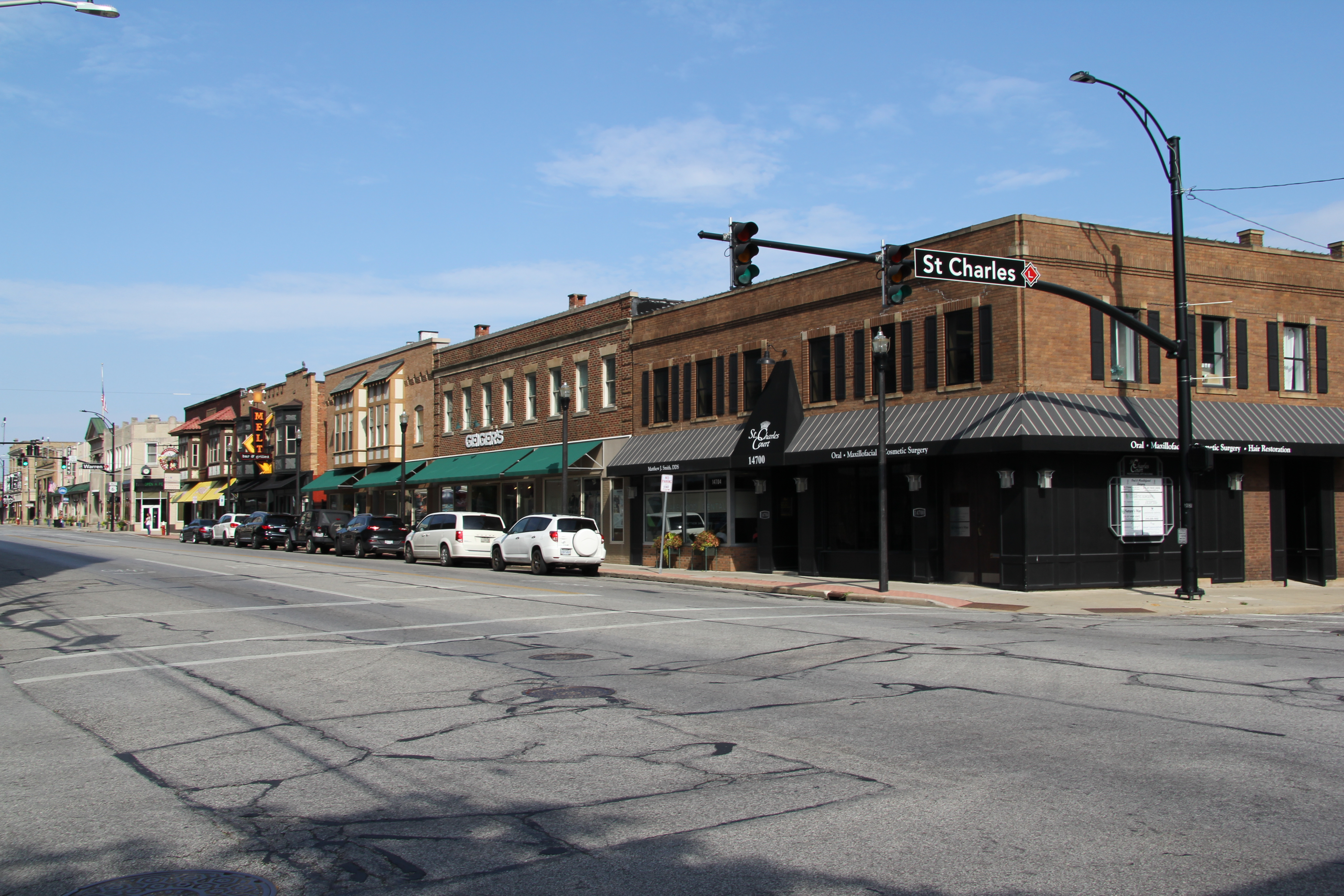
- Lakewood Downtown Historic District

- Nickname: City of Homes
- Motto: "A Great Place to Call Home"
- Interactive map of Lakewood, Ohio
- Location within Ohio Location within the United States
- Coordinates: 41°28′55″N 81°47′54″W
- Country: United States
- State: Ohio
- County: Cuyahoga

Government
  - Type: Mayor-council
  - Mayor: Meghan George (D)

Area
  - Total: 6.70 sq mi (17.34 km^{2})
  - Land: 5.54 sq mi (14.36 km^{2})
  - Water: 1.15 sq mi (2.98 km^{2})
- Elevation: 702 ft (214 m)

Population (2020)
  - Total: 50,942
  - Density: 9,191.1/sq mi (3,548.69/km^{2})
- Time zone: UTC−5 (Eastern (EST))
  - Summer (DST): UTC−4 (EDT)
- ZIP code: 44107
- Area code: 216
- FIPS code: 39-41664
- GNIS feature ID: 1064966
- Website: lakewoodoh.gov

Lakewood is a city in Cuyahoga County, Ohio, United States, on the southern shore of Lake Erie. Established in 1889, it is one of Cleveland's historical streetcar suburbs and part of the Cleveland metropolitan area. The population was 50,942 at the 2020 census, making it the third largest city in Cuyahoga County, behind Cleveland and Parma.

== History ==
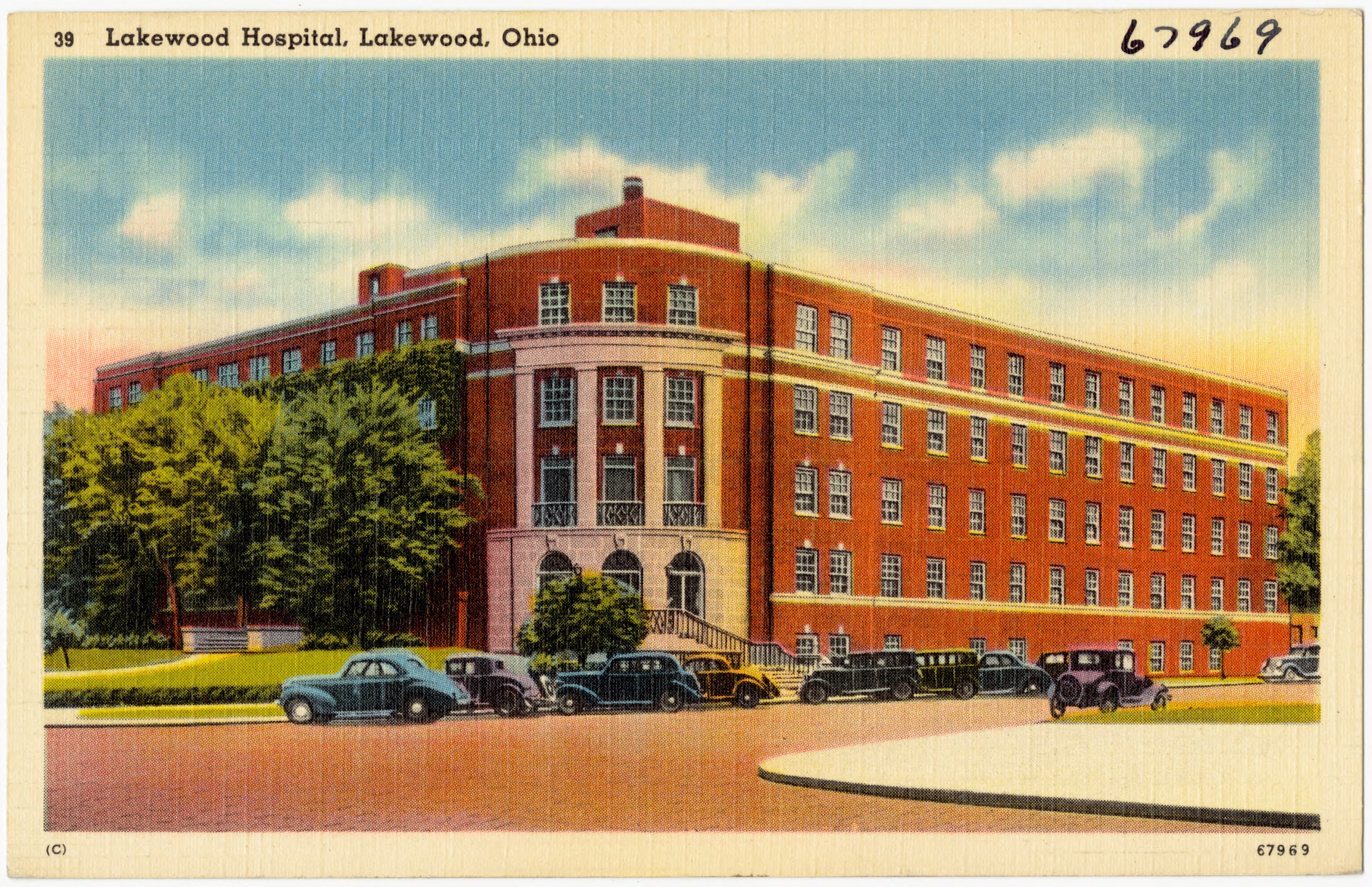
The former Lakewood Hospital as depicted c. 1930s

=== Establishment ===
The area now called Lakewood was populated by the Ottawa, Potawatomi, Chippewa, Wyandot, Munsee, Delaware and Shawnee tribes until the Treaty of Ft. Industry pushed them west in 1805. Prior to the treaty, American settlers were prohibited from moving west of the Cuyahoga River. The treaty ceded 500,000 acres of some of the tribes' land to the United States for about $18,000 or 3.5 cents/acre. The Shawnee and Seneca, living with the Wyandot, were to get $1000 "...every year forever hereafter."

In 1806, the area was formally surveyed as Rockport Township, Township 7, Range 14, of the Connecticut Western Reserve. It was purchased from the Connecticut Land Company by a syndicate of six men headed by Judson Canfield on April 4, 1807, for $26,084. In 1818, permanent settlement began with the arrival from Connecticut of James Nicholson. Other early pioneers included Jared Kirtland and Mars Wagar. Settlements were mostly along Detroit Avenue, a toll road operated by the Rockport Plank Company from 1848 to 1901, with large farms and properties extending north to Lake Erie. Making bricks and planting orchards were among the most prolific occupations until natural gas and crude oil wells were developed in the early 1880s. By 1819, 18 families lived in Rockport Township. Early settlers sustained their lives through farming. The land was ideal for fruit farming and many vineyards began to emerge. Current street names reflect this history such as Orchard Grove and Blossom Park. The most common occupations in Lakewood were farming and the building trades.

=== Incorporation and growth ===
A toll road was established from Cleveland to Lakewood by the Rockport Plank Road Company, operating from 1848 to 1901. Lakewood was incorporated as a village in 1889, and named for its lakefront location. In 1893, streetcars came from Cleveland to Lakewood with the construction of the Detroit Avenue line, followed by the Clifton Boulevard line in 1903 and the Madison Avenue line in 1916.

Under the Ohio Common School Act of April 9, 1867, three schools were allotted to East Rockport, called 6, 8, and 10; they were later designated East, Middle, and West. Each school had one teacher. As the community began to grow and more schools were required, the school board adopted the policy of honoring Ohio's presidents by assigning their names to the school buildings. The Rocky River Railroad was organized in 1869 by speculators as an excursion line to bring Clevelanders to the resort area they developed at the mouth of the Rocky River. Financially unsuccessful as a pleasure and amusement venture, the line was sold to the Nickel Plate Railroad in 1881. The railroad line still exists today, running in an east–west direction north of Detroit Avenue.

Notably, Lakewood was home to two pioneering automobile manufacturers: Winton Motor Carriage Company (est. 1897) and Baker Motor Vehicle (1899). By 1906, the latter became the largest electric vehicle maker in the world at the time.

=== Modern redevelopment ===
Rockport Square was developed on the eastern end of the city in 2004 and incorporated residential townhouses all along Detroit Avenue.

Lakewood was accepted into the nationally renowned Ohio Main Street Program in 2005. In 2009, the American Institute of Architects and the Cleveland Restoration Society honored the City of Lakewood Department of Planning & Development and LakewoodAlive with an award for Creative & Effective Preservation Advocacy.

Lakewood operates a CERT program. This all-citizen emergency response program was created in 2005.

== Geography ==
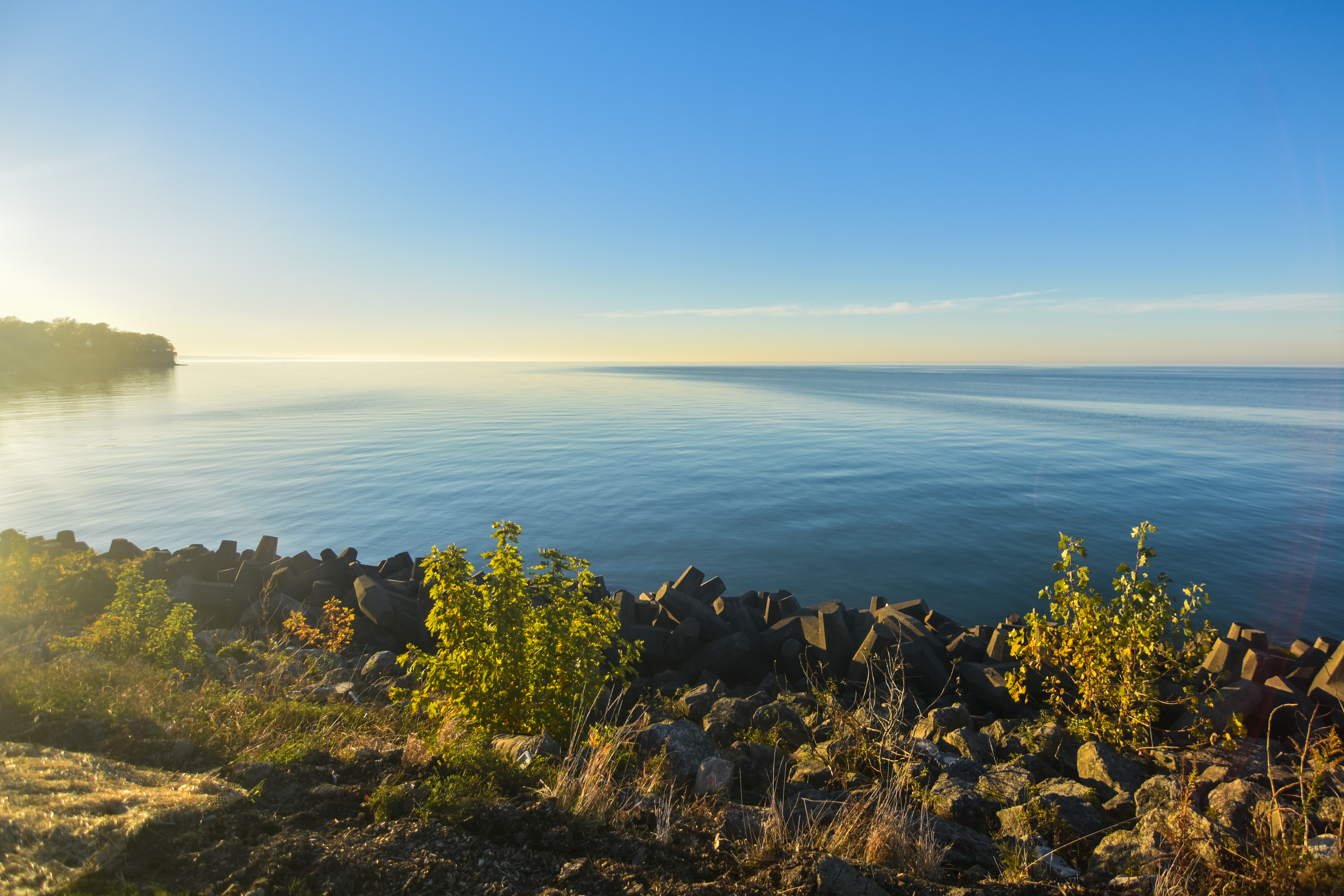
Lake Erie shore at Lakewood Park

Lakewood is located about 6 miles (9.7 km) west of Downtown Cleveland. The city borders Lake Erie to the north, the Cleveland neighborhoods of Edgewater and Cudell to the east, and the neighborhoods of Jefferson and Kamm's Corners to the south. It borders the suburb of Rocky River to the west at the Rocky River valley. According to the United States Census Bureau, the city has a total area of 6.69 square miles (17.33 km^{2}), of which 5.53 square miles (14.32 km^{2}) is land and 1.16 square miles (3.00 km^{2}) is water.

=== Neighborhoods ===
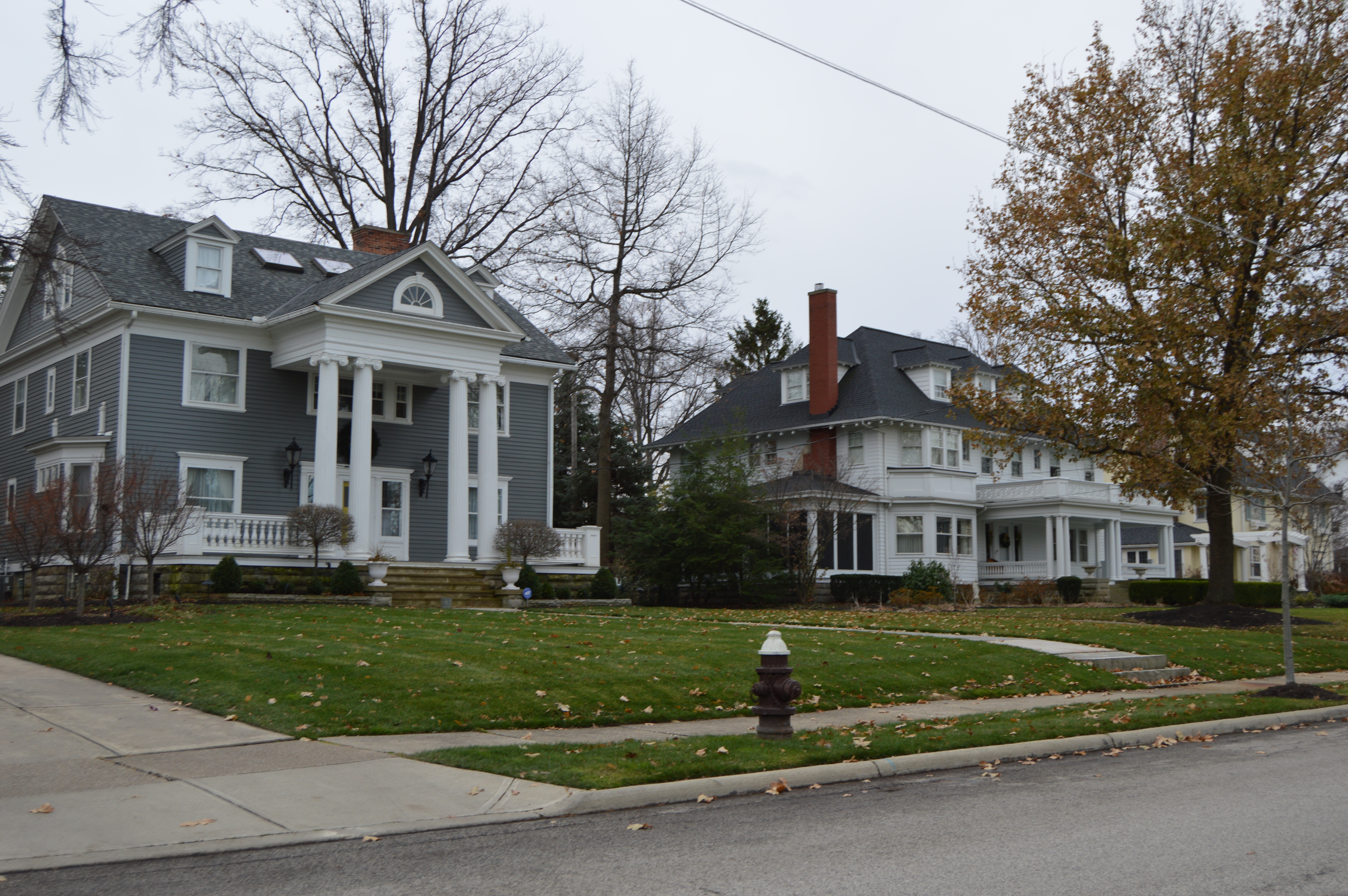
Houses on Lake Road in the Clifton Park Lakefront District

Historical housing throughout the city and an active historical society are the norm in Lakewood. The "Make Lakewood Beautiful" program involves contests in which residents compete to make their homes look and resemble their original design and architecture, and awards are given to several homeowners each year. The city offers tours of the most famous homes in the spring, summer, and fall.

- Arts District - Centered around the Beck Center for the Arts, on the west side of Lakewood.
- Birdtown - Southeastern corner of Lakewood, a well-known 8-street residential district on the southeast side of the city that was built specifically for the workers of the nearby National Carbon Company in the 1890s. The houses are distinctive and most of the streets are named after birds. Birdtown was designated a National Register Historic District in 2006. It is adjacent to Madison Park, the former Union Carbide factory, and the W. 117th St. Rapid Transit Station. Many of the original houses built there were boarding houses. Birdtown achieved National Historic Register status in 2006.
- Clifton Boulevard - Lined with big trees and multi-family homes, apartment complexes, and 4×4 brick structures, and turn of the century single family colonials, the seven-lane Clifton Boulevard is one of the busiest streets in greater Cleveland.
- Clifton Park - The wealthiest neighborhood of Lakewood is situated in the northwestern corner of the city, and consists mostly of magnificent Victorian mansions. It is bounded by Sloane on the south, Webb Road on the east, the Rocky River on the west, and Lake Erie on the north. Built in the late 19th century, this area has been historically, and continues to be, home to many of greater Cleveland's most prominent citizens. Includes the private Clifton Beach community.
- Downtown Lakewood - The main section of Lakewood is centered at Detroit Avenue and Warren Road. Downtown Lakewood spans from Bunts Avenue to the east and Arthur Avenue to the west along Detroit. This district was formally identified when Lakewood was chosen as a member of the national MainStreet program in 2005. The area is lined with office buildings, restaurants, and variety shops. Lakewood Library, the USPS, and the site of the former Lakewood Hospital are all located in this district.
- The Edge - This easternmost neighborhood includes many concert venues, pubs, and taverns.
- Victorian Village - This was named after the large Victorian homes on Grace, Clarence and Cohassett Avenues on the city's east end. When constructed in the early 1900s, it served as residences for executives from the National Carbon Company.
- The Gold Coast - Collection of high rises on the northeast end of Lakewood, bordering Lake Erie.
- Rockport Square - Rockport Square (not to be confused with the former Rockport Township) is an urban renewal project along Detroit Avenue on the eastern side of the city. Construction began in 2004 of roughly 200 condos, lofts, and live-work spaces.
- West End - The West End is the westernmost neighborhood of Lakewood, along the Rocky River Reservation. In 2002, the administration of Mayor Madelaine Cain proposed to seize homes in this area using eminent domain, to replace them with retail development. After a citizen-led resistance attracted national media attention from 60 Minutes, the West End proposal failed in a 2003 referendum.

== Demographics ==
Historical population
Census	Pop.	Note	%±
1900	3,355		—
1910	15,181		352.5%
1920	41,732		174.9%
1930	70,509		69.0%
1940	69,160		−1.9%
1950	68,071		−1.6%
1960	66,154		−2.8%
1970	70,173		6.1%
1980	61,963		−11.7%
1990	59,718		−3.6%
2000	56,646		−5.1%
2010	52,131		−8.0%
2020	50,942		−2.3%

=== Racial and ethnic composition ===
Lakewood city, Ohio – Racial and ethnic composition Note: the US Census treats Hispanic/Latino as an ethnic category. This table excludes Latinos from the racial categories and assigns them to a separate category. Hispanics/Latinos may be of any race.
Race / Ethnicity (NH = Non-Hispanic)	Pop 2000	Pop 2010	Pop 2020	% 2000	% 2010	% 2020
White alone (NH)	51,921	44,341	42,164	91.66%	85.06%	82.77%
Black or African American alone (NH)	1,088	3,238	2,674	1.92%	6.21%	5.25%
Native American or Alaska Native alone (NH)	119	127	57	0.21%	0.24%	0.11%
Asian alone (NH)	796	977	1,219	1.41%	1.87%	2.39%
Native Hawaiian or Pacific Islander alone (NH)	13	9	16	0.02%	0.02%	0.03%
Other race alone (NH)	61	123	192	0.11%	0.24%	0.38%
Mixed race or Multiracial (NH)	1,379	1,169	2,136	2.43%	2.24%	4.19%
Hispanic or Latino (any race)	1,269	2,147	2,484	2.24%	4.12%	4.88%
Total	56,646	52,131	50,942	100.00%	100.00%	100.00%

=== 2020 census ===
As of the 2020 census, Lakewood had a population of 50,942. The median age was 35.2 years. 15.3% of residents were under the age of 18 and 14.2% of residents were 65 years of age or older. For every 100 females there were 96.6 males, and for every 100 females age 18 and over there were 95.9 males age 18 and over.

Non-Hispanic White residents made up 82.8% of the population, followed by 5.3% non-Hispanic Black residents, 2.4% Asian residents, 0.2% American Indian or Alaska Native residents, 0.0% Native Hawaiian or Other Pacific Islander residents, 1.3% some other race, 6.3% two or more races, and 4.9% Hispanic or Latino residents of any race as of the 2020 census.

100.0% of residents lived in urban areas, while 0.0% lived in rural areas.

There were 26,441 households in Lakewood, of which 17.0% had children under the age of 18 living in them. Of all households, 28.4% were married-couple households, 28.3% were households with a male householder and no spouse or partner present, and 33.7% were households with a female householder and no spouse or partner present. About 47.1% of all households were made up of individuals and 11.8% had someone living alone who was 65 years of age or older.

There were 28,802 housing units, of which 8.2% were vacant. The homeowner vacancy rate was 1.6% and the rental vacancy rate was 6.5%.

Racial composition as of the 2020 census
Race	Number	Percent
White	42,936	84.3%
Black or African American	2,777	5.5%
American Indian and Alaska Native	88	0.2%
Asian	1,224	2.4%
Native Hawaiian and Other Pacific Islander	19	0.0%
Some other race	674	1.3%
Two or more races	3,224	6.3%
Hispanic or Latino (of any race)	2,484	4.9%

=== 2010 census ===
As of the census of 2010, there were 52,131 people, 25,274 households, and 11,207 families residing in the city. The population density was 9,426.9 inhabitants per square mile (3,639.7/km^{2}). There were 28,498 housing units at an average density of 5,153.3 per square mile (1,989.7/km^{2}). The racial makeup of the city was 87.5% White, 6.4% African American, 0.3% Native American, 1.9% Asian, 1.3% from other races, and 2.7% from two or more races. Hispanic or Latino of any race were 4.1% of the population.

There were 25,274 households, of which 22.5% had children under the age of 18 living with them, 29.7% were married couples living together, 10.8% had a female householder with no husband present, 3.8% had a male householder with no wife present, and 55.7% were non-families. 44.8% of all households were made up of individuals, and 9.8% had someone living alone who was 65 years of age or older. The average household size was 2.05 and the average family size was 2.99.

The median age in the city was 35.4 years. 19.6% of residents were under the age of 18; 9.6% were between the ages of 18 and 24; 34.3% were from 25 to 44; 25.7% were from 45 to 64; and 11% were 65 years of age or older. The gender makeup of the city was 49.1% male and 50.9% female.

As of the 2007 American Community Survey, the median income for a household in the city was $42,602, and the median income for a family was $59,201. Males had a median income of $42,599 versus $35,497 for females. The per capita income for the city was $26,939. About 10.9% of families and 14.3% of the population were below the poverty line, including 20.3% of those under age 18 and 10.5% of those age 65 or over. Of the city's population over the age of 25, 39.0% hold a bachelor's degree or higher.

=== Ethnicity and immigration ===
Lakewood's ethnic mosaic includes Albanian, Arab, Chinese, German, Hungarian, Irish, Italian, Mexican, Nepalese, Puerto Rican, Polish, Russian, Slovak, and Ukrainian ancestries. As of 2019, 12.2% spoke a language other than English at home, including Arabic, Spanish, Albanian, Russian, Serbo-Croatian, and Hungarian. The community is a hotspot for immigrants, arriving primarily from Southeast Europe (especially Albania, Romania, Greece, and the former Yugoslavia), the Middle East (Lebanon, Syria, and Iran), South Asia (India, Nepal, and Myanmar), and the former USSR (Russia, Uzbekistan, and Ukraine). The foreign-born population was approximately 8.6% in 2019.

== Economy ==
Lakewood Hospital first opened its doors in 1907. The city of Lakewood purchased the hospital in 1931. The Cleveland Clinic added the hospital to its health system in 2006. In January 2015, the Cleveland Clinic announced it would close the hospital in 2016 and replace it with a family medical center. The new medical center which included outpatient programs, an emergency department and wellness services opened across the street from the old hospital site in 2018. None of the 845 employees of Lakewood lost their jobs, as they were offered other positions in the Cleveland Clinic system. There was opposition to the closing from a citizens' group called "Save Lakewood Hospital" who contended that the city could find another entity to manage the hospital and keep it open.

Cleveland Clinic completed construction of a new one-story facility on Detroit Avenue in 2005, adjacent to Rockport Square. Cleveland Clinic began demolition in 2016 of a professional office building and garage in preparation for the construction of a new $34 million, 62,000 square foot family health building, which will serve as a replacement, in part, for Lakewood Hospital. The hospital's emergency department remains open through the construction, which is scheduled to be completed in 2018.

== Arts and culture ==
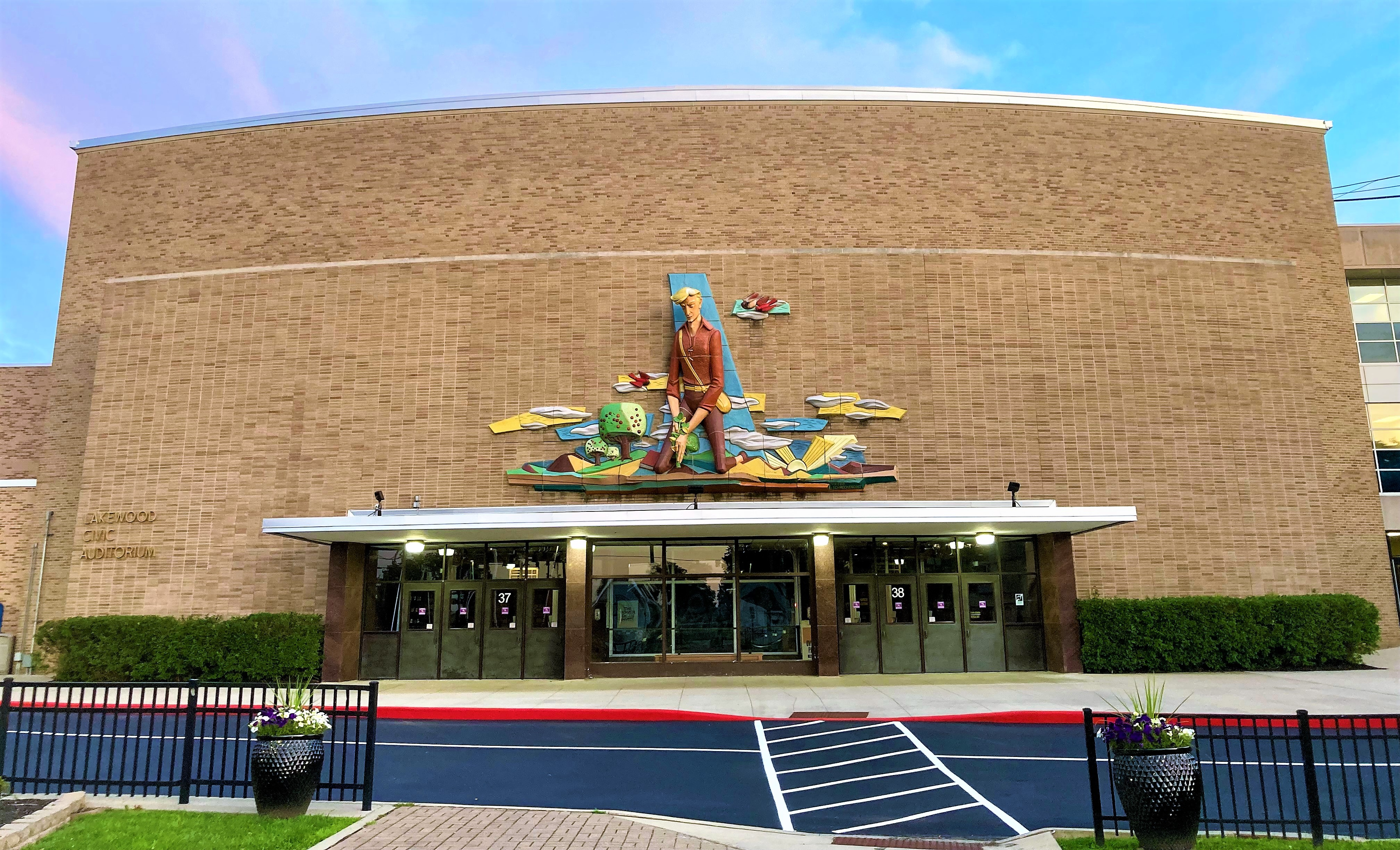
Lakewood Civic Auditorium

Lakewood Public Library has won numerous awards and has two branches: the main branch on Detroit Avenue and a smaller branch on Madison Avenue. The Lakewood Library's 2008 expansion increased the main library to 93,000 square feet; the collection then grew to over 474,000 items by 2015. The Lakewood Library celebrated its centennial in 2016. The Madison branch of the Library, designed by architectural firm Walter and Weeks, opened in 1929 in the southeastern part of the city. It underwent a $2.1 million renovation and expansion, and reopened to the public in March 2022.

The Lakewood Civic Auditorium, a 2,000-seat performing arts venue located on the campus of Lakewood High School, opened in 1955. The auditorium hosted the Great Lakes Shakespeare Festival from 1962 to 1981. The facade of the auditorium features the world's largest free-standing ceramic sculpture, Early Settler, created by Viktor Schreckengost. The sculpture is commonly known as "Johnny Appleseed" who was the subject of Schreckengost's design.

The Beck Center for the Arts is the largest cultural arts center on Cleveland's west shore.

Geiger's, a retailer of clothing and ski equipment and accessories, was founded in downtown Lakewood in 1932. The company, now run by the third generation of the Geiger family, moved to its present location in 1936. The home of Malley's Chocolates is in Lakewood. Aladdin's Eatery, a national restaurant brand, is also based in Lakewood. Their first restaurant was founded in Lakewood by Fady and Sally Chamoun in 1994. Aladdin's Lakewood Headquarters was expanded in 2007.

== Parks and recreation ==
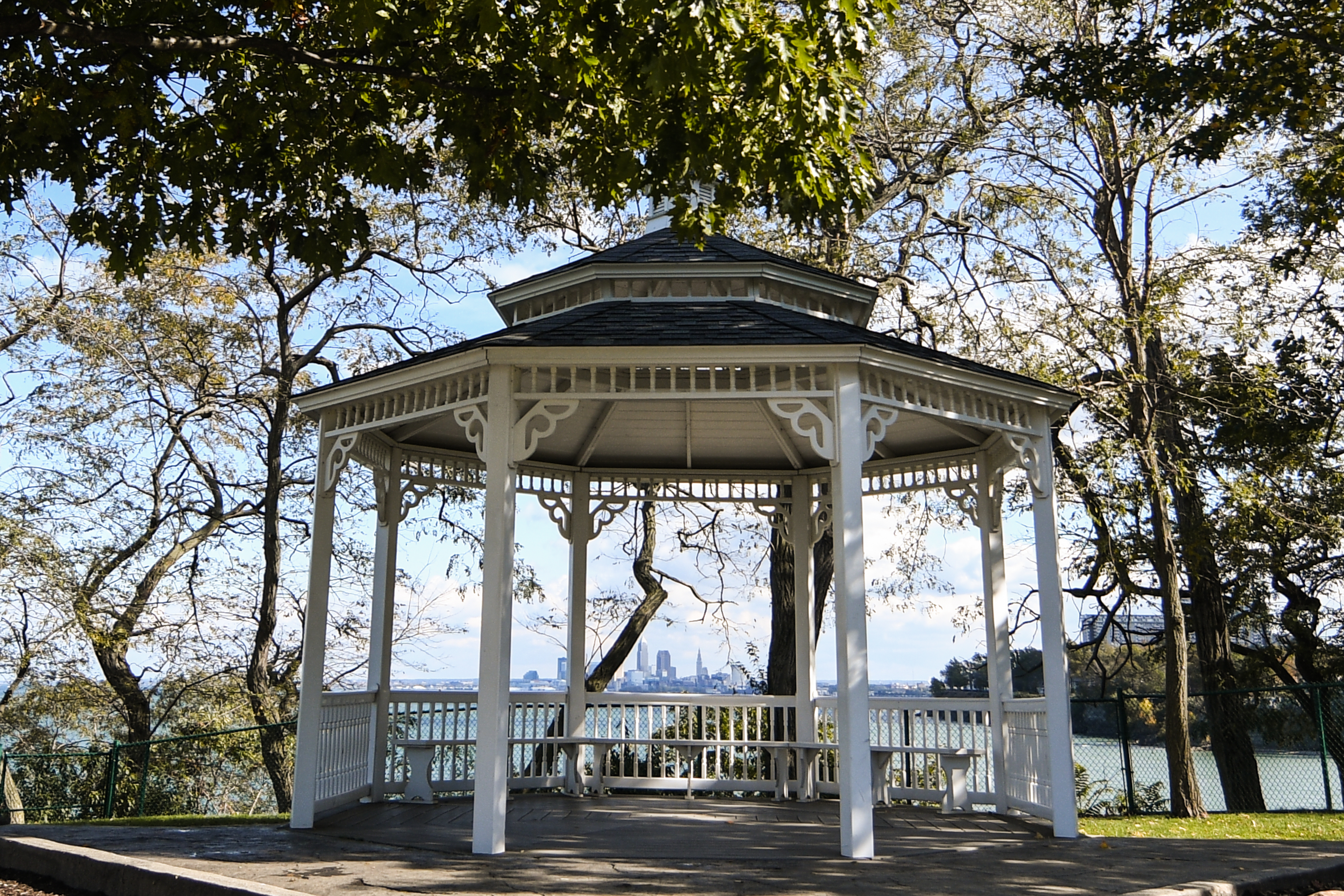
Lakewood Park gazebo

Lakewood Park is one of the largest lakefront parks in Ohio and features a live concert stage, outdoor swimming pool, picnic pavilions, 4-season public pavilion, kids' playground, baseball, volleyball, and a skate park, which opened in 2004. Lakewood has more than 150 acres (0.61 km^{2}) of greenspace citywide. The park's million dollar lakefront promenade opened in 2006 and offers an excellent panorama of Downtown Cleveland and the presence of viewing telescopes enhances the viewing experience of Downtown Cleveland. An all-purpose trail that circles the park was built in 2006.

On October 30, 2015, Lakewood opened its "Solstice Steps" in the northwest corner of the park. The steps are aligned in the direction of sunset on the summer solstice. They are constructed of white concrete blocks in five tiers; each tier has four steps separated by green grass strips.

A renovated Charles A. Foster Pool is open for the 2023 outdoor swimming season.

The Rocky River Reservation of the Cleveland Metroparks System forms part of the city's western border. The Lakewood Dog Park, built in 2004, is located next to the Metroparks, in the Rocky River valley.

== Government ==
Lakewood is governed by an elected mayor and elected council. The council has seven members, with four members representing wards in the city and the other three are at-large council members. Once politically dominated by New England Republicans, Lakewood has become a center for the progressive wing of the Democratic Party in Ohio. It was a stronghold of support for former Congressman Dennis Kucinich, and in the 2016 Democratic presidential primary, its voters strongly backed Bernie Sanders. The city is currently represented in the U.S. House of Representatives by Shontel Brown (OH-11, D). In the Ohio General Assembly it is represented by Nickie Antonio (D) in the State Senate and by Michael Skindell in the (D) State House.

Notable former mayors include Anthony Sinagra (1978 – 1990), Madeline Cain (1996 – 2003), and Ed FitzGerald (2008 – 2010).

== Education ==
=== Public schools ===
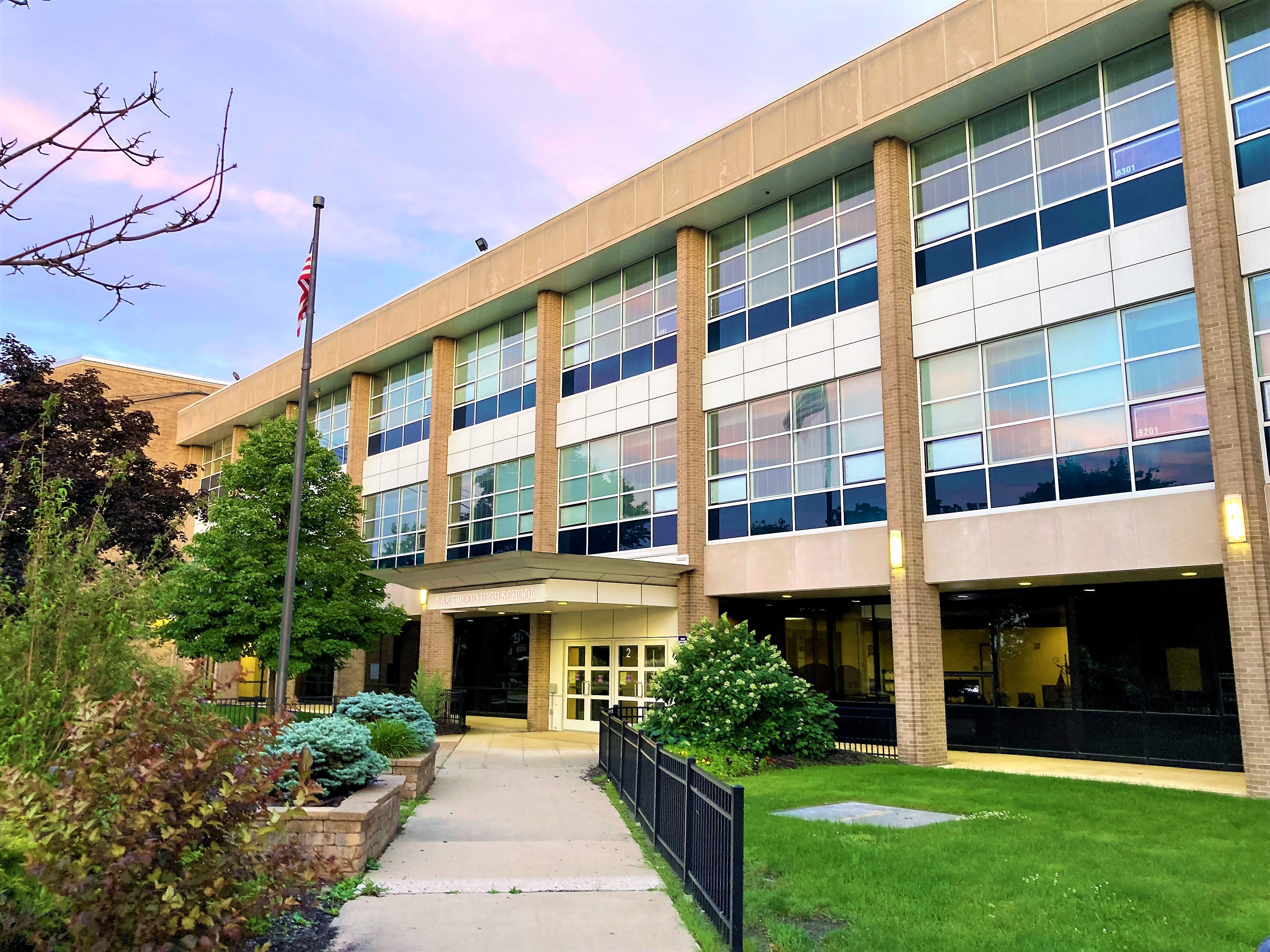
Lakewood High School

The Lakewood City School District is managed by a directly elected school board. The Lakewood City Schools was rated as having "Continuous Improvement" by the Ohio Department of Education in 2013. Lakewood rebuilt or renovated the city's high school, two middle schools and seven elementary schools in a process completed in 2017. The investment was the first major school building program in Lakewood since 1920. The school system is one of the largest employers in the city of Lakewood.

Current schools in the public system include Emerson, Grant, Harrison, Hayes, Horace Mann, Lincoln and Roosevelt elementary schools (grades PK–5); Garfield and Harding middle schools (grades 6–8) and Lakewood High School (grades 9–12).

=== Private schools ===
Lakewood Catholic Academy (grades K–8) was founded in 2005 through a consolidation of four parochial elementary schools, St. James, St. Luke and St. Clements and Transfiguration on the site of the former St. Augustine Academy. Since its founding, over $1.5 million has been invested in capital improvements, making LCA a "significant institution for parochial education in Lakewood. St. Edward High School serves boys in grades 9–12 throughout the Roman Catholic Diocese of Cleveland. Padre Pio Academy is a K–12 elementary/high school founded by lay Catholics that operates independently of the Diocese.

Lakewood Lutheran School offers a K–8 integrated elementary education.

=== Colleges ===
Post secondary education in Lakewood includes The North Coast College, focusing on graphic and fashion design.

== Media ==
A handful of print and online media chronicle Lakewood, including The Sun Post-Herald, and The Lakewood Observer.

== Transportation ==
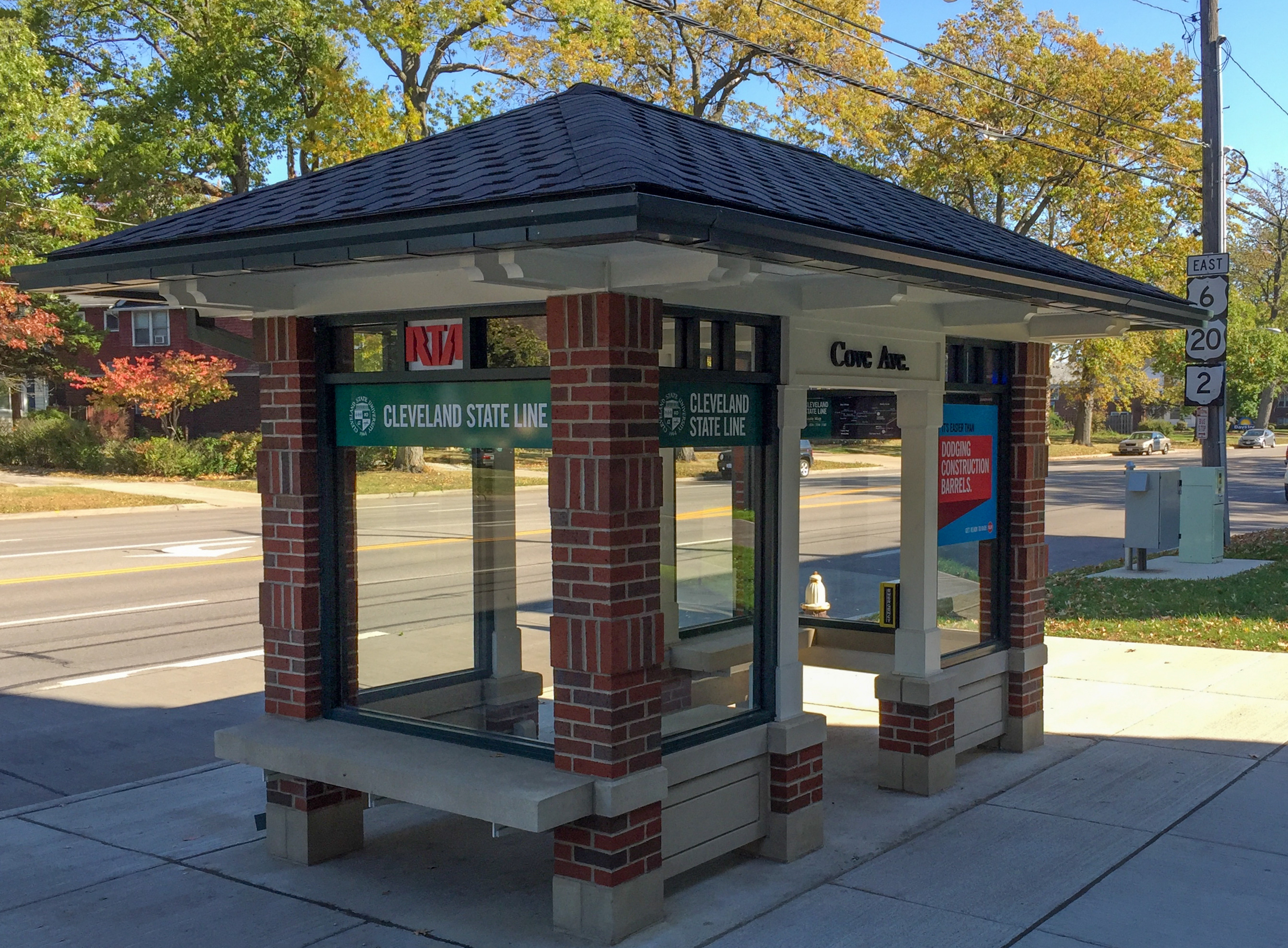
Cove Avenue & Lake Road RTA station

The Greater Cleveland Regional Transit Authority's Clifton line (routes 55,55B,55C), run east and west along Clifton Boulevard, terminating at Cleveland State University in downtown Cleveland to the east and in North Olmsted (55) or Bay Village (55B) and Westlake (55C) to the west. RTA Routes 26 and 26A serve Detroit Avenue, Route 83 serves Warren Road, Route 78 serves as the border line on West 117th Street, and Route 25 serves Madison Avenue. Two RTA rapid transit stations exist just across the Lakewood/Cleveland border, at W. 117th St. and Madison Avenue and the other between Lakewood Heights and Triskett near West 140. Both stations provide access to the Red Line east to Windermere via Downtown Cleveland and west to Cleveland Hopkins International Airport. RTA's Route 804, the Lakewood Community Circulator, was discontinued by RTA in late 2009. Lakewood residents and city officials were campaigning for it to return.

I-90 borders the south side of Lakewood and has on/off-ramps at W. 117th St., Bunts Road, Warren Road, and McKinley Road. The Cleveland Memorial Shoreway begins approximately 1-mile (1.6 km) east of Lakewood via Lake Avenue and Clifton Boulevard and serves as a transportation hub to and from downtown Cleveland.

Lakewood is bicycle-friendly, with designated "share the road" paths through the city.

== Notable people ==
=== Birthplace ===
- Richard Celeste, Governor of Ohio from 1983 to 1990, director of the Peace Corps, and 12th president of Colorado College
- Teri Garr, actress/singer/comedian
- Brian Hoyer, New England Patriots quarterback
- Josephine Irwin, suffragist and educator
- John L. Koprowski, university dean and professor
- Dave Malloy, three-time Tony Award nominee
- Seán Patrick O'Malley, Roman Catholic Cardinal and Archbishop of Boston
- Benjamin Orr, singer and bassist for The Cars
- Megan Stalter, actress and comedian

=== Former/current residents ===
- David Conte, composer
- Mike Douglas, singer and talk show host
- Jimmie Foxx, professional baseball player and manager, elected to the National Baseball Hall of Fame in 1951.
- Mike Hegan, professional baseball player and broadcaster for the Cleveland Indians
- Gary Lewis, musician
- John Lithgow, actor
- Bo Koster, Keyboardist for My Morning Jacket
- Kevin McMahon, musician
- Burgess Meredith, actor
- Darlington Nagbe, professional soccer player
- Jack Riley, actor
- Milton C. Portmann pro football player and decorated US Army officer WWI.
- Jack Buck, sportscaster, National Baseball Hall of Fame Class of 1987, Lakewood High class of 42'.
