= Malley's Chocolates =

Cleveland-based candy store

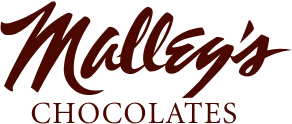
- Company type: Private
- Industry: Confectionery production
- Founded: 1935
- Founder: Albert "Mike" Martin Malley
- Headquarters: Cleveland, Ohio, United States
- Number of locations: 18 stores
- Key people: Megan Gillum (president) as of November 2025
- Products: Chocolates; Ice Cream
- Website: www.malleys.com

Malley's Chocolates is a chain of candy stores in the Cleveland, Ohio area in the U.S., founded in the suburb of Lakewood. Four of the stores include ice cream parlors year-round.

Albert "Mike" Malley borrowed $500 in 1935, and opened his first candy store on Madison Avenue in Lakewood. The Malley family lived in the back of the building. Their efforts were successful, and by 1949, they opened a second store, also in Lakewood.

In 2010, Malley's moved its corporate headquarters from Cleveland back to Lakewood, Ohio, near where the company was founded in 1935. The reason for the move was to free up more retail space at the company's main plant, where the HQ had been since 1990. Malley’s manufacturing hub is a 60,000 square-foot factory in Cleveland, noted for three tall pink silos with the words "Milk," "Sugar," and "Cocoa" painted on them. (Note: 41.4198°N 81.784°W) The company’s signature confection, chocolate-covered strawberries, are prepared by a special 50-person crew around Valentine’s Day every year. Other notable treats include chocolate-covered orange peels year round and chocolate-covered grapes during early summer.

Malley's was a vendor at the 2016 Republican National Convention in Cleveland.

In October 2017, the company opened its 23rd retail outlet in Plain Township, a suburb of Canton. This was Malley’s first venture into Stark County although it had already operated stores in adjacent Summit County.

Adele Ryan Malley, widow of the founder's son Bill, is the "voice" of Malley's.

== Unique promotions ==
Third generation Malley's former president Dan Malley is renowned for his unusual promotional events. He has persuaded Cleveland celebrities, such as Natalie Ronayne of the Cleveland Botanical Garden; Beth Mooney, CEO of KeyCorp; and celebrity chef Rocco Whelan to appear in his Malley's catalog wearing fuzzy bunny ears. It is an annual event Malley has also distributed 50,000 "CHOC" oval bumper stickers. If a driver is spotted by one of Malley's team, the driver gets $25 and a chance to win $500. Perhaps the most unusual promotion was when Malley persuaded 25 people to lease and drive pink Volkswagen beetles emblazoned with the Malley's and "CHOC" logos. Malley pays the drivers $150/month and sets up the $300/month lease through a Cleveland car dealer.
