= West 117th–Madison station =

Rapid transit station in Cleveland

W. 117–Madison
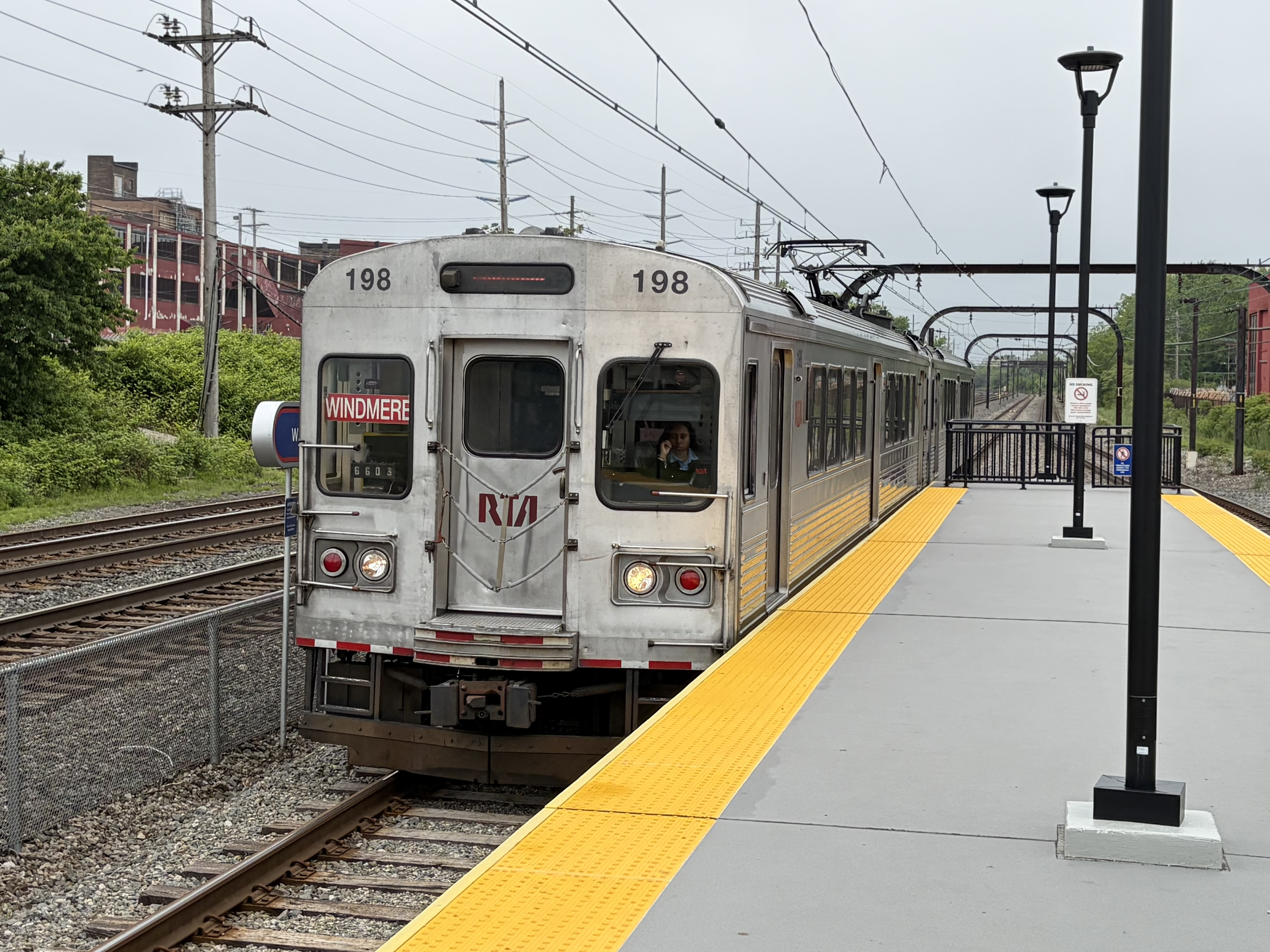
- Airport bound train arriving at the station

General information
- Location: 11631 Madison Avenue; Cleveland, Ohio
- Coordinates: 41°28′33″N 81°46′7″W
- Owner: Greater Cleveland Regional Transit Authority
- Line: NS Chicago Line
- Platforms: 1 island platform
- Tracks: 2
- Connections: RTA: 25, 78

Construction
- Structure type: Embankment
- Parking: 175 spaces
- Cycle facilities: Racks
- Accessible: Yes

Other information
- Website: riderta.com/facilities/w117

History
- Opened: August 14, 1955; 71 years ago
- Rebuilt: 2007
- Original company: Cleveland Transit System

Services
Preceding station	Rapid Transit	Following station
Triskett toward Airport	Red Line	West Boulevard–Cudell toward Windermere
Location

West 117th–Madison station is a station on the RTA Red Line in Cleveland, Ohio. It is located on the border between Cleveland and Lakewood.

The station is located on the southeast corner of Madison Avenue and West 117th Street. The border between Cleveland and Lakewood runs down West 117th Street. As originally constructed, it included a bus loop adjacent to West 117th Street and a parking lot to the east. The station has undergone renovation and reconstruction, making it accessible to people with disabilities.

== History ==
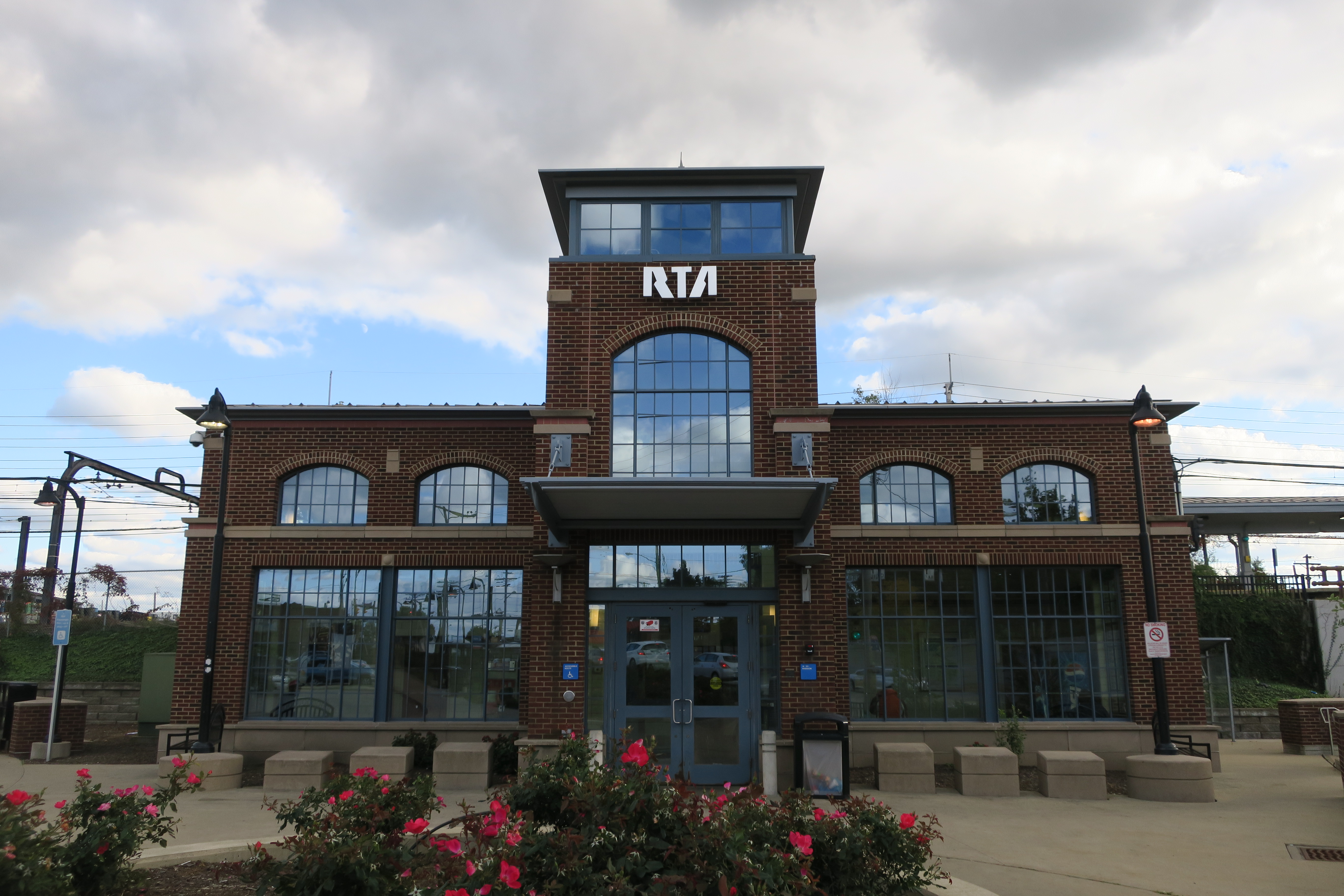
Station house

The station was the original western terminus of the CTS Rapid Transit when the west side portion of the line opened on August 14, 1955. The line was extended 1.84 miles (2.96 km) west to Triskett station on November 15, 1958.

In late 2005, RTA began rebuilding the station, which was expected to take two years. After the $4.7-million renovation, the new station was dedicated on October 16, 2007.

Upon rededication, the name of the station was to be changed to Highland Square at West 117th Street, but the West 117th–Madison name had been retained with Highland Square name attached. Highland Square refers to a neighborhood name used in the 19th century. As of 2017, the Highland name has been removed.

== Notable places nearby ==
- Lakewood
- Kirby Company
- Phantasy Theater
- Lakewood High School (Lakewood, Ohio)
- St. Edward High School
