= Triskett station =

Rapid transit station in Cleveland

Triskett
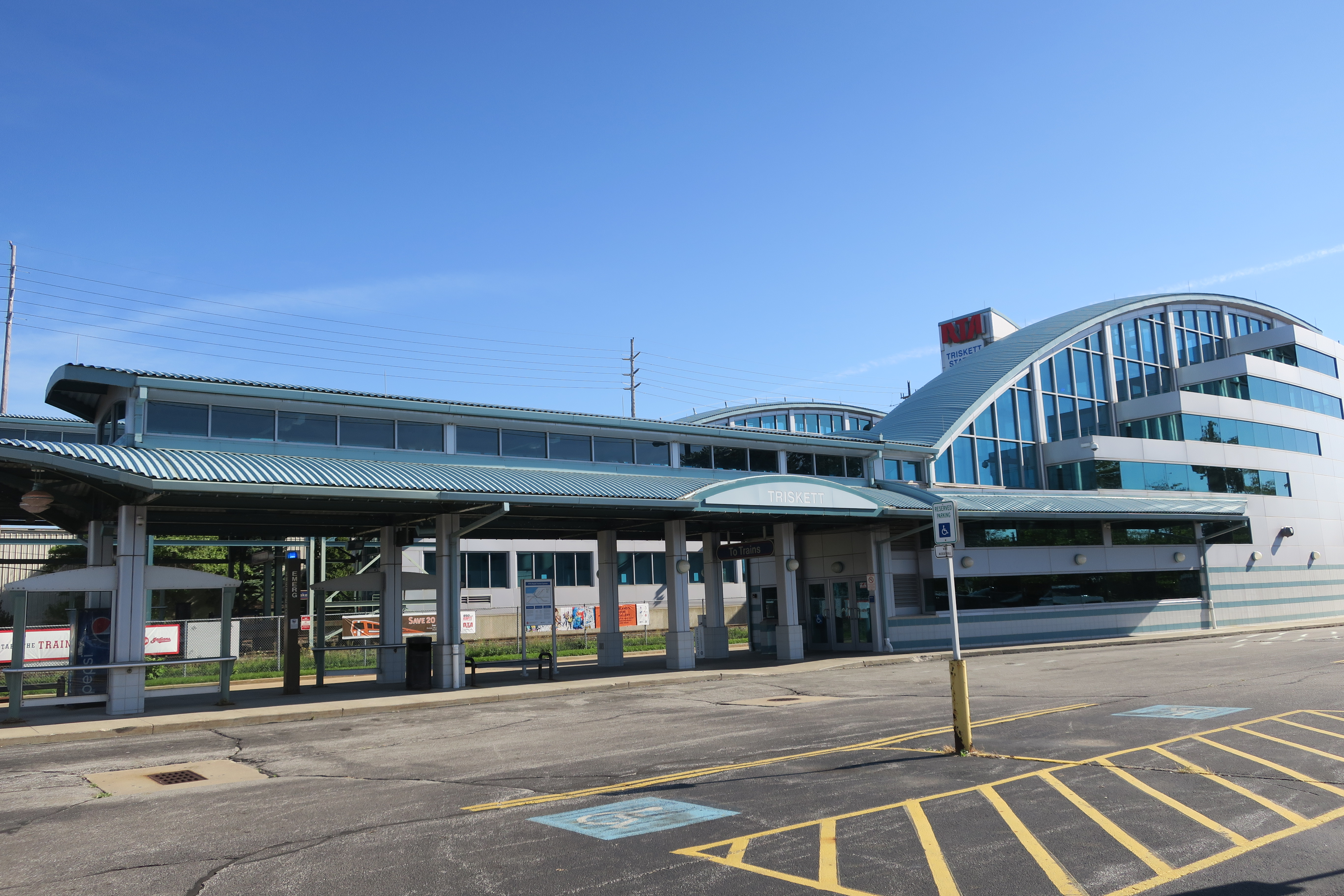
- Triskett station platform

General information
- Location: 13405 Lakewood Heights Boulevard; Cleveland, Ohio
- Coordinates: 41°27′58″N 81°47′6″W
- Owner: Greater Cleveland Regional Transit Authority
- Line: NS Chicago Line
- Platforms: 1 island platform
- Tracks: 2

Construction
- Structure type: At-grade
- Parking: 669 spaces
- Cycle facilities: Racks
- Accessible: Yes

Other information
- Website: riderta.com/facilities/triskett

History
- Opened: November 15, 1958; 67 years ago
- Rebuilt: 2000
- Original company: Cleveland Transit System

Services
Preceding station	Rapid Transit	Following station
West Park toward Airport	Red Line	West 117th–Madison toward Windermere
Location

Triskett station is a station on the RTA Red Line in Cleveland, Ohio. It is located off Triskett Road between West 139th Street and Berea Road.

The station includes a large parking lot accessible from Triskett Road. Northwest of the parking lot is the Triskett bus garage, and the station is also accessible from Lakewood Heights Boulevard by driving past the Triskett garage. Despite the fact Interstate 90 passes directly over the Triskett garage, the station is not readily accessible from the freeway. To reach the station from Interstate 90, drivers must exit at West 140th Street, drive south to Triskett Road, east on Triskett Road, and then north on the access road to the station.

The station headhouse is located on the eastern side of the parking lot adjacent to the tracks and includes a bus loading area. The headhouse is connected to the platform by a bridge extending over the westbound track.

== History ==
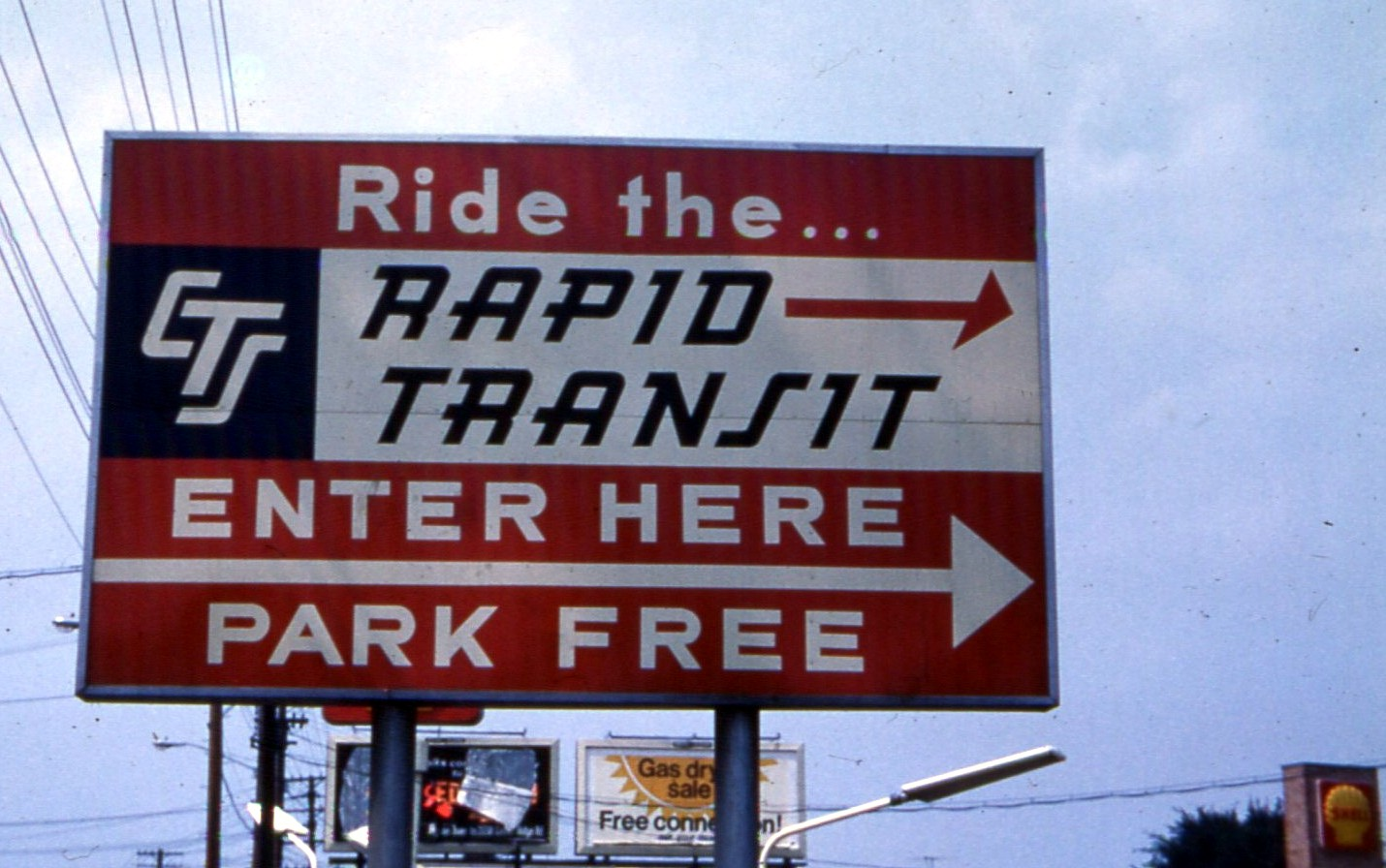
Triskett station sign in 1966

The Cleveland Transit System Rapid Transit opened in 1955, but the line was not extended to Triskett station until 1958. The station opened on November 15, 1958, and the adjacent Triskett bus garage was opened at the same time. As originally constructed the station lobby building was connected to the platform by a tunnel running under the westbound tracks.

In 1998, construction on a station renovation station began. As part of the reconstruction, a new bridge was constructed to connect the station house and the platform, replacing the tunnel. The visibility provided by the bridge enhanced station security. On November 30, 2000, a grand opening celebration was held at the new $8.4 million station.

== Notable places nearby ==
- West Park, Cleveland

== Gallery ==
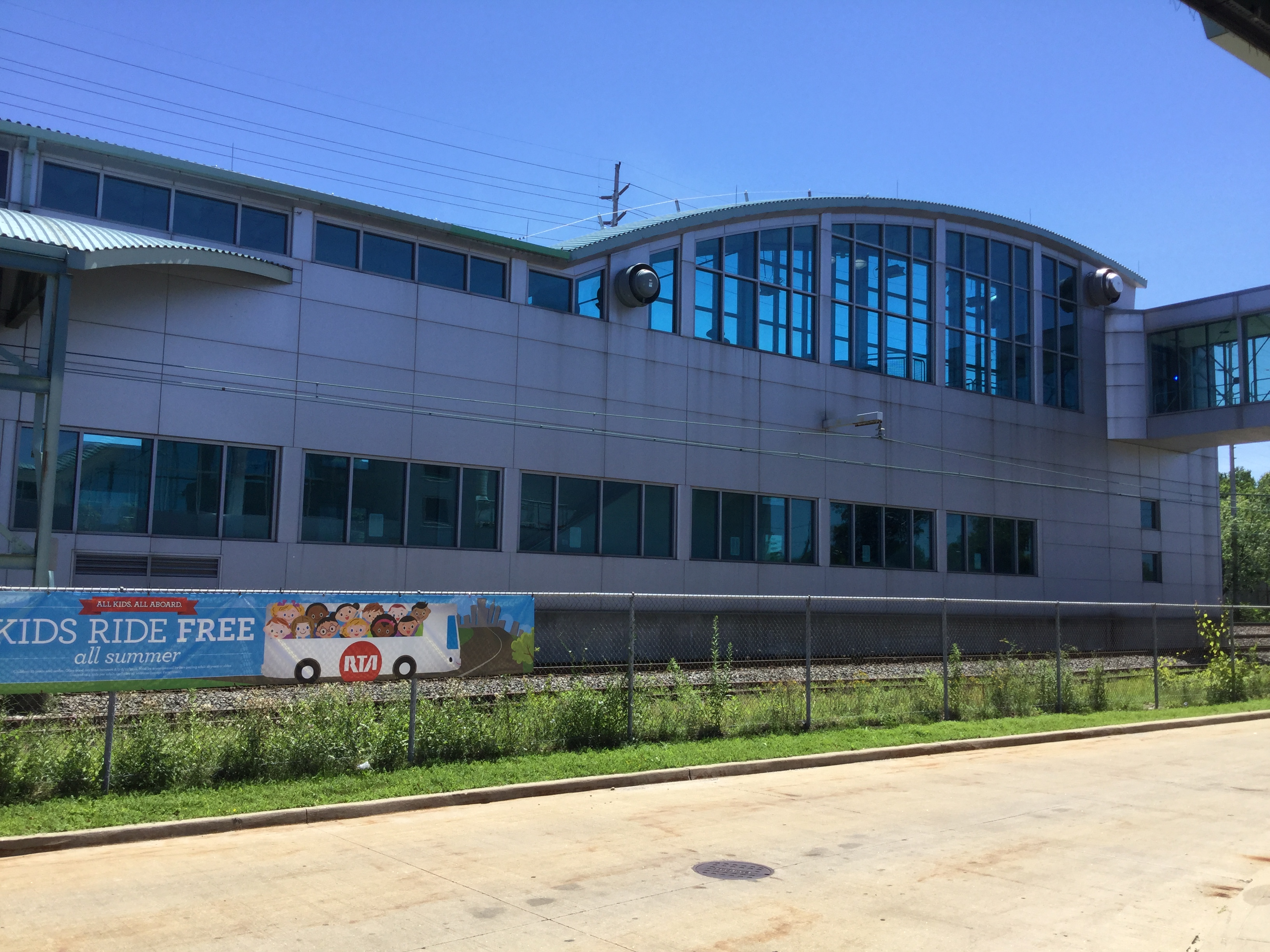

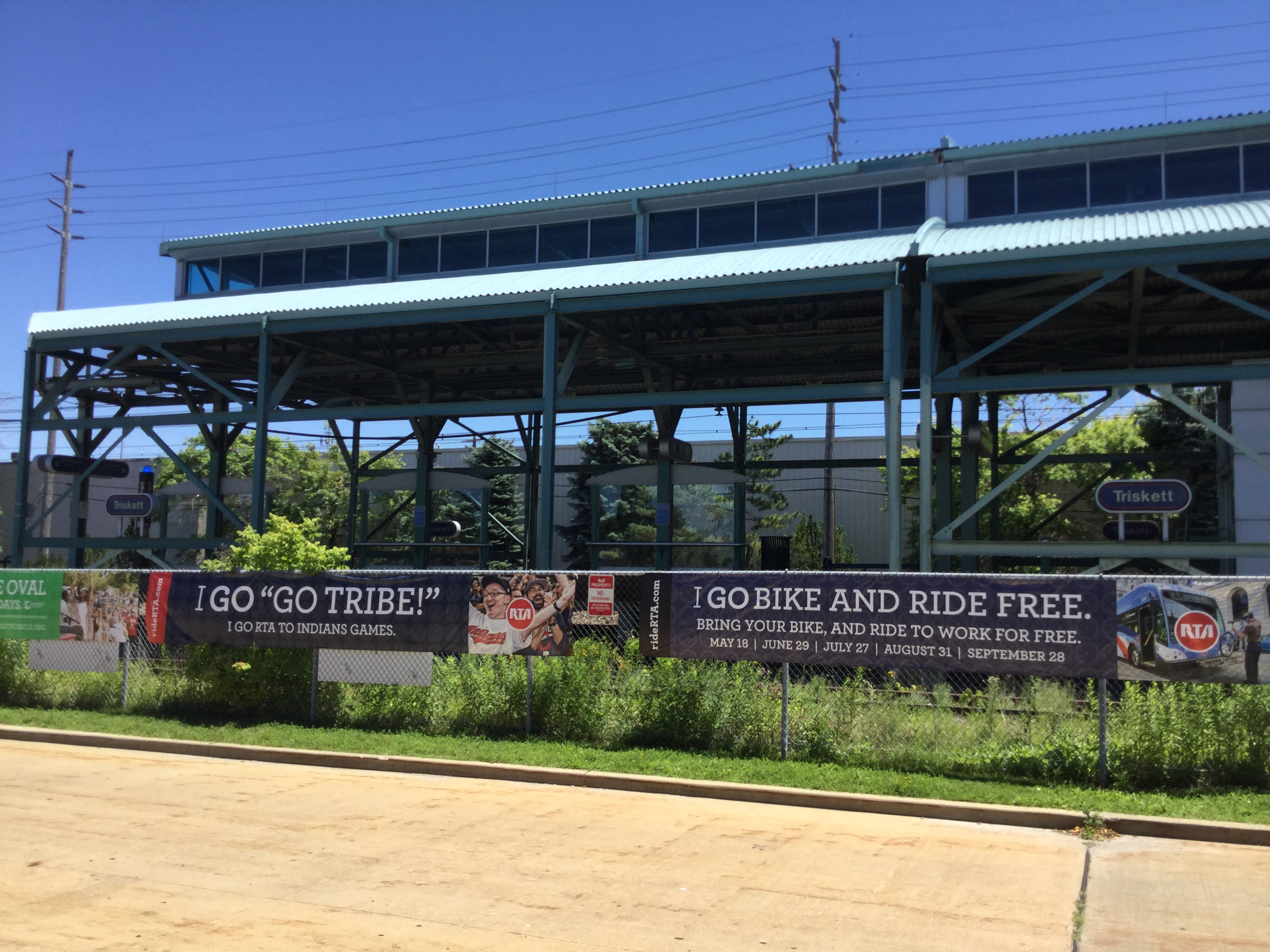

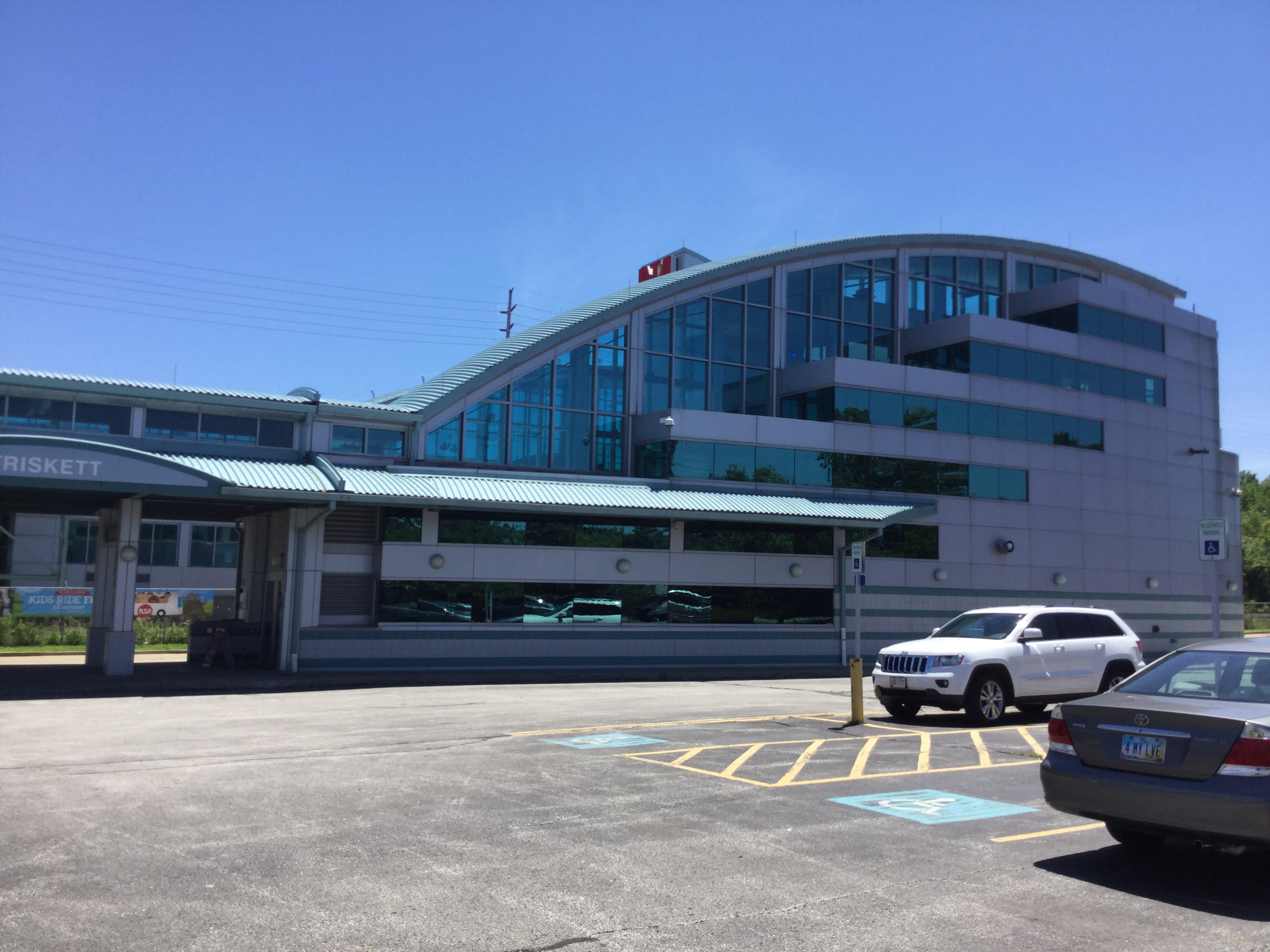

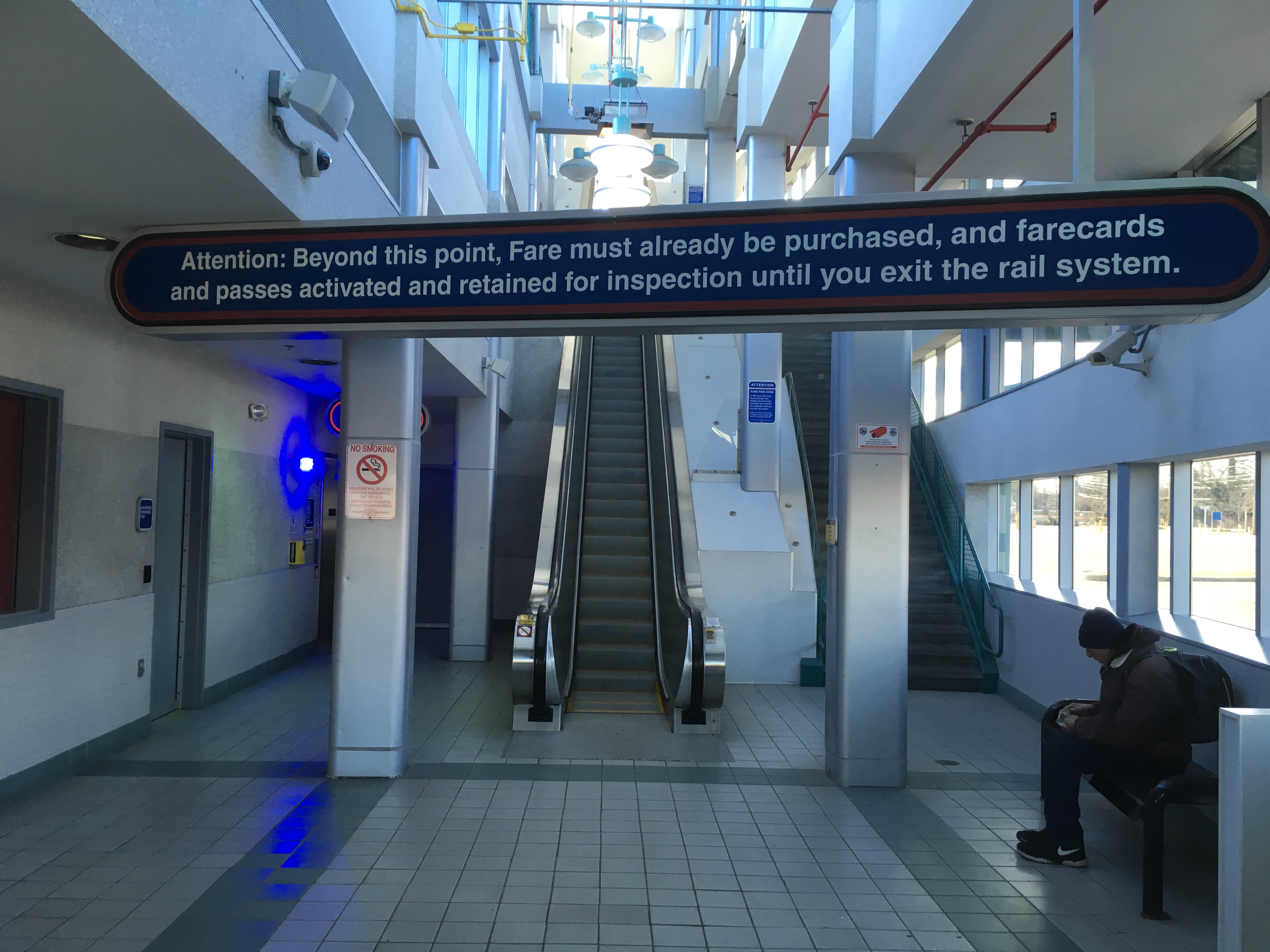

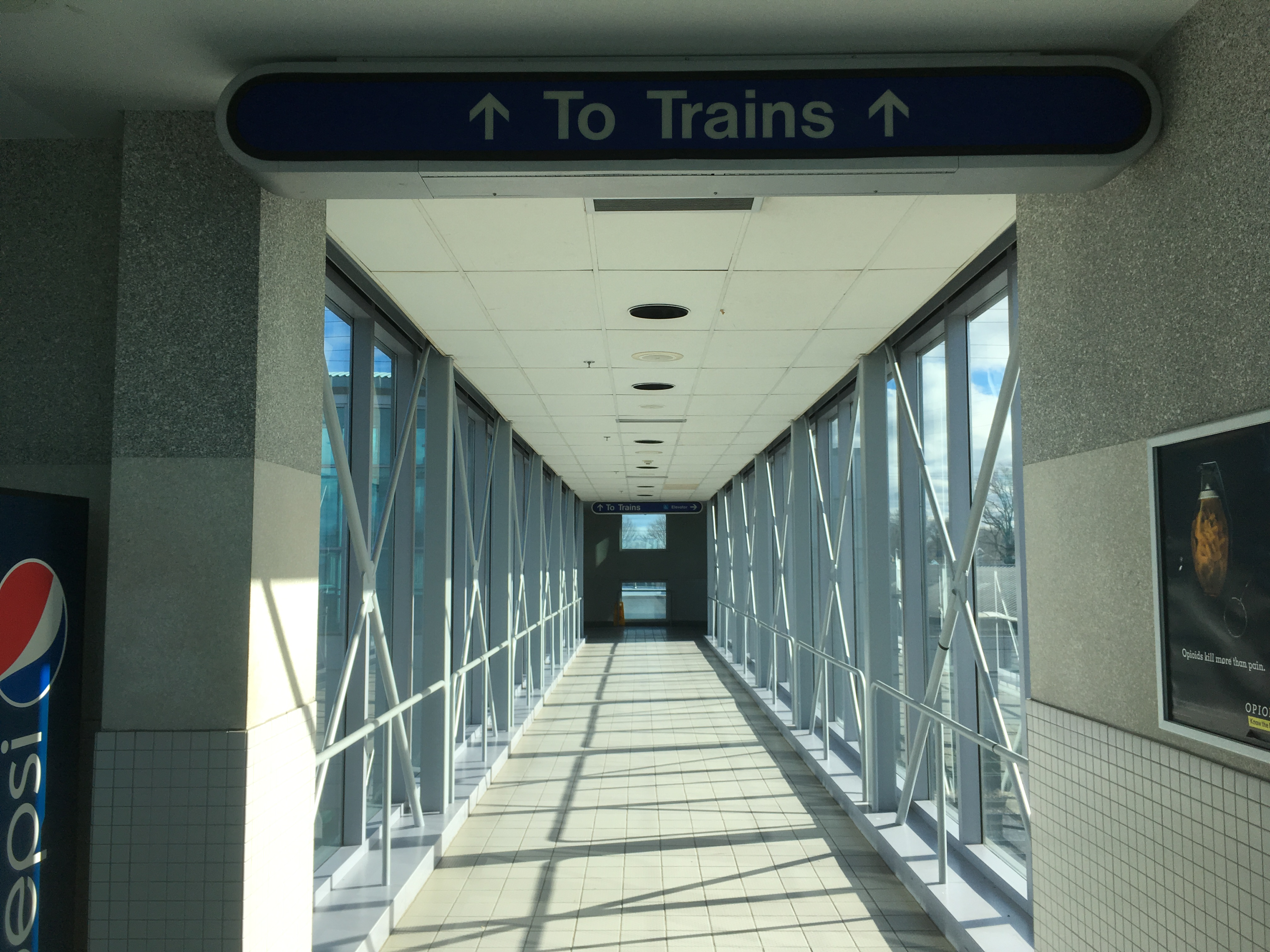

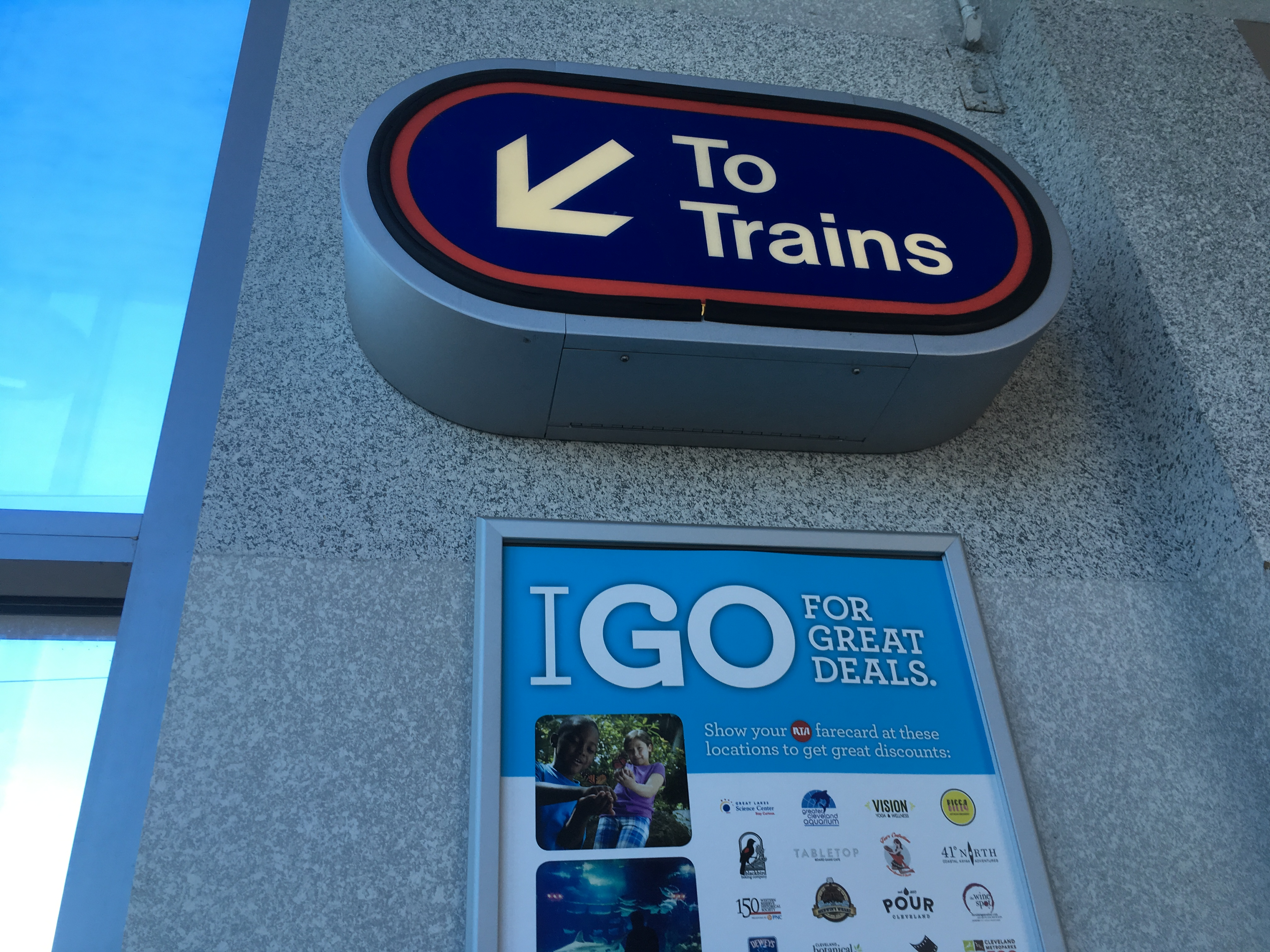

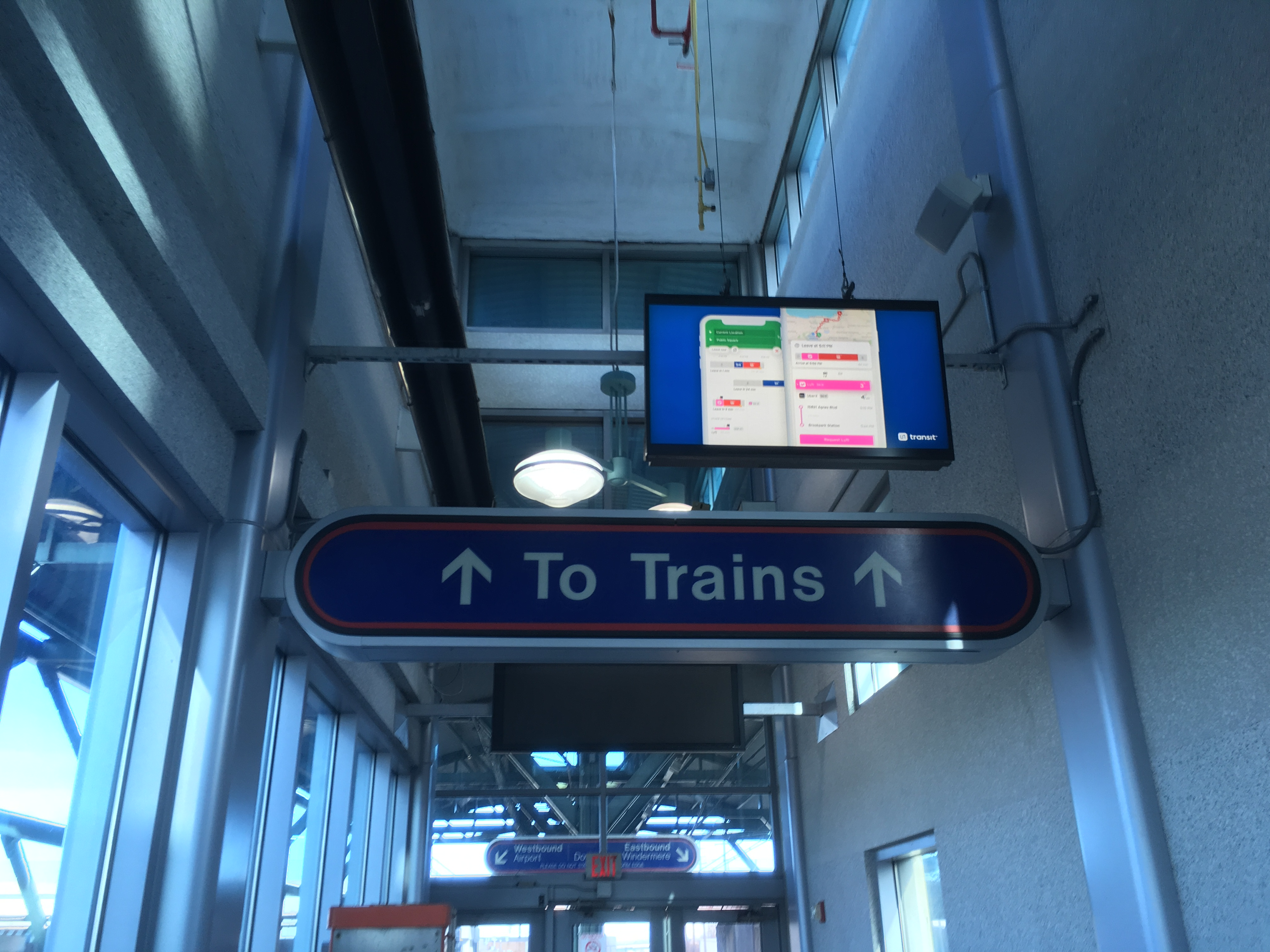

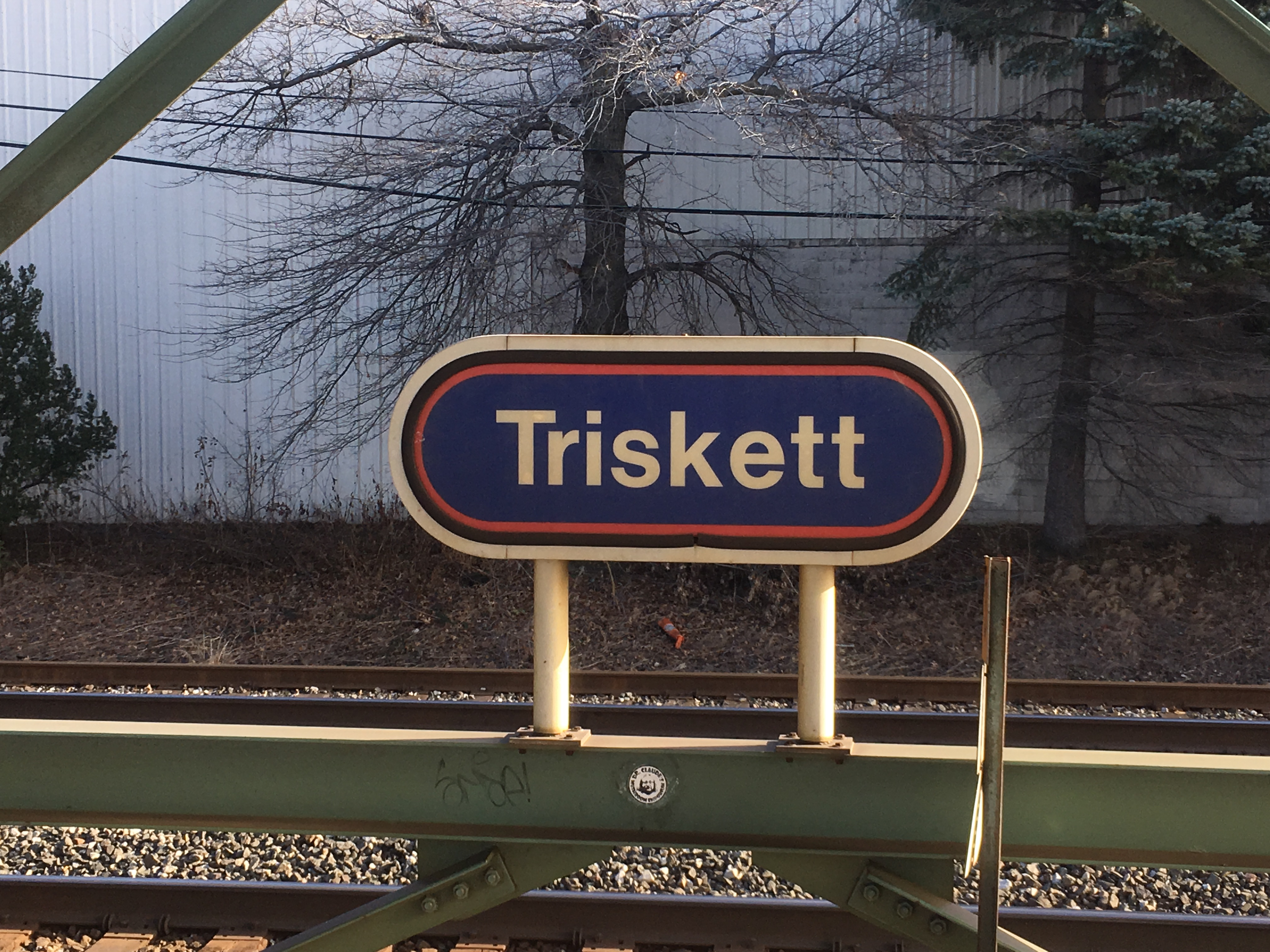

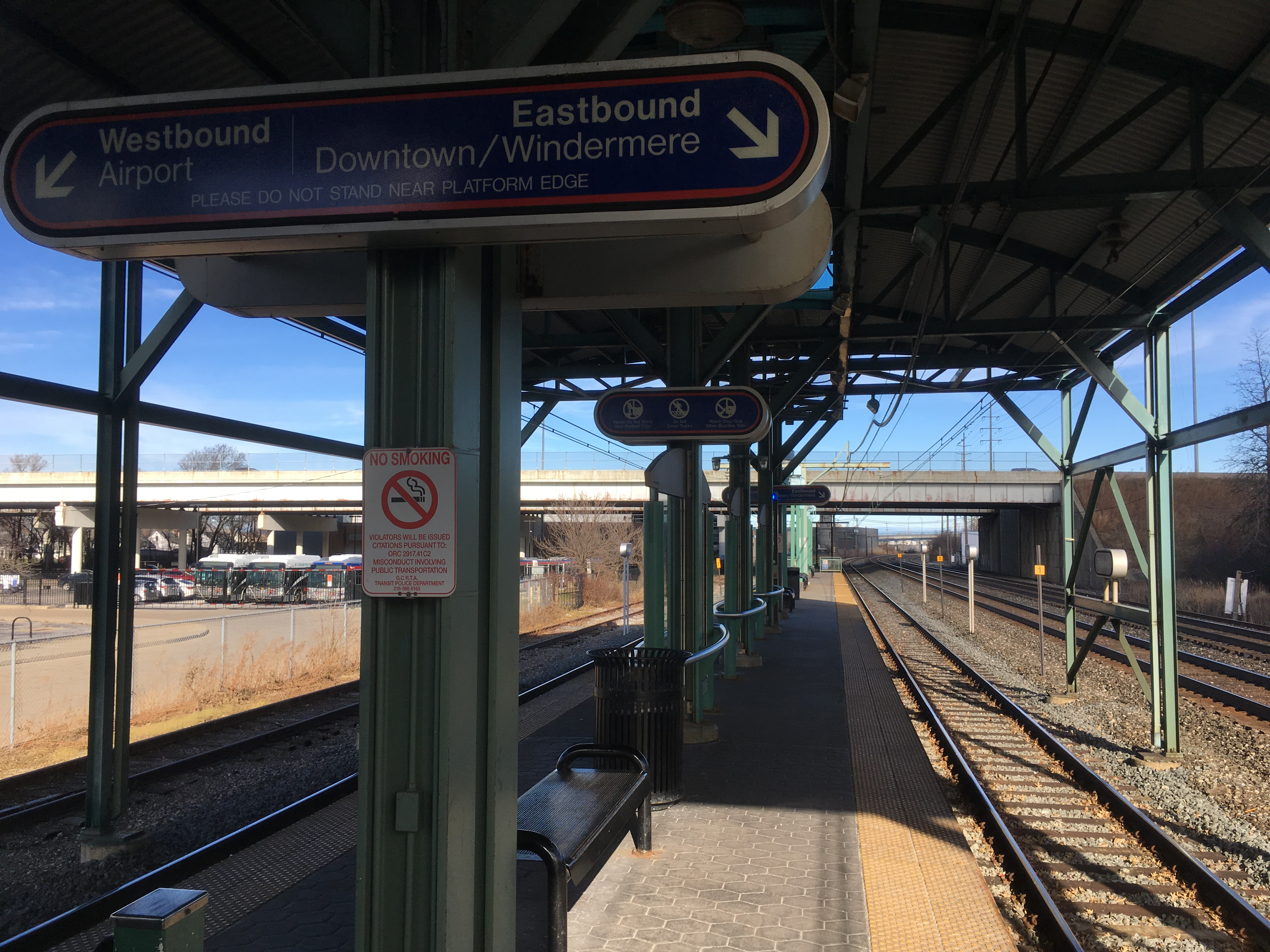

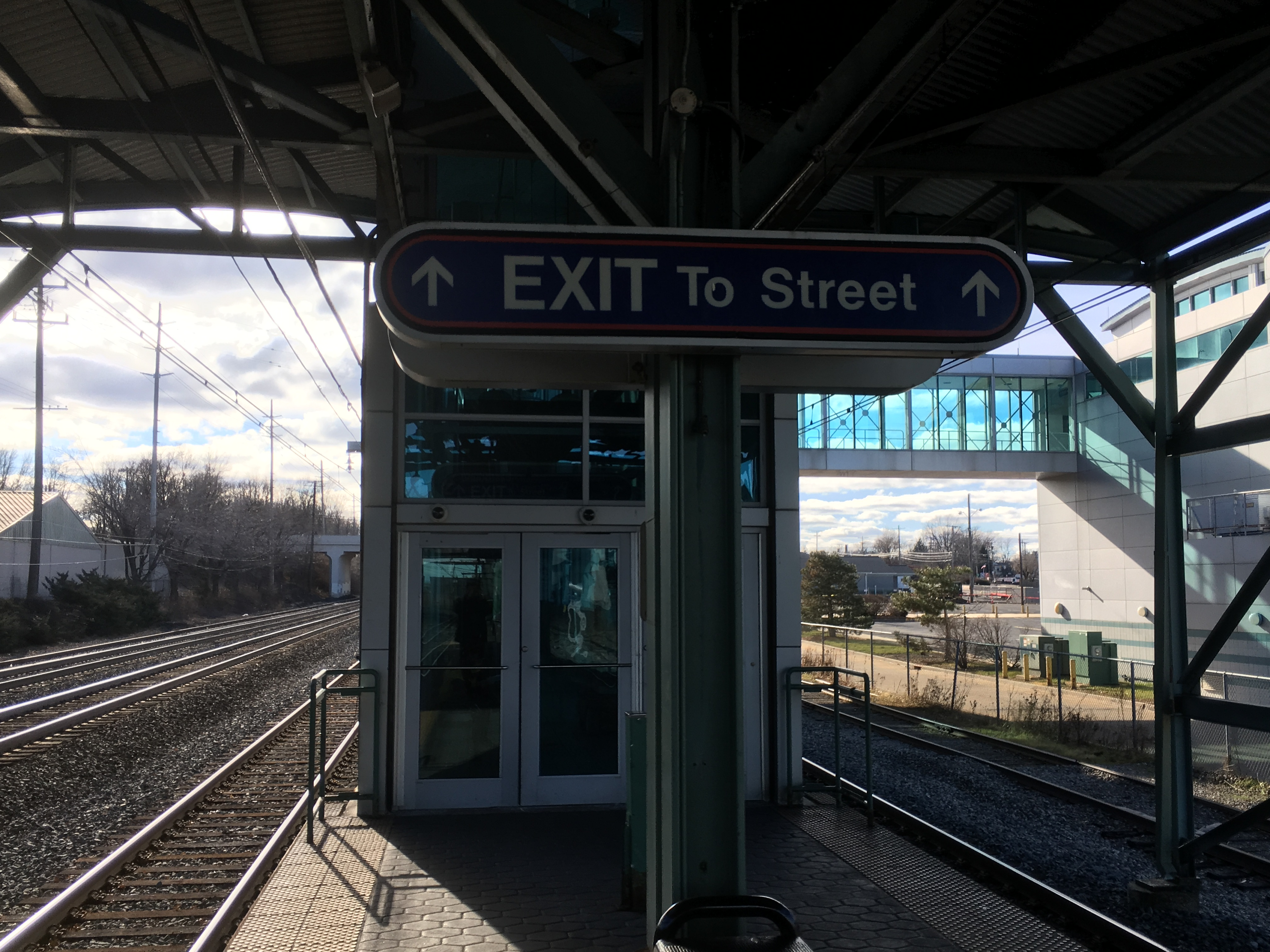

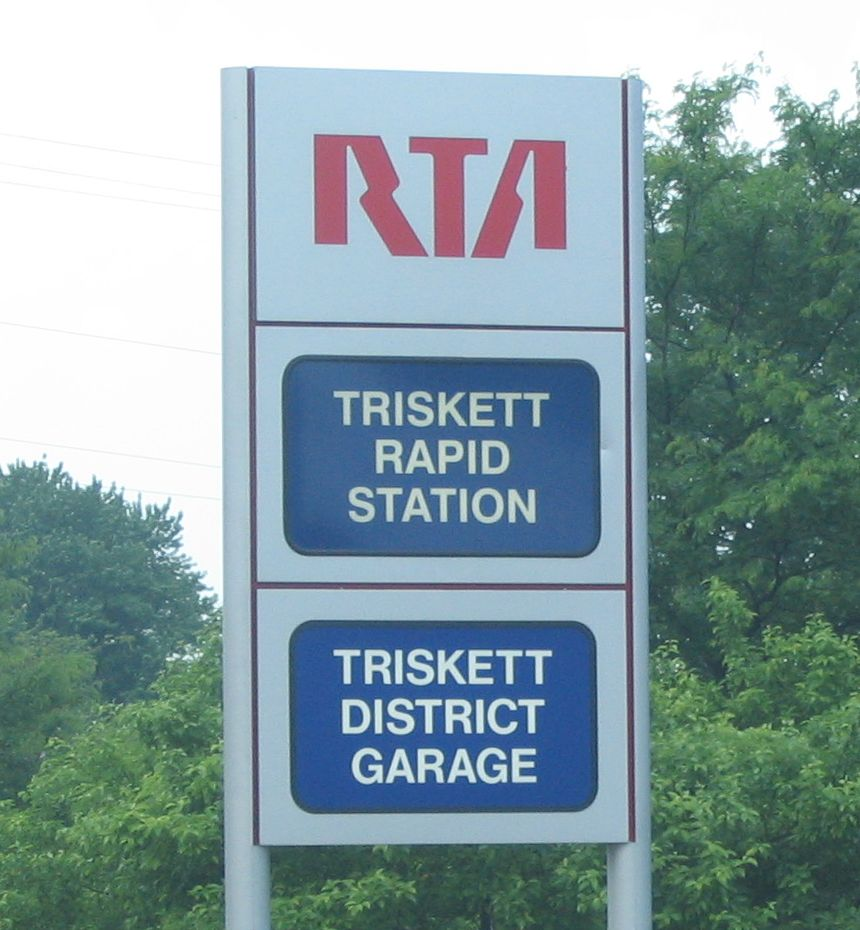

== Artwork ==
The station includes holographic glass panels on the bridge and windscreens on the platform created by artist Michael Hayden.
