= Southington station =

Southington station may refer to:

- Southington station (GCRTA Blue Line), a station on Van Aken Boulevard in Shaker Heights, Ohio
- Southington station (GCRTA Green Line), a station on Shaker Boulevard in Shaker Heights, Ohio
