= Westgate Mall (Ohio) =

Defunct shopping center in Ohio

- Location: Fairview Park, Ohio, USA
- Coordinates: 41.46008°N 81.849818°W
- Opened: 1954
- Closed: 2005 (original)
- Previous names: Westgate Center

Westgate Mall is a Greater Cleveland suburban shopping center established in the mid-1950s and revitalized in 2007 after a decline in visitors since the 1990s. The original building was located at the intersection of Center Ridge Road and West 210th Street Fairview Park, Ohio at the boundary of Rocky River, Ohio. Westgate Mall is now known as "Westgate", and is now an outdoor shopping center.

== History ==
=== Beginning ===
Built several years after the close of World War II, the original Westgate Center opened in 1954. The first such shopping mall in Greater Cleveland, 8.5 miles (13.7 km) from downtown's Public Square, and the first suburban shopping mall in Ohio, as one of the first post-war suburban retail centers with department store anchors in the United States, situated on a 55-acre (22 ha) parcel. The original anchors of what was then an open-air plaza of separate stores and outdoor walkways were a 3-level Halle Bros. Co., 2-level Federal's department store, a Kroger supermarket, and in 1961 Federal's built a new one-level store across the lot from Halle's and the former Federal's become the first suburban store for Higbee's department store.

Eventually, Higbee's also took over the newer Federal Department Store space when Federal's closed in 1969, but not before Spartan-Atlantic opened in the location in 1969 until 1972. Higbee's moved their Home Store to this location in 1973. The center was roofed over in the late 1960s to compete with neighboring newer Parmatown Mall 8 miles (13 km) southeast and Great Northern Mall 4.5 miles (7.2 km) southwest of Westgate Mall.

In 1972, a four-screen movie theater operated by General Cinema Corporation was constructed. Halle's closed on November 10, 1982, when the chain went out of business.

In 1984, the Richard E. Jacobs Group, a Cleveland-based real estate developer, took ownership of the complex and began renovations and remerchandising to aim for the upper-income buyers surrounding the mall. Pittsburgh-based Joseph Horne Co. opened in the former Halle space on March 12, 1987, following a week-long soft opening. In 1988, the Promenade Food Court was added to replace the original movie theatres. A new six-screen General Cinema cineplex was built behind the mall in a satellite building near the Higbee's Home Store.

=== Decline ===
The 1990s saw another decline of the complex as newer facilities like Great Northern Mall in nearby and far-flung suburbs, a revitalized Downtown Cleveland and a recession-battered economy took its toll. Higbee's was taken over by Dillard's in 1992, which then bought out the Horne's store, creating a unique three-unit operation with ladies apparel in the north store, men's & children's items and housewares in the south wing and furniture & electronics in the outlying Home Store. Eventually, the Home Store was closed when Dillard's discontinued electronics and furniture in their Cleveland area locations. In 1996, Kohl's built a two-level store adjacent to the Promenade, which temporarily boosted the struggling mall's fortunes, but eventually the aging mall continued its downward trend. Many stores followed their customers to other locations or simply vanished due to their own corporate problems. Dillard's eliminated non-apparel items in early 2004 and consolidated into the north store, which it eventually closed at the end of March 2005. Almost immediately, the remaining mall stores began leaving, and the cineplex, now owned by AMC, was also closed.

=== Redevelopment ===
A major redevelopment was announced in late May 2005, which planned to convert the center into a lifestyle open-air center. During this redevelopment, both closed Dillard's, the interior of the mall, & plaza in front were demolished to make way for new buildings.

The new Westgate (dropping "mall" from the name) was opened in Fall of 2007. Westgate is an outdoor center with anchors Target, Petco, Lowe's, Marshalls, Books-A-Million, and others that have followed. Kohl's remained open during the redevelopment. Other stores include Ulta, Verizon, Great Clips, Five Below, Justice, Famous Footwear, Starbucks, Chick-fil-A, and The Original Pancake House.

In June, 2025, it was announced that Phillips Edison & Company (PECO) acquired the 311,440-square-foot Westgate Shopping Center in Fairview Park, Ohio, for $51.5 million. The property ranks among the top 2% of most-visited retail destinations in Ohio, attracting 6.3 million annual visitors.
