= Lee–Shaker station =

Rapid transit station in Cleveland

Lee–Shaker
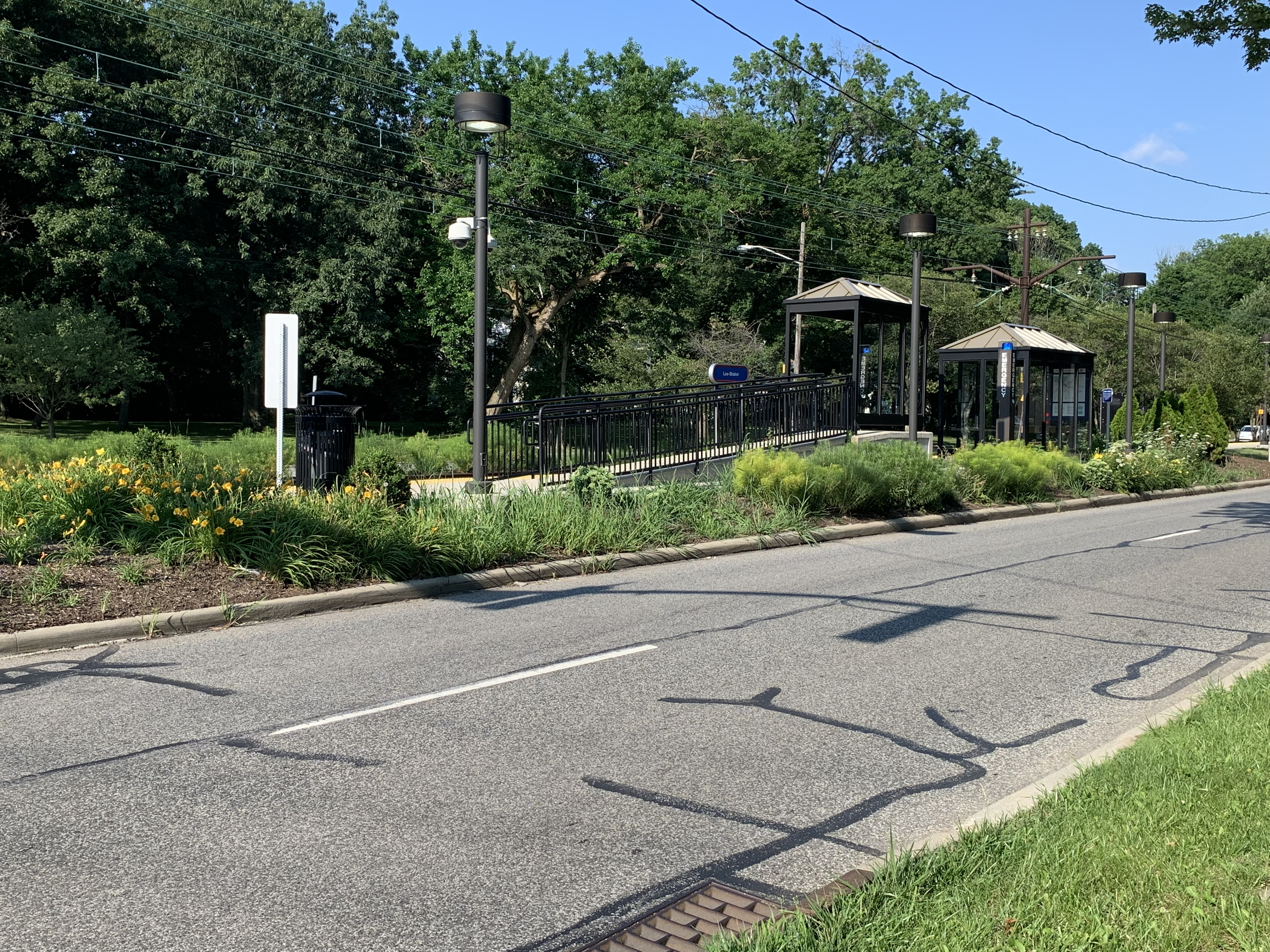
- Lee–Shaker station eastbound platform in July 2021

General information
- Location: 16400 Shaker Boulevard; Shaker Heights, Ohio
- Coordinates: 41°28′51″N 81°33′54″W
- Owner: City of Shaker Heights
- Operator: Greater Cleveland Regional Transit Authority
- Line: Shaker Boulevard
- Platforms: 2 side platforms
- Tracks: 2
- Connections: RTA: 40

Construction
- Structure type: At-grade
- Accessible: Yes

Other information
- Website: riderta.com/facilities/shakerlee

History
- Opened: December 17, 1913; 112 years ago
- Rebuilt: 1980, 2017
- Original company: Cleveland Railway

Services
Preceding station	Rapid Transit	Following station
South Park toward Tower City	Green Line	Attleboro toward Green Road
Location

Lee–Shaker station is a station on the RTA Green Line in Shaker Heights, Ohio, located in the median of Shaker Boulevard (Ohio State Route 87) at its intersection with Lee Road, after which the station is named.

== History ==
The station opened on December 17, 1913, with the initiation of rail service on what is now Shaker Boulevard from Coventry Road to Fontenay Road. The line was built by Cleveland Interurban Railroad and initially operated by the Cleveland Railway.

In 1980 and 1981, the Green and Blue Lines were completely renovated with new track, ballast, poles and wiring, and new stations were built along the line. The renovated line along Shaker Boulevard opened on October 11, 1980.

On October 17, 2017, a new station was opened at Lee and Shaker, with two new handicapped ramps, and four new shelters.

== Station layout ==
The station has two side platforms, split across the intersection with Lee Road. Unlike most other stations on the line, Lee–Shaker station has far side platforms with stops taking place after trains cross Lee Road. This allows for left turn pocket lanes on Shaker Boulevard. Each platform has shelter and covered mini-high platforms which allow passengers with disabilities to access trains.
