= Drexmore station =

Rapid transit station in Cleveland

Drexmore
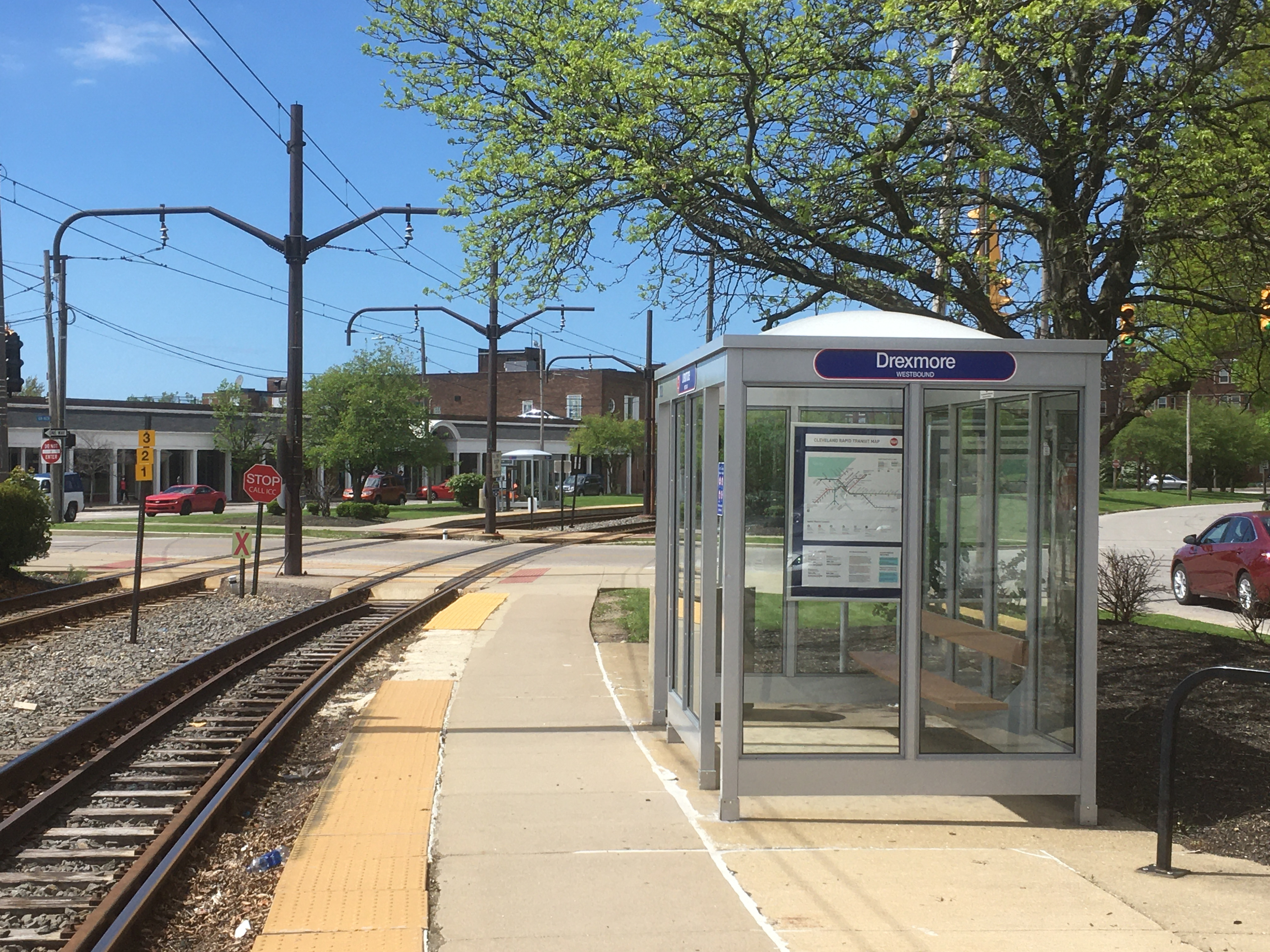
- Drexmore station eastbound platform in May 2020

General information
- Location: 2770 Van Aken Boulevard; Cleveland, Ohio
- Coordinates: 41°28′56″N 81°35′18″W
- Owner: City of Shaker Heights
- Operator: Greater Cleveland Regional Transit Authority
- Line: Van Aken Boulevard
- Platforms: 2 side platforms
- Tracks: 2

Construction
- Structure type: At-grade
- Parking: 65 spaces
- Cycle facilities: Racks
- Accessible: No

Other information
- Website: riderta.com/facilities/drexmore

History
- Opened: January 23, 1948; 78 years ago
- Rebuilt: 1981
- Original company: Cleveland Railway

Services
Preceding station	Rapid Transit	Following station
Shaker Square toward Tower City	Blue Line	South Woodland toward Warrensville–Van Aken
Location

Drexmore station is a station on the RTA Blue Line in Cleveland, Ohio, located in the median of Van Aken Boulevard at its intersection with Drexmore Road, after which the station is named.

== History ==
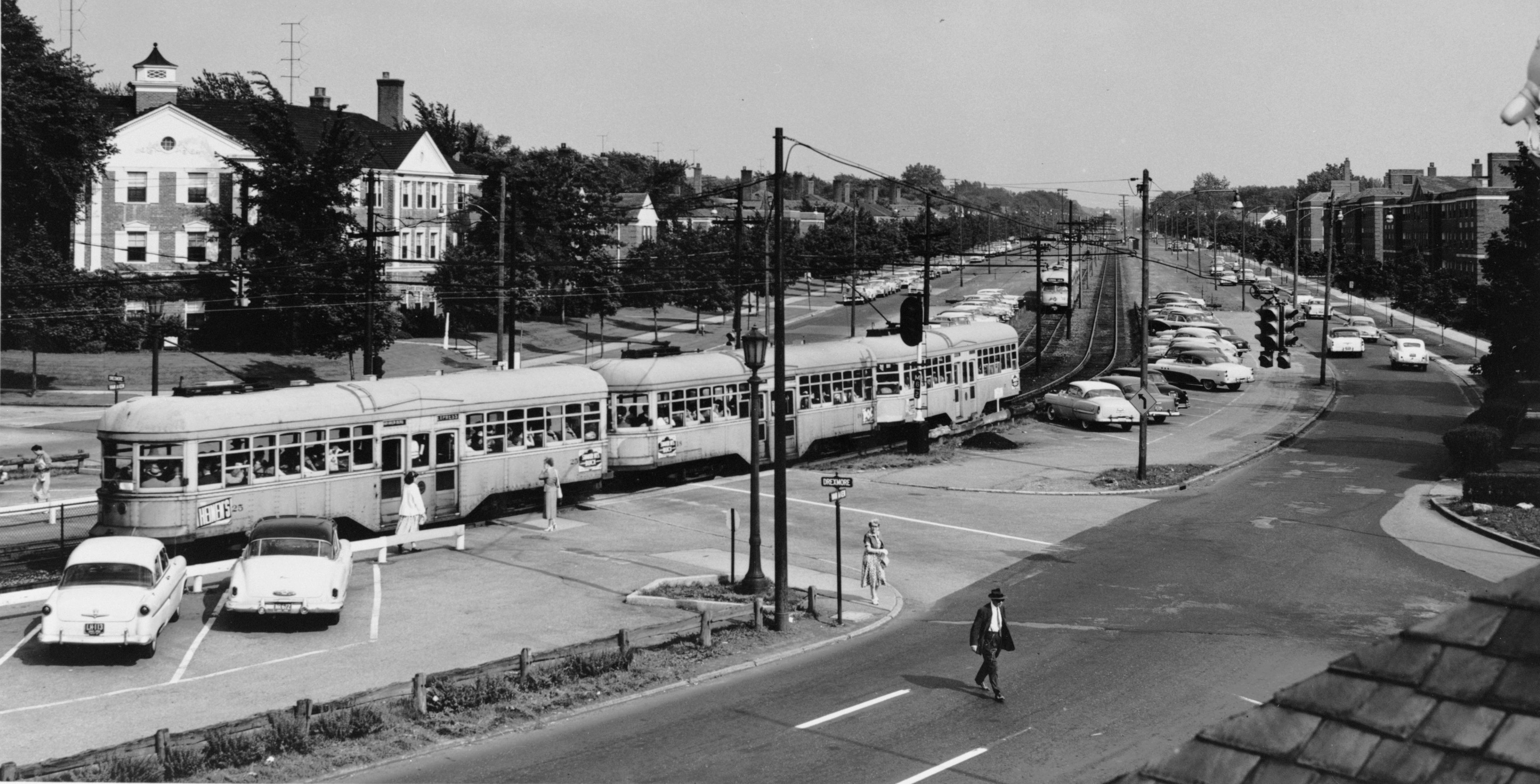
A three-car train of 1200-type cars stops at Drexmore station in 1956 as a PCC car approaches.

Service by the Cleveland Interurban Railroad began on Moreland (now Van Aken) Boulevard on April 11, 1920, from Lynnfield Road to Shaker Square and then to East 34th Street and via surface streets to downtown.

Ownership of the line passed to the City of Shaker Heights in 1944. In 1946, the city wanted to build a turnaround loop in the middle of Shaker Square, and would need to submit the proposal to Cleveland City Council. The Shaker Square merchants resisted, and eventually a compromise was worked out permitting the construction of the loop. In return, the City agreed to construct a new station at Drexmore Road serving the eastern end of the Shaker Square development (the Shaker Square station was on the western side of the Square). The new station opened in January 1948.

In 1980 and 1981, the Green and Blue Lines were completely renovated with new track, ballast, poles and wiring, and new stations were built along the line. The renovated line along Van Aken Boulevard opened on October 30, 1981.

== Station layout ==
The station has two narrow side platforms in the center median of Van Aken Boulevard, split across the intersection with Drexmore Road. The westbound platform is southeast of the intersection, and the eastbound platform is north of the intersection. Each platform has a small shelter, and diagonal parking is available on both sides of Van Aken Boulevard adjacent to the westbound platform. The station does not have ramps to allow passengers with disabilities to access trains.
