= Hirt's Gardens =

Retail greenhouse in Ohio, US

- Company type: Privately Held
- Industry: Gardening
- Founded: 1915 Strongsville, Ohio, US
- Headquarters: Granger Township, Medina County, Ohio, US
- Products: Seeds, plants, and accessories
- Website: www.hirts.com

Hirt's Gardens is a retail greenhouse located in Granger Township, Medina County, Ohio, that sells seeds, seedlings, and mature plants.

== Media coverage ==
Hirt's Gardens started as a small family business and is managed today by Matthew Hirt, the great-grandson of founder Sam Hirt, it has received national coverage.

Hirt's Gardens

The Hirt family's greenhouses have received recognition in various historical and horticultural publications. Their greenhouse architecture was featured in the book Images of America: Strongsville by Bruce M. Courey and has been noted in historical society books like Strongsville: We Shape Our Destiny, 1968. Additionally, Hirt's Gardens is referenced as a valuable resource on Ohio State University's Horticulture and Crop Science Resource page.

== History ==
Hirt's Gardens is a family business that has operated continuously since 1915 and is one of the oldest retail greenhouses in Ohio. Started by Sam and Anna Hirt, its early focus was on horseradish and vegetables, which Sam Hirt sold in Cleveland.

Hirt's Greenhouse in 1940

It is believed that Sam intended to pass the business directly to his eldest son, Paul Hirt, but he tragically died in 1918 when the merchant ship he was on, the Otranto, sank off the coast of England." So Sam Hirt passed the business to some of his other sons, most notably Lawrence Hirt, Arthur Hirt, and Hobart Hirt. Lawrence and Arthur started Hirt's Wholesale, which supplied florists supplies, vegetable seedlings, and houseplants to the retail business run by Hobart and his wife, Onalee (née Baker). The retail business was initially called Strongsville Greenhouse and was located at 13867 Pearl Rd, Strongsville, Ohio.

Hirt's Gardens today

The three children of Hobart and Onalee Hirt were Marie, Clare, and Alan. All worked at the greenhouse in the 1960s and 1970s, and the business was passed on to Clare and Alan in the mid-1970s, who were joined by a third business partner, Paul King, whom they had met at Ohio State University. By then, the greenhouses were known as Hirt's Greenhouse and Flowers. For a while, they operated small florists' outlets at two popular northeast Ohio malls, Great Northern Mall and Beachwood Place. Alan Hirt (along with his wife at the time, Karen Hirt) found great success appearing on local news and radio shows, where they answered common gardening questions. By the late 1990s, the successful business included a floral shop and 14 greenhouses wall-to-wall at the intersections of Pearl Road and Royalton Road, one of the busiest corners in Strongsville.

In 2004, the property was sold to developers, but the business continued. Clare Hirt assumed control of the floral division, renaming it Hirt's Flowers, and relocated it down the road from the original establishment to 14407 Pearl Rd. Hirt's Flowers was subsequently sold in 2014, and while it still bears the Hirt name, it is no longer under the management of the Hirt family. Meanwhile, Alan Hirt and his son, Matthew Hirt, took charge of the horticultural aspect of the business, which is now referred to as Hirt's Gardens and is situated at 4943 Ridge Rd. The original Strongsville greenhouses were demolished in 2005.
