= North Olmsted Municipal Bus Line =

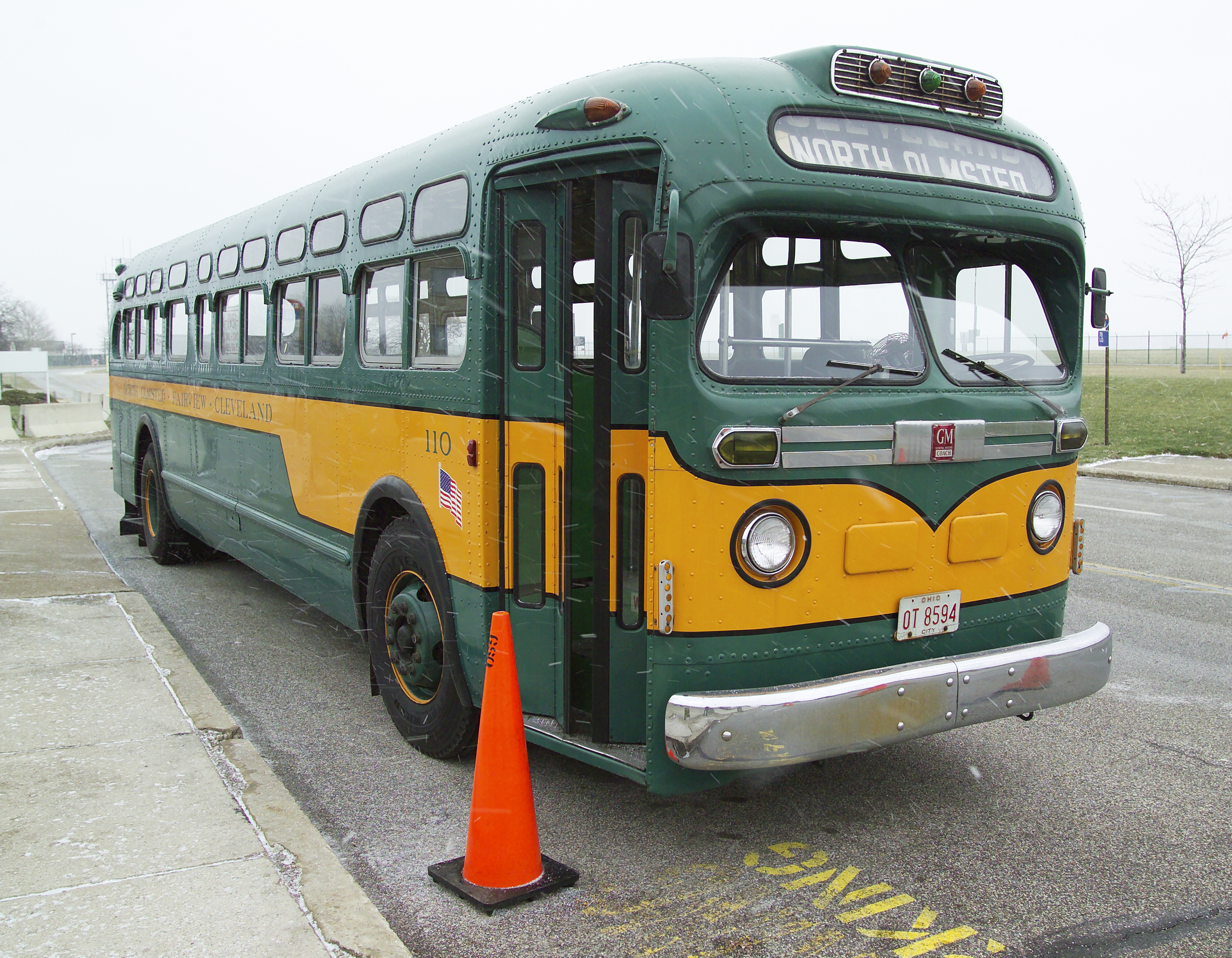
A NOMBL bus

The North Olmsted Municipal Bus Line (NOMBL) was a public transit agency in Northeast Ohio. The NOMBL was one of the first and one of the oldest municipal transit systems in the United States and was in continuous operation for over 74 years. It served the cities of North Olmsted; Fairview Park; Olmsted Falls; Westlake; Rocky River; Olmsted Township; and parts of the west side of and downtown Cleveland. NOMBL does not refer to a single bus line, but rather a collection of routes which until 2005 was semi-autonomous but partially integrated into the Greater Cleveland Regional Transit Authority (GCRTA).

== Founding & Integration into GCRTA ==
NOMBL was founded as a division of the Village of North Olmsted in response to the discontinuation of the Cleveland-Southwestern interurban rail system; it began operations at 5:15 AM on March 1, 1931; its revenues on its first day of operation was $24.65. Until approximately 1972 the NOMBL was able to fund operational costs with farebox revenues. The City of North Olmsted had to begin some financial operating subsidies to NOMBL beginning in 1972 and also applied for financial operating and capital bus purchase assistance from UMTA until the GCRTA countywide Cuyahoga County 1% sales tax revenues began in September, 1975; in which NOMBL was then reimbursed for normal operating costs. Also, at this time all farebox revenues for NOMBL operated routes were collected by the GCRTA instead of the City of North Olmsted.

In February, 1982 the NOMBL garage and storage facility at 27311 Lorain Road was completely destroyed in a devastating fire. This fire also destroyed four City titled coaches, non-revenue vehicles, records boxes and the entire tire storage area and part rooms. The NOMBL main office and dispatch center in the adjacent two story former police station was left intact along with more current records. The City rented a former car dealership further west on Lorain Road and the entire NOMBL operation was relocated there for approximately eighteen months while a new garage was built at the original site of the destroyed garage.

The integration of NOMBL into GCRTA took place gradually and in several steps, between the years 1975 to 2005. This integration was part of the general trend of integration of city transit agencies into GCRTA. NOMBL and the Maple Heights Transit System were the last remaining public transit agencies to be taken over in Cuyahoga County and remained Divisions of their respective municipalities until March 20, 2005. The integration of these public transit systems has been the subject of much controversy, attracting the involvement of Dennis Kucinich, who opposed the integration of NOMBL into GCRTA.

As of March 20, 2005, NOMBL was completely integrated into GCRTA. Approximately 50 employees from the NOMBL were transferred to the GCRTA and were no longer employees of the City of North Olmsted. The remaining employees either retired or resigned from their positions prior to this acquisition and integration. The former NOMBL garage facility at 27311 Lorain Road is owned by the City of North Olmsted and now used for their Service Department and for storage.

== Routes ==
NOMBL operated five primary routes, with approximately 42 transit coaches, prior to the integration into the GCRTA:

- 75X North Olmsted
- 263 North Olmsted Park-and-Ride
- 53 Great Northern-Center Ridge
- 87F Westwood-I-90 Flyer
- 96F Butternut-Hilliard I-90 Flyer

NOMBL also provided supplementary services for school students to North Olmsted High School, St. Ignatius High School, St. Edward High School, Magnificat High School, Lutheran West High School and St. Joseph Academy. Services to home Cleveland Browns Football games were also provided from the North Olmsted Park-and-Ride lot by the NOMBL. In year 2004 the final full year of services and prior to be acquired by the GCRTA in March, 2005, it is estimated that over 1.2 million passengers were carried on the routes and services operated by the NOMBL.

The entrance road to the North Olmsted Park-and-Ride has been dedicated as "NOMBL Lane" to commemorate the seventy-four years that the NOMBL was in operation as a division of the Village and later the City of North Olmsted.
