= South Park station =

South Park station may refer to:

- South Park station (GCRTA), an RTA Rapid Transit Green Line station in Shaker Heights, Ohio (Greater Cleveland)
- South Park station (PAAC), a Pittsburgh Light Rail Blue Line station in Bethel Park, Pennsylvania (Greater Pittsburgh)
