= Eaton station =

Rapid transit station in Cleveland

Eaton
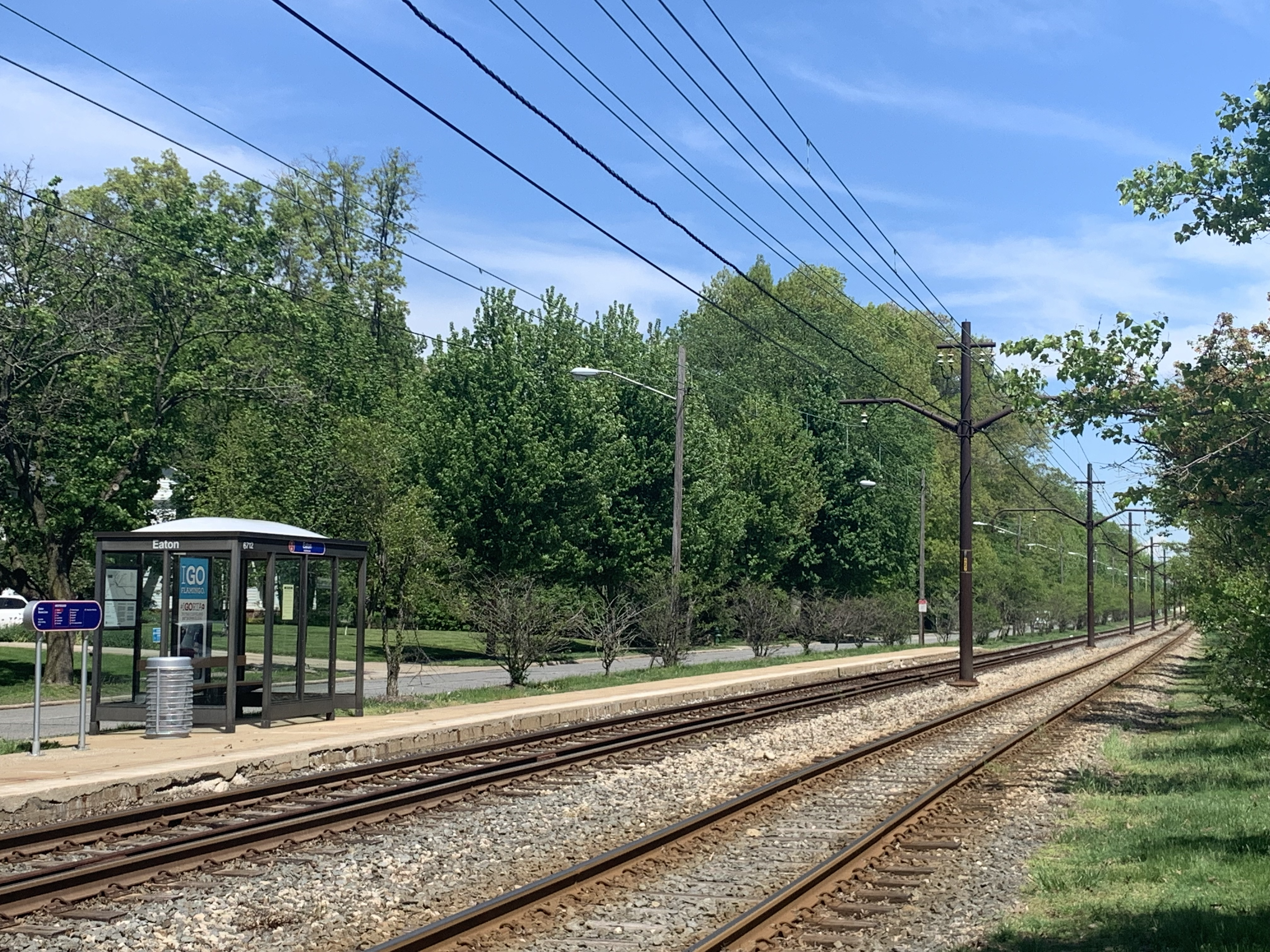
- Eaton station westbound platform

General information
- Location: 18500 Shaker Boulevard; Shaker Heights, Ohio
- Coordinates: 41°28′43″N 81°33′00″W
- Owner: City of Shaker Heights
- Operator: Greater Cleveland Regional Transit Authority
- Line: Shaker Boulevard
- Platforms: 2 side platforms
- Tracks: 2

Construction
- Structure type: At-grade
- Cycle facilities: Racks
- Accessible: No

Other information
- Website: riderta.com/facilities/eaton

History
- Opened: May 20, 1915; 111 years ago
- Rebuilt: 1980
- Original company: Cleveland Railway

Services
Preceding station	Rapid Transit	Following station
Attleboro toward Tower City	Green Line	Courtland toward Green Road
Location

Eaton station is a stop on the RTA light rail Green Line in Shaker Heights, Ohio, located in the median of Shaker Boulevard (Ohio State Route 87) at its intersection with Eaton Road, after which the station is named.

== History ==
The station opened on May 20, 1915, when rail service on what is now Shaker Boulevard was extended from its previous terminus Fontenay Road two blocks west of here for 3/5 mile (0.97 km) east to Courtland Boulevard. The rail line was built by Cleveland Interurban Railroad and initially operated by the Cleveland Railway.

In 1980 and 1981, the Green and Blue Lines were completely renovated with new track, ballast, poles and wiring, and new stations were built along the line. The renovated line along Shaker Boulevard opened on October 11, 1980.

== Station layout ==
The station has two narrow side platforms, split across the intersection with Eaton Road. Westbound trains stop at a platform with a small shelter east of the intersection before crossing Eaton Road. Eastbound trains stop at a platform west of the intersection before crossing. The station does not have ramps to allow passengers with disabilities to access trains.
