= South Woodland station =

Rapid transit station in Cleveland

South Woodland
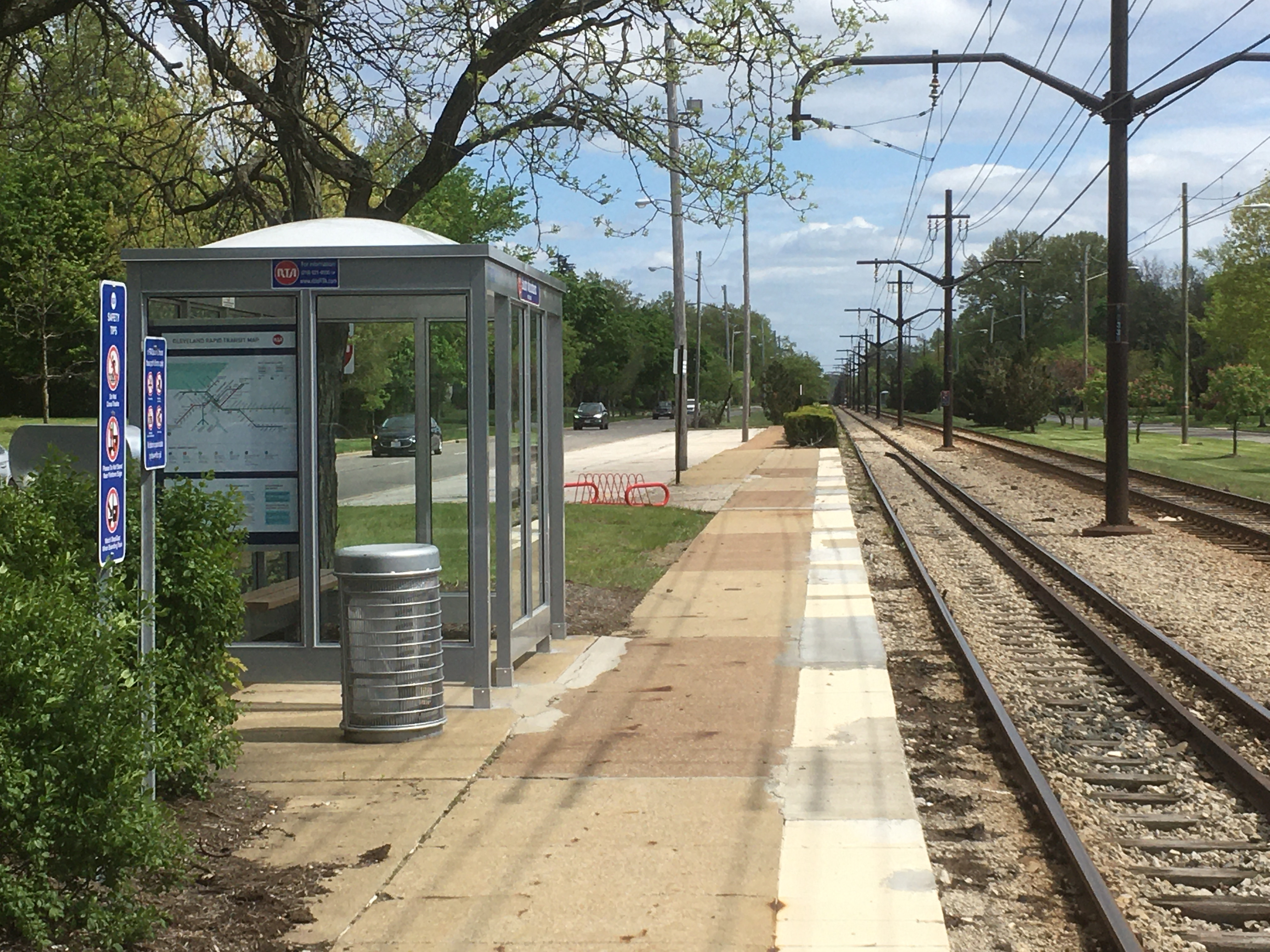
- South Woodland station from the westbound platform

General information
- Location: 2977 Van Aken Boulevard; Cleveland, Ohio
- Coordinates: 41°28′45″N 81°35′5″W
- Owner: City of Shaker Heights
- Operator: Greater Cleveland Regional Transit Authority
- Line: Van Aken Boulevard
- Platforms: 2 side platforms
- Tracks: 2

Construction
- Structure type: At-grade
- Parking: 74 spaces
- Cycle facilities: Racks
- Accessible: No

Other information
- Website: riderta.com/facilities/southwoodland

History
- Opened: April 11, 1920; 106 years ago
- Rebuilt: 1981
- Original company: Cleveland Railway

Services
Preceding station	Rapid Transit	Following station
Drexmore toward Tower City	Blue Line	Southington toward Warrensville–Van Aken
Location

South Woodland station is a stop on the RTA Blue Line on the border between Cleveland and Shaker Heights, Ohio, located in the median of Van Aken Boulevard at its intersection with South Woodland Road, after which the station is named.

== History ==
The station opened on April 11, 1920, with the initiation of rail service by the Cleveland Interurban Railroad on what is now Van Aken Boulevard from Lynnfield Road to Shaker Square and then to East 34th Street and via surface streets to downtown.

In 1980 and 1981, the Green and Blue Lines were completely renovated with new track, ballast, poles and wiring, and new stations were built along the line. The renovated line along Van Aken Boulevard opened on October 30, 1981.

== Station layout ==
The station has two narrow side platforms in the center median of Van Aken Boulevard, split across the intersection with South Woodland Road. The westbound platform is southeast of the intersection, and the eastbound platform is northwest of the intersection. The eastbound platform is located in Cleveland, while the westbound platform is located in Shaker Heights. Each platform has a small shelter, and diagonal parking is available on both sides of Van Aken Boulevard adjacent to the eastbound platform and on the westbound side of Van Aken adjacent to the westbound platform. The station does not have ramps to allow passengers with disabilities to access trains.

== Notable places nearby ==
- Plymouth Church of Shaker Heights
