= Attleboro station =

Attleboro station may refer to:

- Attleboro station (Massachusetts), an MBTA train station in Attleboro, Massachusetts
- Attleboro (RTA Rapid Transit station), a rapid transit station in Shaker Heights, Ohio
- South Attleboro (MBTA station), another MBTA train station in Attleboro, Massachusetts

== See also ==
- Attleborough (disambiguation)
- Attleborough railway station, England
