= Attleborough (disambiguation) =

Attleborough is a town in Norfolk, England.

Attleborough or Attleboro may also refer to:

- Attleborough, Warwickshire, England
- Attleboro, Massachusetts, United States
- Attleboro station (disambiguation), stations of the name
- Attleboro, former name of Langhorne, Pennsylvania

== See also ==
- North Attleborough, Massachusetts
- South Attleboro, Massachusetts
