= Southington station (GCRTA Blue Line) =

Rapid transit station in Cleveland

Southington
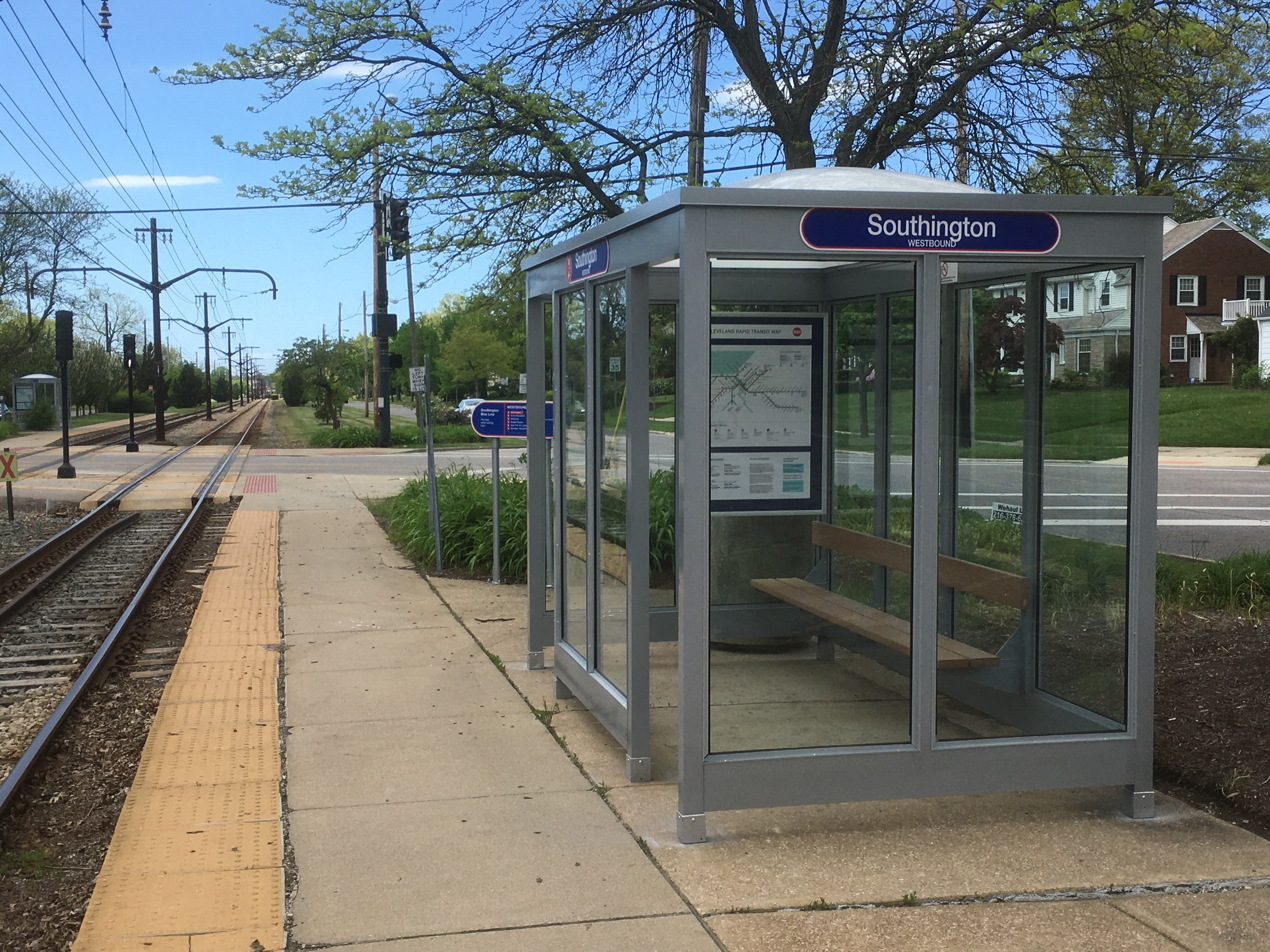
- Drexmore station westbound platform in May 2020

General information
- Location: 3090 Van Aken Boulevard; Shaker Heights, Ohio
- Coordinates: 41°28′32″N 81°34′51″W
- Owner: City of Shaker Heights
- Operator: Greater Cleveland Regional Transit Authority
- Line: Van Aken Boulevard
- Platforms: 2 side platforms
- Tracks: 2

Construction
- Structure type: At-grade
- Parking: 25 spaces
- Accessible: No

Other information
- Website: riderta.com/facilities/southingtonblue

History
- Opened: April 11, 1920; 106 years ago
- Rebuilt: 1981
- Original company: Cleveland Railway

Services
| Preceding station | Rapid Transit | Following station |
|---|---|---|
| South Woodland toward Tower City | Blue Line | Onaway toward Warrensville–Van Aken |
Location

Southington station is a station on the RTA Blue Line in Shaker Heights, Ohio, located in the median of Van Aken Boulevard at its intersection with Southington Road, after which the station is named.

== History ==
The station opened on April 11, 1920 with the initiation of rail service by the Cleveland Interurban Railroad on what is now Van Aken Boulevard from Lynnfield Road to Shaker Square and then to East 34th Street and via surface streets to downtown.

In 1980 and 1981, the Green and Blue Lines were completely renovated with new track, ballast, poles and wiring, and new stations were built along the line. The renovated line along Van Aken Boulevard opened on October 30, 1981.

== Station layout ==
The station has two narrow side platforms in the center median of Van Aken Boulevard, split across the intersection with Southington Road. The westbound platform is southeast of the intersection, and the eastbound platform is northwest of the intersection. Each platform has a small shelter and diagonal parking is provided off Van Aken Boulevard adjacent to each platform. The station does not have ramps to allow passengers with disabilities to access trains.
