= Severance Center =

- Location: Cleveland Heights, Ohio, United States
- Coordinates: 41.5160°N 81.5500°W
- Address: 3640 Mayfield Road
- Opened: October 17, 1963; 63 years ago (original indoor mall); 1986; 40 years ago (expansion) (original indoor mall); 1998; 28 years ago (conversion to power center)
- Closed: c. 1998 (original indoor mall)
- Architect: Victor Gruen
- Num. of stores: 90
- Num. of anchor tenants: 2 (3 in original indoor mall)
- Floor area: 900,000 sq ft (83,600 m^{2})
- Floors: 1
- Public transit: RTA

Severance Center, also known as Severance Town Center, is a shopping center located in Cleveland Heights, Ohio, an inner ring Greater Cleveland suburb roughly 7 miles (11 km) from downtown Cleveland.

It is anchored by The Home Depot, Dave's Markets, Marshalls, and OfficeMax, and four vacant anchors that were formerly Walmart, Borders Books, Conway, and Regal Cinemas. Prior to the development of the current power center, Severance Center was one of the first enclosed suburban malls in the United States.

== History ==
Severance Center resides on the land of the Longwood Estate, the home of John L. Severance and his family. As one of the foremost principals of Standard Oil and civic philanthropist, Severance built his estate to include dairy barn, several stables, gardeners' cottages, natural brooks and waterfalls, and extensive formal gardens.

Having no children of his own, the estate of John L. Severance transferred to his second cousin Severance Millikin in 1936. Millikin lived in Longwood until 1959, when he moved to a more secluded estate in Gates Mills. But for years before the move, Millikin worked on his plan for a "new downtown" on the former estate. In 1952, he requested rezoning that would pave the way for commercial development of the property. After five years of legal wrangling, the rezoning was approved, and Longwood was demolished in 1961.

Severance hired the Austin Company for the development plan which ended up acquiring the Longwood land and brought in the Winmar Corporation as a partner on the project. While the decision to build a large mall on the previously undeveloped land caused some controversy, the city eventually gave its assent to the plan.

As only a few years after Victor Gruen's visionary project Southdale Center opened in Edina, Minnesota, the shopping mall was a new concept. Opening to fanfare in October 1963, the mall's original anchors were Cleveland-based department stores Higbee's and Halle's. Other tenants at the new mall included Woolworth's, Richman Brothers, Peck and Peck, a bowling alley, movie theater, and a branch of Society National Bank. The center also featured an adjacent strip center, called the convenience wing, which included a True Value hardware store, a state-operated liquor store, and anchored by Fisher Foods.

The Severance project included Ohio's first regional mall as well as the since-demolished Austin Company headquarters opening in 1960, offices and apartments. The road around the Town Center, Severance Circle, is home to the Cleveland Heights City Hall, the Cleveland Heights Post Office, Metro Health Medical Center, Severance Medical Arts Building and Spectrum. There are also residential options at Severance.

=== Renovation ===
Severance Center underwent major renovation in 1972 and a new wing anchored by discounter Gold Circle opened off the south end of the mall in 1981. A year later, the entire Halle's chain was liquidated by an investor group that had purchased it from Chicago-based Marshall Field's. Gold Circle closed its underperforming Severance store in 1984.

A further renovation was completed 1986. The Gold Circle space was enlarged and leased to Dunham's Sporting Goods. The renovation included adding the 14-unit Galaxy Food Court and National Theatres Corporation Severance Movies 6-plex. This new theater, which opened April 5, 1986, operated in conjunction with the original venue, which had been divided in 1971 and renamed the Severance Movies Twin. In 1989, the Halle's space which sat vacant since 1982, was reconstructed and opened as a branch of Pittsburgh-based Horne's.

The entire complex was renamed Severance Town Center which then housed 100 stores, anchors Higbee's and Horne's, junior anchors Woolworth and Dunham's Sports, and the convenience wing with a Finast supermarket, which took over the Fisher Foods space. Other office, retail, and residential establishments were located along Severance Circle, the mall's peripheral ring road, including the Cleveland Heights City Hall, a Post Office, a Kaiser health center, the Severance Medical Arts Building, two drive-thru banks, and a restaurant.

=== Redevelopment ===
Horne's was shuttered on July 12, 1992, after only three years of business. At the same time, controlling interest in Higbee's was sold to Dillard's. This began a short time from August 1992 to June 1995. Higbee's became Dillard's East (a Women's store) with the old Halle's / Horne's re-opening as Dillard's West, which carried Men's, Children's & Home merchandise.

Severance Center which pioneered the enclosed shopping mall in Ohio was unable to compete with automobile-centric convenient big box retail or the renovated and expanded Beachwood Place and Richmond Town Square. With both Dillard's branches shuttered in 1995, declining occupancy, and rising criminal activity in and around the mall, plans surfaced to convert the enclosed portion into a power center. The Home Depot opened in the former Horne's space in 1998 and Walmart moved into the former Higbee's space a year later in 1999.

The enclosed mall itself was reconfigured into "big box" outlets occupied by OfficeMax, Marshalls, Borders Books, Conway, Famous Footwear, and a Regal 14-screen cinema. The supermarket space utilized by Finast then Tops Markets was sold to local supermarket chain, Dave's Markets.

The power center concept was initially successful in attracting shoppers back to Severance, but increasing crime, the attraction of newer retail centers, and changing consumer lifestyles brought new challenges to the center. In 2013, Walmart relocated from Severance to a new super center in nearby South Euclid. This cascaded with the closure of Border Books as part of the chain's liquidation and the 2015 closure of the Regal Cinema. Severance had several ownership and management changes, and the center was foreclosed of December 31, 2014, owing $38 million in debt.

Due to stagnation and then deterioration of the power center, the Severance Action Group, an outgrowth of the FutureHeights Planning & Development Committee, recognized Severance was an existential issue for Cleveland Heights over the long term and began to think about how Severance could be transformed. Complete with preliminary renderings, they presented to City Council on Monday (Nov. 14) a concept for a "medically and educationally based walkable village"—including more than 500 residential units and a nearly 5-acre park.

This proposal was presented to the Cleveland Heights Planning Commission and Board of Control for further discussion.
