= South Park station (GCRTA) =

Rapid transit station in Cleveland

South Park
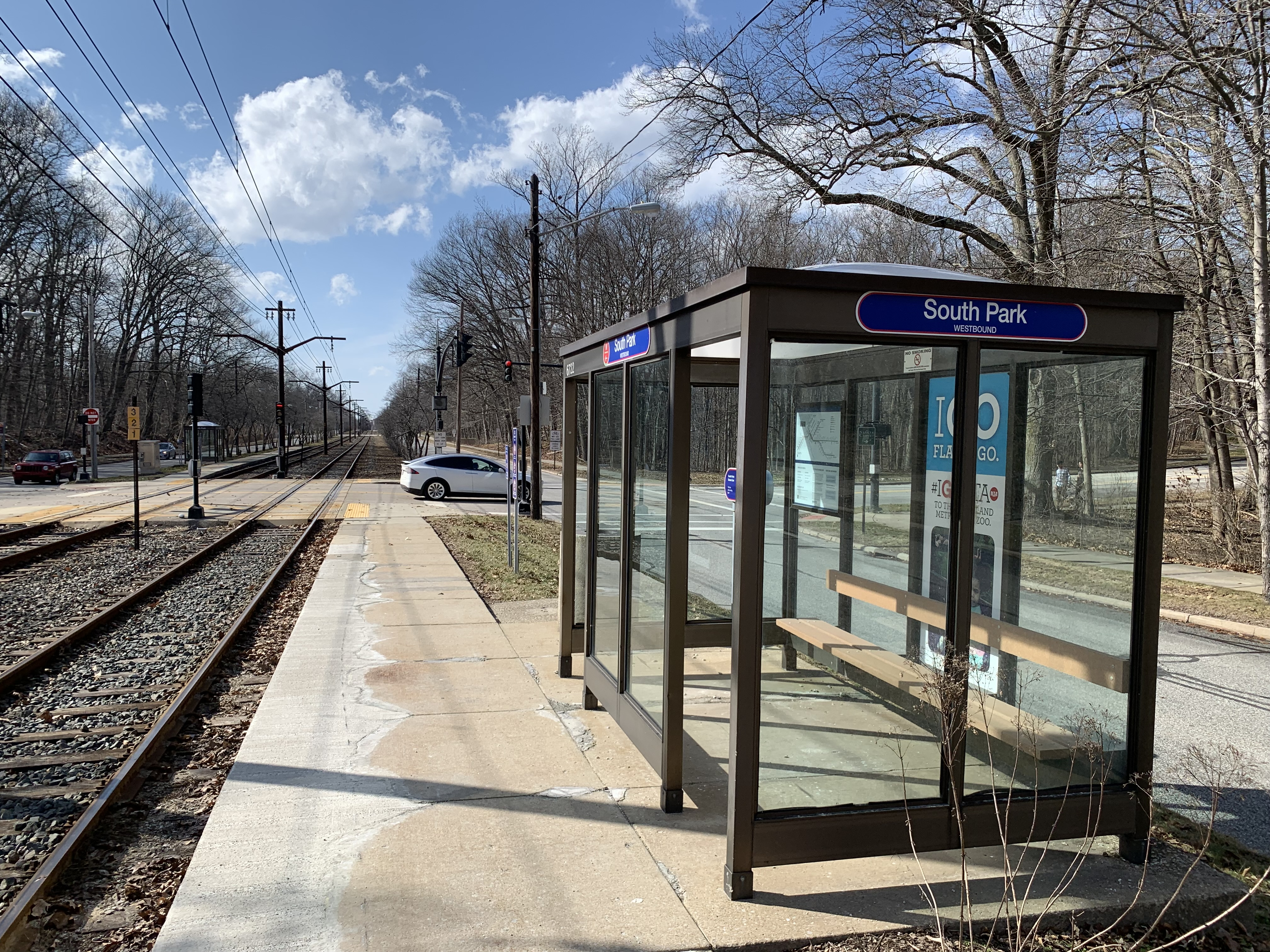
- South Park station westbound platform in March 2022

General information
- Location: 15700 Shaker Boulevard; Shaker Heights, Ohio
- Coordinates: 41°28′54″N 81°34′18″W
- Owner: City of Shaker Heights
- Operator: Greater Cleveland Regional Transit Authority
- Line: Shaker Boulevard
- Platforms: 2 side platforms
- Tracks: 2

Construction
- Structure type: At-grade
- Accessible: No

Other information
- Website: riderta.com/facilities/southpark

History
- Opened: December 17, 1913; 112 years ago
- Rebuilt: 1980
- Former names: Nature Center at South Park (2010–2018)
- Original company: Cleveland Railway

Services
Preceding station	Rapid Transit	Following station
Southington toward Tower City	Green Line	Lee–Shaker toward Green Road
Location

South Park station is a stop on the RTA Green Line in Shaker Heights, Ohio, located in the median of Shaker Boulevard (Ohio State Route 87) at its intersection with South Park Boulevard, after which the station is named.

== History ==
The station opened on December 17, 1913, with the initiation of rail service on what is now Shaker Boulevard from Coventry Road to Fontenay Road.

The line was built by Cleveland Interurban Railroad and initially operated by the Cleveland Railway.

In 1980 and 1981, the Green and Blue Lines were completely renovated with new track, ballast, poles and wiring, and new stations were built along the line. The renovated line along Shaker Boulevard opened on October 11, 1980.

== Station layout ==
The station has two narrow side platforms, split across the intersection with South Park Boulevard. Westbound trains stop at a platform with a small shelter east of the intersection before crossing South Park. Eastbound trains stop at a platform west of the intersection before crossing. The station does not have ramps to allow passengers with disabilities to access trains.

== Notable places nearby ==
- Nature Center at Shaker Lakes
