= Steelyard Commons =

Shopping center in Cleveland, Ohio which opened in 2007

Coordinates: 41°27′39″N 81°41′26″W

Steelyard Commons is a shopping center in Cleveland, Ohio, having opened in 2007. The center gets its name for having been built on the site of the former LTV Steel Factory #2 in the city's Tremont neighborhood which closed in 2001.

Tenants include Walmart, Target, Dollar Tree (formerly Deals), Home Depot, Taco Bell, Aldi, Steak 'n Shake, AT&T, Old Navy, Party City, Burlington Coat Factory, Bath & Body Works, VILLA, Panda Express, fitness center (formerly Best Buy and Spirit Halloween), Marshalls, Applebee's, IHOP, KeyBank, GameStop, Petco, Burger King, Five Guys and The Exchange (formerly BuyBacks).

== Relation to City View Center ==
In 2004, City View Center announced its opening, scheduled for 2006, coinciding with the construction of Steelyard Commons. The two centers were closely linked. City View Center initially planned to build at the Steelyard Commons location, but the $1.5 million higher cost led to choosing the former Boyas Dump site instead. As a result, City View Center was developed in Cleveland alongside Steelyard Commons.

In 2008, Walmart at City View Center announced its closure and merged with the Steelyard Commons and Bedford Walmart, the latter of which has since closed. Additionally, in 2006, Home Depot decided to move to Steelyard Commons instead of City View Center. The Steelyard Commons location for Home Depot was originally intended for Big Lots and TJ Maxx, but Home Depot secured the spot before them.
