= Fairview Park, Ohio =

- City
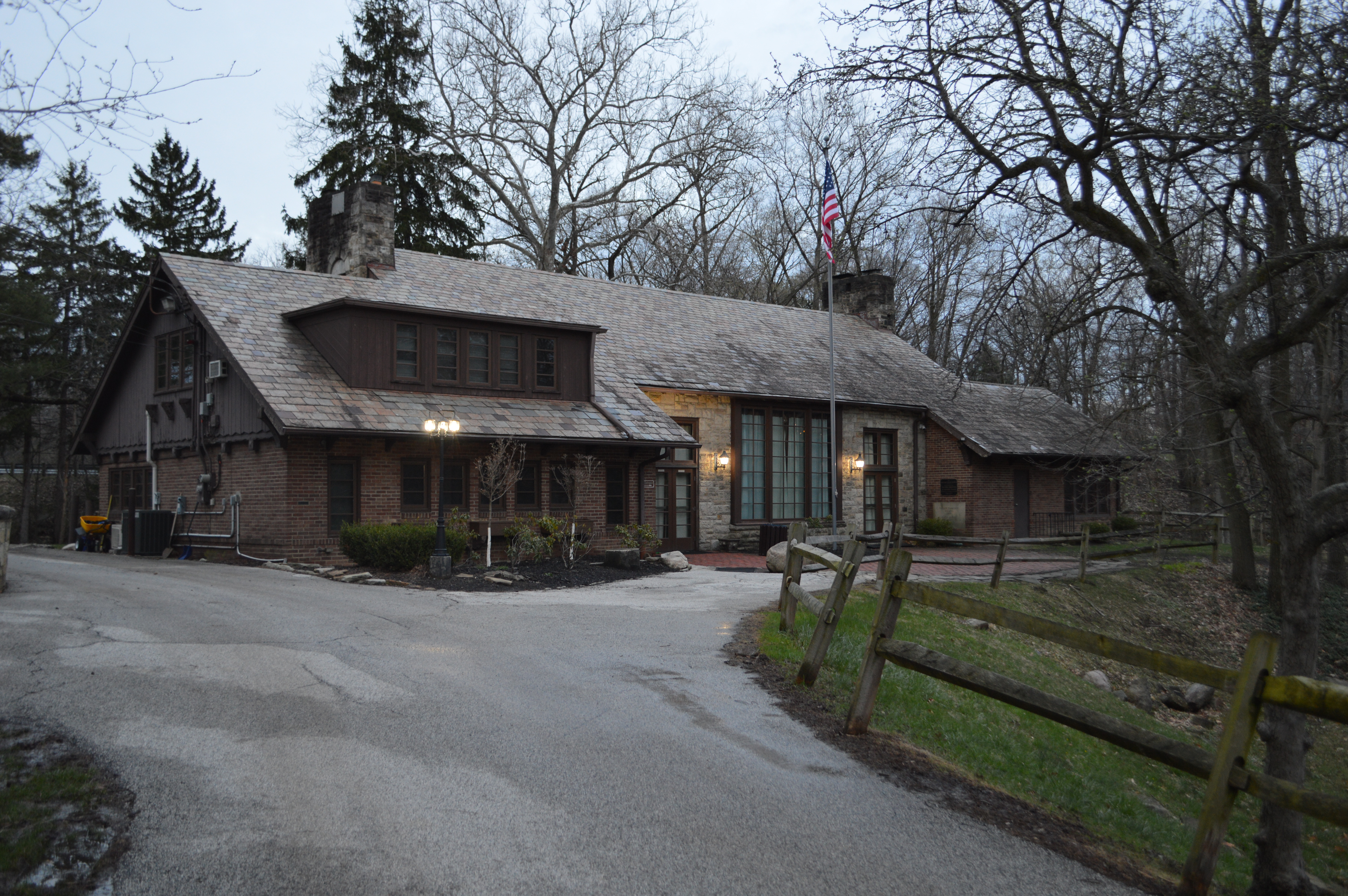
- Bain Cabin in Bain Park
- Motto: "A Great Place To Grow"
- Interactive map of Fairview Park, Ohio
- Location within Ohio Location within the United States
- Coordinates: 41°26′30″N 081°51′27″W
- Country: United States
- State: Ohio
- County: Cuyahoga

Government
  - Type: Mayor-council
  - Mayor: Bill Schneider (D)

Area
  - Total: 4.69 sq mi (12.15 km^{2})
  - Land: 4.69 sq mi (12.15 km^{2})
  - Water: 0 sq mi (0.00 km^{2})
- Elevation: 745 ft (227 m)

Population (2020)
  - Total: 17,291
  - Estimate (2023): 16,785
  - Density: 3,687.3/sq mi (1,423.66/km^{2})
- Time zone: UTC-5 (Eastern (EST))
  - Summer (DST): UTC-4 (EDT)
- ZIP code: 44126
- Area code: 440
- FIPS code: 39-26446
- GNIS feature ID: 1072213
- Website: www.fairviewparkohio.gov

Fairview Park is a city in Cuyahoga County, Ohio, United States. The population was 17,291 at the 2020 census. A suburb of Cleveland, it is a part of the Cleveland metropolitan area.

== History ==
Fairview Park was originally part of Rockport Township, later the Rocky River hamlet. The hamlet was incorporated as a village in 1903 and was split in 1910, with the northern part of the region becoming Rocky River and the southern part assuming the name Goldwood. Part of the Goldwood Township was later annexed to Rocky River and Goldwood would subsequently be incorporated as a separate village. Afterwards, Goldwood was split into two regions. A large portion of the land to the north became the Village of Fairview (later Fairview Village). Meanwhile, the remaining land located in the southwest corner and land along Center Ridge Road remained as Goldwood and was later incorporated as a village. By 1925, the remaining Goldwood region was renamed Parkview.

Both Fairview Village and Parkview remained small suburbs of its neighboring Cleveland (which had annexed most of what was West Park in 1923). In 1929, an economic recession in Fairview led to consideration of annexation to Cleveland. However, the plan never went to the ballot and Fairview maintained its independence. In 1948, Fairview became Fairview Park. Much of the growth of this region did not take place until after World War II. Most notably, the village began attracting former Cleveland residents when Fairview Shopping Center opened in 1947 on Lorain Road. In 1950, the village's size exceeded 5,000 at 9,234 and became the City of Fairview Park. The first city charter was adopted in November 1958. The remaining Parkview region was later annexed to Fairview in 1967.

== Geography ==
According to the United States Census Bureau, the city has a total area of 4.68 square miles (12.12 km^{2}), all land.

== Demographics ==
Historical population
Census	Pop.	Note	%±
1920	642		—
1930	3,689		474.6%
1940	4,700		27.4%
1950	9,311		98.1%
1960	14,624		57.1%
1970	21,681		48.3%
1980	19,283		−11.1%
1990	18,028		−6.5%
2000	17,572		−2.5%
2010	16,826		−4.2%
2020	17,291		2.8%
2023 (est.)	16,785		−2.9%

=== Racial and ethnic composition ===
Fairview Park city, Ohio – Racial and ethnic composition Note: the US Census treats Hispanic/Latino as an ethnic category. This table excludes Latinos from the racial categories and assigns them to a separate category. Hispanics/Latinos may be of any race.
Race / Ethnicity (NH = Non-Hispanic)	Pop 2000	Pop 2010	Pop 2020	% 2000	% 2010	% 2020
White alone (NH)	16,672	15,512	15,138	94.88%	92.19%	87.55%
Black or African American alone (NH)	111	292	446	0.63%	1.74%	2.58%
Native American or Alaska Native alone (NH)	15	12	14	0.09%	0.07%	0.08%
Asian alone (NH)	274	267	280	1.56%	1.59%	1.62%
Native Hawaiian or Pacific Islander alone (NH)	4	1	5	0.02%	0.01%	0.03%
Other race alone (NH)	10	12	74	0.06%	0.07%	0.43%
Mixed race or Multiracial (NH)	222	173	603	1.26%	1.03%	3.49%
Hispanic or Latino (any race)	264	557	731	1.50%	3.31%	4.23%
Total	17,572	16,826	17,291	100.00%	100.00%	100.00%

=== 2020 census ===
As of the 2020 census, Fairview Park had a population of 17,291 and a median age of 42.7 years; 19.1% of residents were under the age of 18 and 20.3% were 65 years of age or older. For every 100 females there were 92.5 males, and for every 100 females age 18 and over there were 90.0 males age 18 and over.

100.0% of residents lived in urban areas, while 0.0% lived in rural areas.

There were 7,852 households in Fairview Park, of which 23.1% had children under the age of 18 living in them; 43.5% were married-couple households, 20.4% were households with a male householder and no spouse or partner present, and 29.6% were households with a female householder and no spouse or partner present. About 36.7% of all households were made up of individuals and 15.8% had someone living alone who was 65 years of age or older.

There were 8,197 housing units, of which 4.2% were vacant. The homeowner vacancy rate was 1.2% and the rental vacancy rate was 5.5%.

Racial composition as of the 2020 census
Race	Number	Percent
White	15,326	88.6%
Black or African American	473	2.7%
American Indian and Alaska Native	23	0.1%
Asian	281	1.6%
Native Hawaiian and Other Pacific Islander	5	0.0%
Some other race	258	1.5%
Two or more races	925	5.3%
Hispanic or Latino (of any race)	731	4.2%

=== 2010 census ===
At the census of 2010, there were 16,826 people, 7,564 households, and 4,461 families residing in the city. The population density was 3,595.3 inhabitants per square mile (1,388.2/km^{2}). There were 8,109 housing units at an average density of 1,732.7 per square mile (669.0/km^{2}). The racial makeup of the city was 94.4% White, 1.8% Black, 0.1% Native American, 1.6% Asian, 0.8% from other races, and 1.2% from two or more races. Hispanic or Latino of any race were 3.3% of the population.

Of the city's population over the age of 25, 38.0% hold a bachelor's degree or higher.

There were 7,564 households, of which 26.2% had children under the age of 18 living with them, 46.3% were married couples living together, 9.5% had a female householder with no husband present, 3.2% had a male householder with no wife present, and 41.0% were non-families. 35.7% of all households were made up of individuals, and 13.8% had someone living alone who was 65 years of age or older. The average household size was 2.22 and the average family size was 2.93.

The median age in the city was 42.3 years. 21.1% of residents were under the age of 18; 6.3% were between the ages of 18 and 24; 26% were from 25 to 44; 29.8% were from 45 to 64; and 16.8% were 65 years of age or older. The gender makeup of the city was 47.9% male and 52.1% female.

=== 2000 census ===
At the 2000 census, there were 17,572 people, 7,856 households and 4,713 families residing in the city. The population density was 3,742.2 inhabitants per square mile (1,444.9/km^{2}). There were 8,152 housing units at an average density of 1,736.1 per square mile (670.3/km^{2}). The racial makeup of the city was 95.97% White, 0.64% Black, 0.10% Native American, 1.57% Asian, 0.02% Pacific Islander, 0.36% from other races, and 1.33% from two or more races. Hispanic or Latino of any race were 1.50% of the population. Ancestries include German (29.7%), Irish (26.7%), English (10.7%), Polish (8.9%), Italian (8.8%), and Slovak (5.6%).

There were 7,856 households, of which 25.7% had children under the age of 18 living with them, 48.6% were married couples living together, 8.7% had a female householder with no husband present, and 40.0% were non-families. 36.0% of all households were made up of individuals, and 15.2% had someone living alone who was 65 years of age or older. The average household size was 2.24 and the average family size was 2.96.

22.2% of the population were under the age of 18, 5.7% from 18 to 24, 29.1% from 25 to 44, 23.8% from 45 to 64, and 19.1% who were 65 years of age or older. The median age was 41 years. For every 100 females, there were 88.7 males. For every 100 females age 18 and over, there were 84.5 males.

The median household income was $50,487 and the median family income was $62,803. Males had a median income of $45,318 compared with $33,565 for females. The per capita income for the city was $27,662. About 2.4% of families and 4.1% of the population were below the poverty line, including 4.6% of those under age 18 and 3.6% of those age 65 or over.

== Economy ==
The city of Fairview Park contains two large shopping centers, Westgate Mall and Fairview Center.

== Education ==
=== Primary and Secondary Schools ===
There are 4 public schools in Fairview Park.

- Fairview High School
- Lewis F. Mayer Middle School
- Gilles-Sweet Elementary School
- Parkview Early Education Center

=== Library ===
Fairview Park is home to the Fairview Park Branch of the Cuyahoga County Public Library.

== Notable people ==
- Tom Cousineau, NFL football player
- Mary Bridget Davies, singer and actress
- Matthew Glave, actor
- Alexandra Grant, visual artist
- Matt Kata, baseball infielder
- Paul Ramon Matia, United States District Court Judge
- Terrence McDonnell, television writer and producer
- Jamie Mueller, NFL football player
- John Jude Palencar, illustrator
- Sally Priesand, first female rabbi ordained in the United States
- M. Frank Rudy, aeronautical engineer and inventor
- Sandy Satullo II, racing driver
- Dan Sullivan, U.S. senator for Alaska
