= Great Northern Mall (Ohio) =

- Location: North Olmsted, Ohio, United States
- Coordinates: 41°25′02″N 81°54′20″W
- Address: 4954 Great Northern Mall
- Opened: 1976
- Developer: Biskind Development Company
- Manager: Pacific Retail Capital Partners
- Owner: Starwood Capital Group
- Num. of stores: 120
- Num. of anchor tenants: 6 (5 open, 1 under development)
- Floor area: 1,180,000 sq ft (110,000 m^{2})
- Floors: 1 (2 in JCPenney, Dick's Sporting Goods, and former Sears, 3 in Dillard's and Macy's)
- Parking: Uncovered, lit parking lot
- Public transit: RTA: 55
- Website: greatnorthernohio.com

Great Northern Mall is a single-level enclosed shopping mall in North Olmsted, Ohio, a suburb of Cleveland. The mall features Dick's Sporting Goods, Dillard's, JCPenney, Macy's, and a 10-screen movie theater as its anchor stores. The mall has one vacant anchor space formerly occupied by Sears; which closed in 2020. The former Sears is currently under development to become a Meijer grocery store.

== History ==
=== Early concepts: 1958-1965 ===
Originally, a small outdoor shopping center called the Great Northern Shopping Center was opened by Saul Biskind, Sol Shur, and Sidney Shurin 1958 on what was a field of strawberries. The plaza contained a Sears (west end), F. W. Woolworth Company (center west), and a Pick-N-Pay grocery store (east end), along with a small-scale J. C. Penney and other stores. A freestanding May Company Cleveland store was built to the east of the original plaza in 1965.

=== Enclosed mall opening and early years: 1976- 1999 ===
The enclosed mall was opened in 1976 and attached to the east end of the existing May Company building. It featured new, larger JCPenney and Sears stores. In 1980, Hexalon Real Estate—an affiliate of what is now Unibail-Rodamco—became an investor in the mall. The 1980s saw the opening of the Plaza South attached to the original strip (now renamed the Plaza) and the 1987 addition of the South Court to the mall. Additionally, 2 mid-level hotels and several office facilities, such as Corporate Center and Technology Park, were built proximal to the retail facilities. These served to feed customers into the Mall and Plazas, as did the strategic location near Lorain Road, Brookpark Road, Great Northern Boulevard, and Interstate 480.

In 1991, Hexalon bought out the remaining Biskind stake in the mall and undertook a significant upgrade and remodel in 1992. It hired The Edward J. DeBartolo Corporation as its management company until 2000, when Rodamco's Urban Shopping Centers assumed management. The Biskind family, which had retained the Plazas, eventually sold them to DDR Corp. in 1997.

=== Westfield Group acquisition: 2000-2013 ===
May Company Cleveland was renamed Kaufmann's in 1993, and became Macy's in 2006. The Westfield Group acquired the shopping center in early 2002, and renamed it "Westfield Shoppingtown Great Northern." Dillard's was added on March 19, 2003, expanding the South Court into a full-fledged new wing. Westfield dropped "Shoppingtown" from the mall's name in June 2005, around the time that a newly built 84,000-square-foot (7,800-square-meter) Dick's Sporting Goods (originally planned to be Galyan's) opened.

The original food court, which had been located between Sears and JCPenney, was moved adjacent to Dick's Sporting Goods in 2011. In March 2013, construction began at the site of the original food court for a 10-screen Regal Entertainment Group movie theater, three new restaurants, and extra renovations; this addition was completed by December of that year. The mall was sold to Starwood Retail Partners, a subsidiary of Starwood Capital Group, in the midst of construction.

=== Pacific Retail management and Sears closure: 2020-present ===
On June 1, 2020, it was announced that Sears would be closing as part of a plan to close 28 stores nationwide. The store closed August 16, 2020. This was the last full-line Sears store in Ohio. The mall became managed by Pacific Retail Capital Partners in 2020.

In 2026, plans began to redevelop the former Sears into a grocery store. Meijer, a hypermarket chain, has been in talks of opening a store at the mall on the site of the former Sears. The Meijer would anchor the mall. Currently, developments are ongoing.
