= Greater Cleveland Regional Transit Authority =

Public transit agency for the Cleveland, Ohio, area

Regional Transit Authority

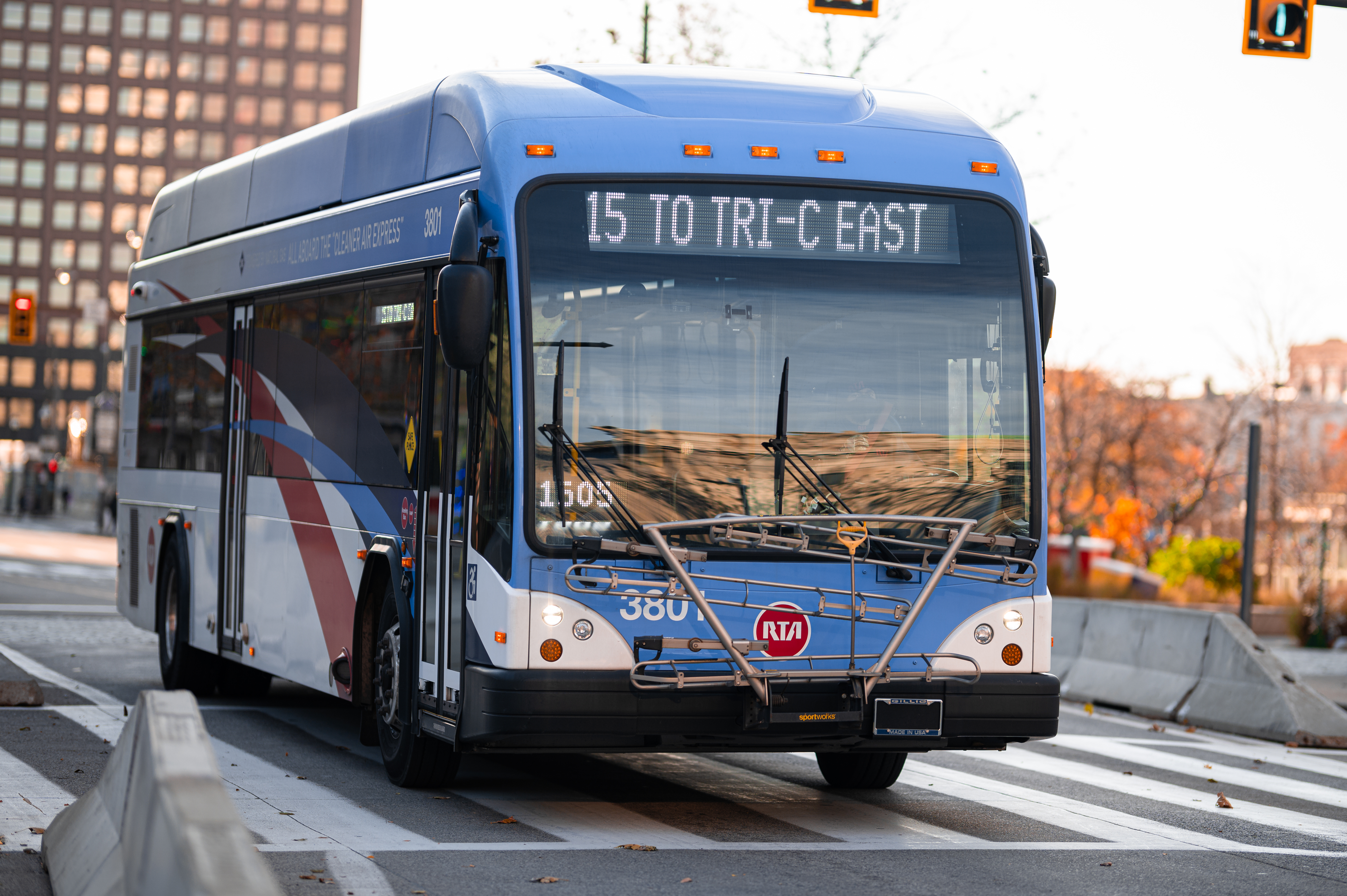
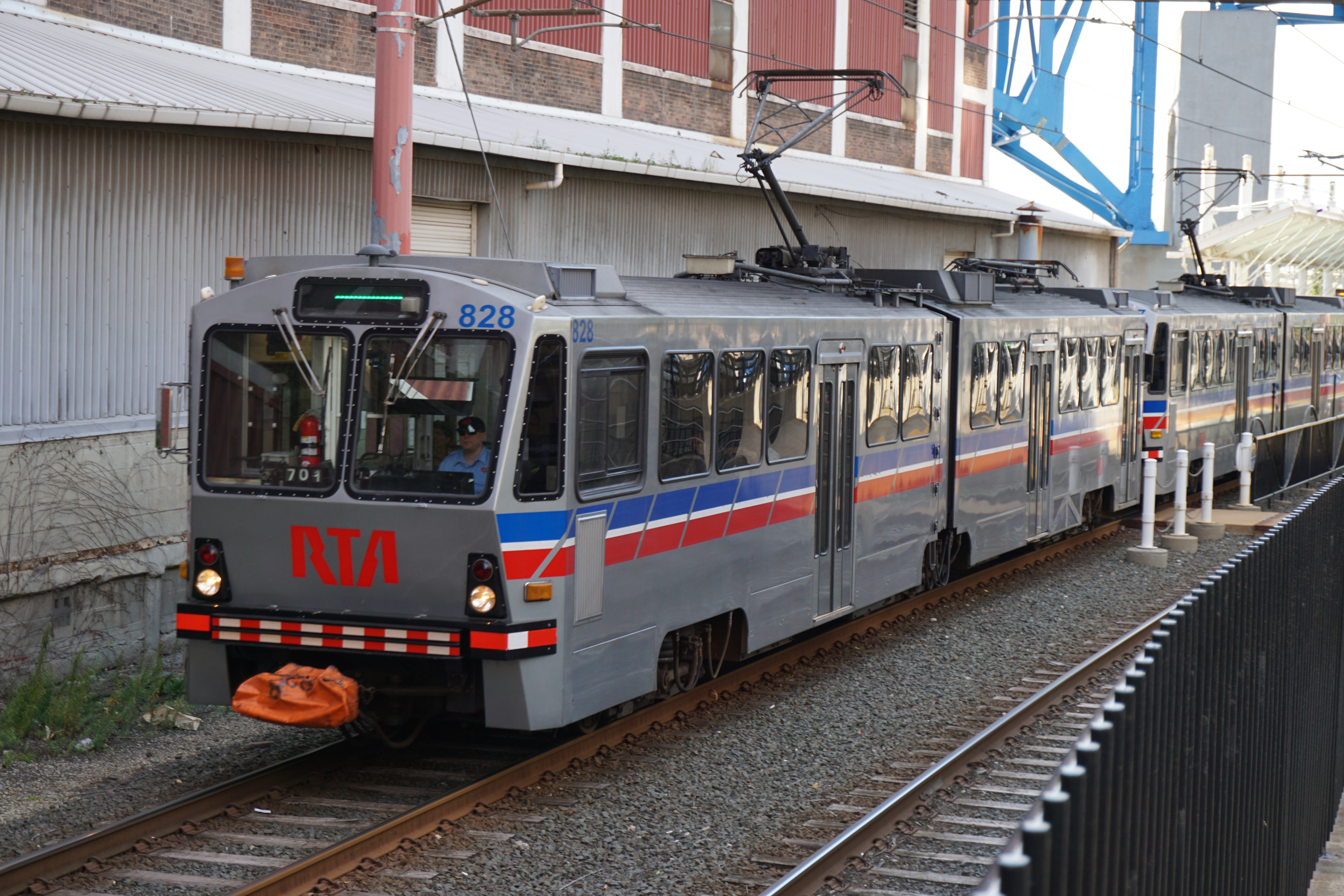
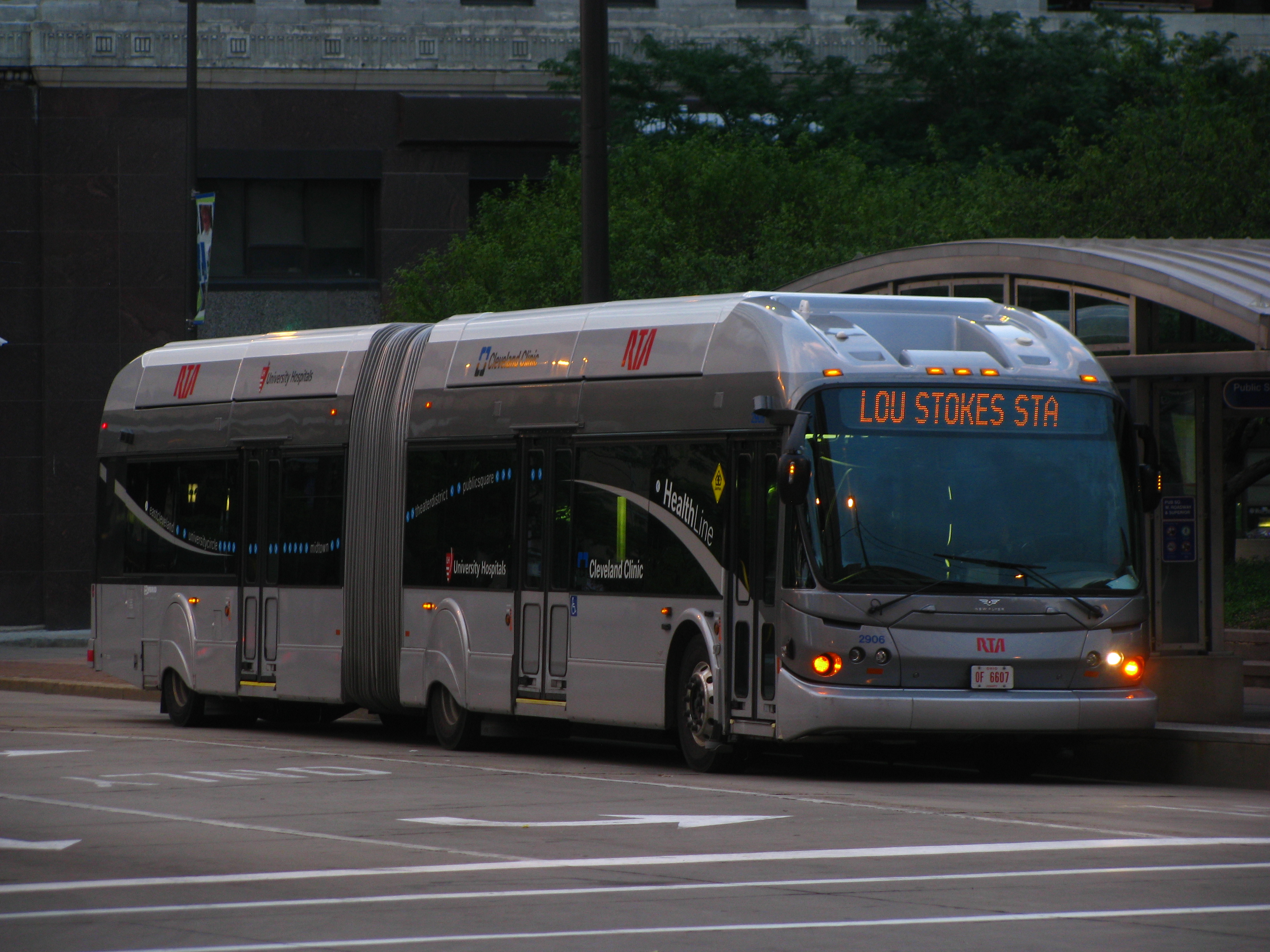
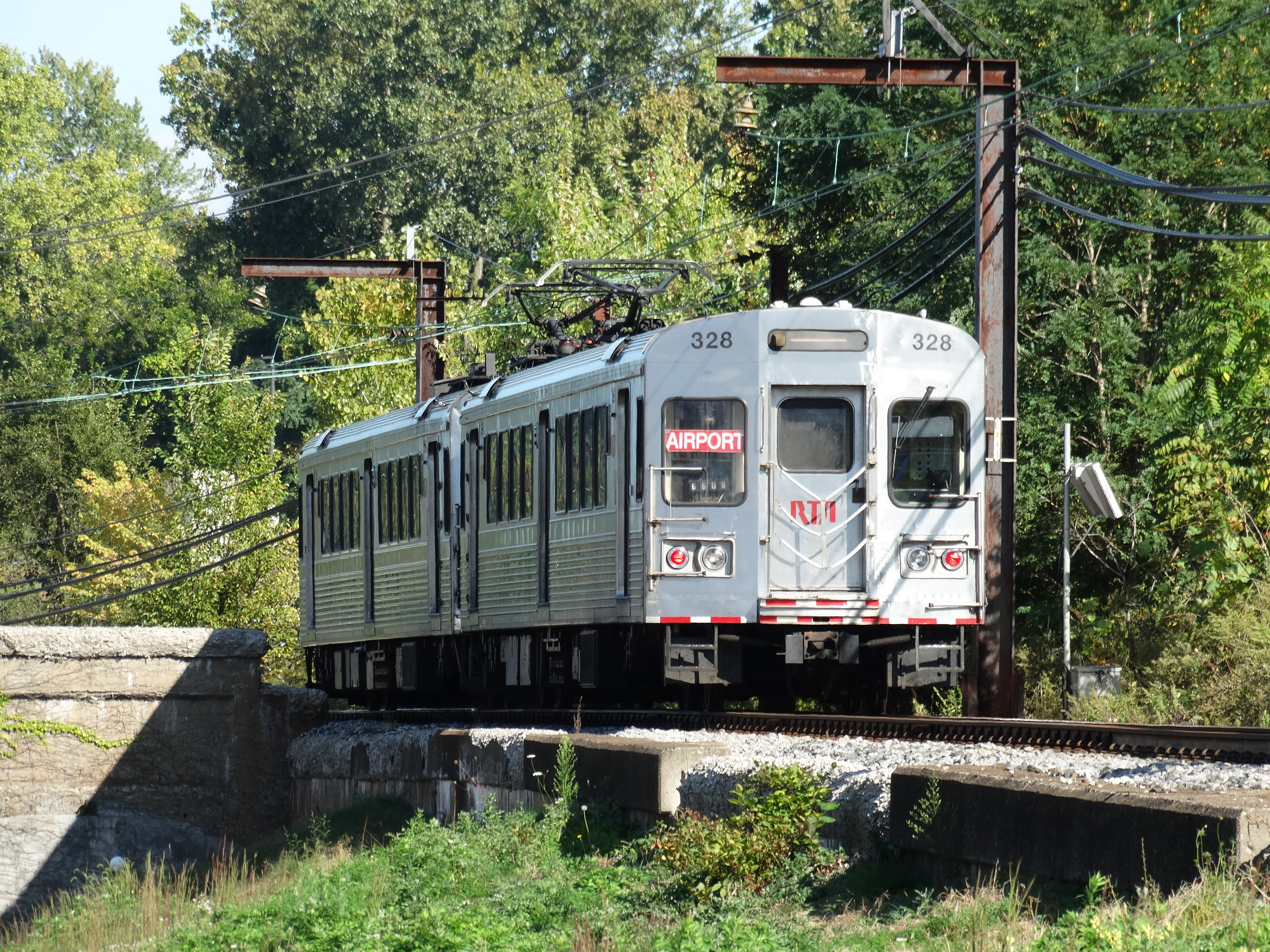
- RTA services, top left to bottom right: local bus, Blue & Green Line light rail, bus rapid transit, and Red Line subway
- Founded: December 30, 1974
- Headquarters: 1240 West 6th Street, Cleveland, Ohio, U.S.
- Locale: Cleveland
- Service type: Bus and Rapid Transit
- Routes: Bus: 37, Rail: 4, BRT: 3
- Fleet: Bus: 391, Rail: 92, Trolley: 12, BRT: 40
- Daily ridership: 79,600 (weekdays, Q1 2026)
- Annual ridership: 24,519,200 (2025)
- Chief executive: India Birdsong Terry
- Website: riderta.com

The Greater Cleveland Regional Transit Authority (officially the GCRTA, but historically and locally referred to as the RTA) is the public transit agency for Cleveland and the surrounding suburbs of Cuyahoga County, Ohio, United States. RTA is the largest transit agency in Ohio, with a ridership of 24,519,200, or about 79,600 per weekday as of the first quarter of 2026.

RTA owns and operates the RTA Rapid Transit rail system (called "The Rapid" by area residents), which consists of one heavy rail line (the Red Line) and three light rail lines (Blue, Green, Waterfront). The bulk of RTA's service consists of buses, including regular routes, express or flyer buses, loop, and paratransit buses. In December 2004, RTA adopted a revised master plan, Transit 2025, in which several rail extensions, bus line improvements and transit oriented developments were discussed.

RTA's major predecessor, the Cleveland Transit System, was the first transit system in the western hemisphere to provide direct rapid transit service from a city's downtown to its major airport.

In 2007, RTA was named the best public transit system in North America by the American Public Transportation Association, for "demonstrating achievement in efficiency and effectiveness."

== History ==
The GCRTA was established on December 30, 1974, and on September 5, 1975, assumed control of the Cleveland Transit System, which operated the heavy rail line from Windermere to Cleveland Hopkins Airport and the local bus systems, and of Shaker Heights Rapid Transit, the descendant of a separate streetcar system formed by the Van Sweringen brothers to serve their Shaker Heights development, which operated the two interurban light rail lines from downtown to Shaker Heights. CTS had been formed in 1942, when the city of Cleveland took over the old Cleveland Railway Company. However, with Cleveland's dwindling population over the previous two decades, CTS' revenue dwindled significantly, leading to a 17-day strike in July 1970. City and county leaders concluded that a regional approach was the only way to save the system.

A month after its formation, RTA assumed control over the suburban bus systems operated by Maple Heights, North Olmsted, Brecksville, Garfield Heights and Euclid.

The RTA had to undertake a number of renovations to the rail system, as the Shaker Heights lines (renamed the Blue and Green lines) had not been significantly renovated since their creation in 1920. They were largely rebuilt by 1981 and the downtown station at Cleveland Union Terminal, later renamed Tower City Center, was heavily rebuilt by 1987. In 1994, a walkway and skyway was added from the Tower City station to the Gateway Sports and Entertainment Complex and the Blue and Green lines were extended to the North Coast Harbor area by 1996.

Seventy-five Cleveland Transit System PCC streetcars were sold in 1952 to Toronto to be used by the Toronto Transit Commission (TTC). The last of the Cleveland PCC models operated for 30 years in Toronto, until 1982. Cleveland Transit also sold eight Marmon-Herrington TC44 trolleybuses in 1963 to the TTC.

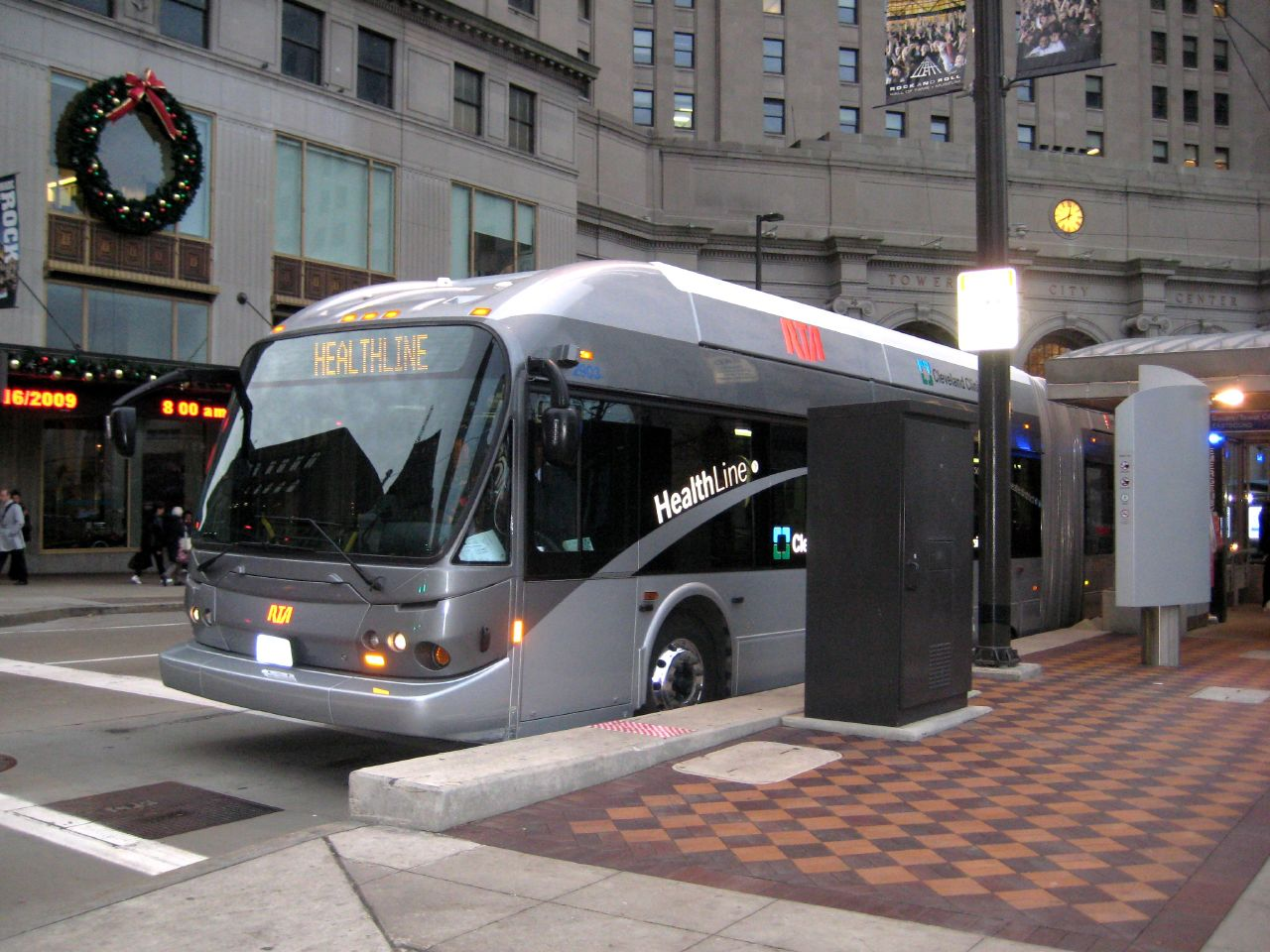
A HealthLine rapid transit bus, a New Flyer DE60LFA, at Public Square

In 2005, RTA began building a bus rapid transit line along Euclid Avenue from Public Square to University Circle and then to East Cleveland. This was originally to be a subway line running under Euclid Avenue, but the high cost of such a project caused it to be reduced in scope, resulting in the current bus rapid transit project. Vehicles operate in an exclusive center median busway from Public Square to Stokes Blvd. and transition to curbside running through University Circle to the Windermere Rapid Transit Station in East Cleveland. The vehicles are low-floor, articulated 63 feet (19 m) buses.

Naming rights for the line were purchased by the Cleveland Clinic and University Hospitals for twenty-five years. The BRT route, originally named the "Silver Line", which serves the two major health industry employers in Cleveland, is named the HealthLine.

As sections were completed, they were opened to traffic; the entire stretch within the project area was open by October 24, 2008 as part of its grand opening October 24–26, 2008.

In January 2023, the GCRTA announced the acquisition of sixty Siemens S200 light rail vehicles to replace the system's entire existing rail fleet. Twenty-four such cars will replace the Tokyu heavy rail trains used on the Red Line, with an option to acquire 36 additional units to replace the Breda light rail vehicles used on the Blue, Green, and Waterfront lines. GCRTA's S200s will include steps at the front right door for boarding at street-level stations on the Blue, Green, and Waterfront. The new light rail vehicles will arrive in Cleveland in September 2026, with service expected to begin on the Red Line in Summer 2027. Service on the Blue and Green Lines are projected to start in Summer 2028.

=== Active Bus Fleet ===
Image	Manufacturer	Model	Length	Year	Fleet numbers
	MCI	D4500CT	45 ft (14 m)	2020	1901-1909
	New Flyer	XD60	60 ft (18 m)	2013	3201-3216
	New Flyer	XD60	60 ft (18 m)	2014	3251-3257
	Gillig	BRT Plus CNG	40 ft (12 m)	2013	3301-3322
	Gillig	BRT Plus CNG	40 ft (12 m)	2014	3323-3345
	Gillig	BRT Plus CNG	40 ft (12 m)	2015	3346-3390
	Gillig	BRT Plus CNG	40 ft (12 m)	2016	3401-3416
	Gillig	BRT Plus CNG	40 ft (12 m)	2017	3601-3633
	Gillig	BRT Plus CNG	40 ft (12 m)	2019	3801-3806
	Gillig	BRT Plus CNG	40 ft (12 m)	2020	3851-3869
	Gillig	BRT Plus CNG	40 ft (12 m)	2021	3901-3920
	Gillig	BRT Plus CNG	40 ft (12 m)	2023	4101-4120
	Gillig	BRT Plus CNG	40 ft (12 m)	2025-2026	4200s
	Gillig	BRT Plus Diesel	40 ft (12 m)	2017	3501-3520
	Gillig	BRT Plus Diesel	40 ft (12 m)	2018	3551-3559
	Gillig	BRT Plus Diesel	40 ft (12 m)	2022	4001-4020
	Gillig	Low Floor Trolley Replica	40 ft (12 m)	2015	3701-3703
	Gillig	Low Floor Trolley Replica	40 ft (12 m)	2016	3704-3712
	New Flyer	XN60	60 ft (18 m)	2021	6001-6016

== List of bus routes ==
In 2025, the GCRTA bus system had a ridership of 20,169,700, or about 59,300 per weekday as of the first quarter of 2026.

= 15-minute midday frequency
= 30-minute midday frequency
= 45-minute midday frequency
= 60-minute or less midday frequency
Other colors denote special routes

Route Name	Terminal 1	Terminal 2	via	notes
1 St. Clair	Downtown; Superior Avenue and West 6th Street	South Collinwood; East 153rd Street Loop	Saint Clair Avenue	24-hour service
2 East 79	Glenville; Maud Loop	Tremont; Steelyard Commons	Harvard Avenue, East 79th Street	Weekdays only
3 Superior	Downtown; Superior Avenue & West 6th Street	East Cleveland; Stokes-Windermere Station	Superior Avenue (US-6)	24-hour service
HealthLine	Downtown; Public Square	East Cleveland; Stokes-Windermere Station	Euclid Avenue (US-20)	24-hour service
7 Monticello	East Cleveland; Stokes-Windermere Station	Richmond Heights; Richmond Park Drive North	Monticello Boulevard	
7A Monticello	East Cleveland; Stokes-Windermere Station	Mayfield Heights; SOM Center Road and Mayfield Road	Monticello Boulevard/Wilson Mills Road	Weekdays only
8 Cedar-Buckeye	Downtown; East 6th Street and Lakeside Avenue	Buckeye-Shaker; Shaker Square	Cedar Avenue, Buckeye Road	
9 Mayfield-Hough	Downtown; West Prospect Avenue and West 3rd Street	Mayfield Heights; SOM Center Road and Mayfield Road	Payne Avenue, Hough Avenue, Mayfield Road, Severance Town Center	
10 East 105-Lakeshore	South Broadway; Turney-Ella Loop	Willowick; Shoregate Town Center	East 93rd Street, East 105th Street, Lake Shore Boulevard	
10 East 105-Lakeshore	South Broadway; Turney-Ella Loop	Euclid; Euclid Hospital (East 189th Street)	East 93rd Street, East 105th Street, Lake Shore Boulevard	Overnight and alternate daytime trips
11 Quincy-Cedar	Downtown; West Prospect Avenue and West 3rd Street	Beachwood; Montifiore Hospital	Community College Avenue (Quincy Avenue), Cedar Road	
14 Kinsman	Downtown; West 6th Street and West Prospect Avenue	Pepper Pike; Lander Circle	Chagrin Boulevard/Kinsman Road	
14 Kinsman	Downtown; West 6th Street and West Prospect Avenue	Shaker Heights; Warrensville-Van Aken station	Chagrin Boulevard/Kinsman Road	Overnight trips
14A Kinsman	Downtown; West 6th Street and West Prospect Avenue	Warrensville Heights; Country Lane	Emery Road, Chagrin Boulevard/Kinsman Road	
15 Union-Harvard	Downtown; West 6th Street and West Prospect Avenue	Highland Hills; Tri-C Eastern Campus	Broadway, Union Avenue, Harvard Avenue	
16 East 55	Tremont; Steelyard Commons	Saint Clair-Superior; Horizon Science Academy Cleveland	East 55th Street	Weekdays only
18 West 98-Garfield	Edgewater; West Boulevard-Cudell station	Garfield Heights; Marymount Hospital	Garfield Boulevard, Harvard Avenue, West 98th Street	
19 Broadway	Downtown; East 6th Street and Lakeside Avenue	Highland Hills; Tri-C Eastern Campus	All trips: Broadway Avenue, then: 19, 19B: Miles Road; 19A: Turney Road	
19 Broadway	Downtown; East 6th Street and Lakeside Avenue	Corlett; Caine-East 131st Loop	All trips: Broadway Avenue, then: 19, 19B: Miles Road; 19A: Turney Road	Overnight trips
19A Broadway	Downtown; East 6th Street and Lakeside Avenue	Maple Heights; Southgate Transit Center	All trips: Broadway Avenue, then: 19, 19B: Miles Road; 19A: Turney Road	
19B Broadway	Downtown; East 6th Street and Lakeside Avenue	Highland Hills; Tri-C Eastern Campus	All trips: Broadway Avenue, then: 19, 19B: Miles Road; 19A: Turney Road	Rush hour trips via Fargo Ave
22 Lorain	Downtown; Rockwell Avenue and East 3rd Street	Fairview Park; Westgate Transit Center	Lorain Avenue	24-hour service Alternate weekend trips run east of West Park station
25 Madison-Clark	Downtown; Rockwell Avenue and East 3rd Street	Fairview Park; Westgate Transit Center	Clark Avenue, Madison Avenue	Serves Lakeview Terrace weekday daytime
25 Madison-Clark	Downtown; Rockwell Avenue and East 3rd Street	Edgewater; West 117th-Madison station	Clark Avenue, Madison Avenue	Overnight trips
26 Detroit	Downtown; Rockwell Avenue and East 3rd Street	Fairview Park; Westgate Transit Center	Detroit Avenue	Overnight trips
26 Detroit	Downtown; Rockwell Avenue and East 3rd Street	Westlake; Crocker Park	Detroit Avenue, Center Ridge Road	Weekend and other weekday trips
26 Detroit	Downtown; Rockwell Avenue and East 3rd Street	Westlake; Tri-C Westshore Campus	Detroit Avenue, Center Ridge Road	Every 3rd weekday trip
26A Detroit	Downtown; Rockwell Avenue and East 3rd Street	Westlake; Tri-C Westshore Campus	Detroit Avenue, Detroit Road	Weekday trips
26A Detroit	Downtown; Rockwell Avenue and East 3rd Street	Westlake; Crocker Park	Detroit Avenue, Detroit Road	Weekend and late weekday evening trips
28 Euclid	East Cleveland; Stokes-Windermere Station	Euclid; Tungsten	Euclid Avenue	24-hour service
28A Euclid	East Cleveland; Stokes-Windermere Station	Euclid; Shore Center Plaza	Euclid Avenue, East 222nd Street	
31 St. Clair-Babbitt	East Cleveland; Stokes-Windermere Station	Euclid; Shore Center Plaza	Hayden Avenue, Saint Clair Avenue, Babbitt Road	Limited trips serve Euclid Amazon Center
34 East 200-Green	Euclid; Shore Center Plaza	Highland Hills; Tri-C Eastern Campus	East 200th Street, Green Road, Richmond Road	Weekdays only
35 Lee Blvd-East 123	East Cleveland; East 129th Street Loop	Cleveland Heights; Severance Town Center	East 123rd Street, Euclid Avenue, Lee Boulevard, Mayfield Road	Weekdays only
37 Hayden-East 185	East Cleveland; Stokes-Windermere Station	Euclid; Shore Center Plaza	Hayden Avenue, East 152nd Street, East 185th Street, Lake Shore Boulevard	
39 Lakeshore	Downtown; West Prospect Avenue and West 3rd Street	Willowick; Shoregate Town Center	Cleveland Memorial Shoreway, Lake Shore Boulevard	Rush hour trips
40 Lakeview-Lee	Forest Hills; Taft Avenue and Eddy Road	Maple Heights; Southgate Transit Center	Lakeview Road, Superior Road, Lee Road	
41 Warrensville	East Cleveland; Stokes-Windermere Station	Maple Heights; Southgate Transit Center	Noble Road/Warrensville Center Road	Overnight and select or alternate trips
41 Warrensville	East Cleveland; Stokes-Windermere Station	Glenwillow; Diamond Parkway	Noble Road/Warrensville Center Road, Columbus Road, Aurora Road, Cochran Road	
41F Warrensville	East Cleveland; Stokes-Windermere Station	Glenwillow; Diamond Parkway	Noble Road/Warrensville Center Road, Harvard Road, US-422, Cochran Road	Reverse rush hour peak direction trips
45 Ridge-Fulton	Downtown; Rockwell Avenue and East 3rd Street	Parma; Parma Transit Center	Fulton Road, Ridge Road	
48 East 131	University Circle; East 93rd Street and Chester Avenue	Garfield Heights; Marymount Hospital	East 131st Street	24-hour service
50 East 116	University Circle; East 93rd Street and Chester Avenue	Lee-Miles; East 177th Street and South Miles Road	East 116th Street	
51 MetroHealth Line-West 25th	Downtown; Rockwell Avenue and East 3rd Street	Parma; Parma Transit Center	West 25th Street, Pearl Road	Weekday daytime trips serve Tri-C Western Campus
51A MetroHealth Line-West 25th	Downtown; Rockwell Avenue and East 3rd Street	Parma; Parma Transit Center	West 25th Street, State Road	
51A MetroHealth Line-West 25th	Downtown; Rockwell Avenue and East 3rd Street	Old Brooklyn; West 33rd Loop	West 25th Street, State Road	Overnight trips
53 MetroHealth Line-Broadview	Downtown; Public Square	Brecksville; Brecksville MetroHealth Center	I-90/71, Broadview Road, Royalton Road	
53A MetroHealth Line-Broadview	Downtown; Public Square	North Royalton; North Royalton Loop	I-90/71, Broadview Road, Royalton Road	Weekday rush hour trips
54 Brookpark-Rockside	Garfield Heights; Garfield Commons	Brook Park; Brookpark Station	Rockside Road, Brookpark Road	
55 Clifton	Downtown; Public Square	North Olmsted; Industrial Parkway Loop	All trips: Clifton Boulevard, Cleveland Memorial Shoreway, then: 55: Lorain Road; 55B: Lake Road; 55C: Detroit Road	Weekend trips that also stop at Edgewater Park
55 Clifton	Downtown; Stephanie Tubbs Jones Transit Center	North Olmsted; Industrial Parkway Loop	All trips: Clifton Boulevard, Cleveland Memorial Shoreway, then: 55: Lorain Road; 55B: Lake Road; 55C: Detroit Road	Weekday trips (Rush hour trips serve North Olmsted Park and Ride)
55B Clifton	Downtown; Stephanie Tubbs Jones Transit Center	Bay Village; Cahoon Park	All trips: Clifton Boulevard, Cleveland Memorial Shoreway, then: 55: Lorain Road; 55B: Lake Road; 55C: Detroit Road	Weekday rush hour peak direction trips
55C Clifton	Downtown; Stephanie Tubbs Jones Transit Center	Westlake; Crocker Park	All trips: Clifton Boulevard, Cleveland Memorial Shoreway, then: 55: Lorain Road; 55B: Lake Road; 55C: Detroit Road	Weekday rush hour peak direction trips
71 Pearl-Tiedeman	Downtown; East 3rd Street and Rockwell Avenue	Strongsville; Howe Road and Drake Road	West 65th Street, Tiedeman Road, Pearl Road	
77 Brecksville	Downtown; West 3rd Street and Frankfort Avenue	Brecksville; Katherine Boulevard	Willow Freeway (I-77), Brecksville Road	
78 West 117-Puritas	Gold Coast; Winton Place	Brook Park; Brookpark Station	Grayton Road, Puritas Avenue (Bellaire Road), West 117th Street	
83 Warren-West 130	Lakewood; Lakewood Park	Parma; Parma Transit Center	Warren Road, West 140th Street, West 130th Street	
86 Rocky River Dr-Bagley	Jefferson; West Park station	Parma; Tri-C Western Campus	Lorain Avenue, Rocky River Drive, Bagley Road	
90 Broadway-Libby	Downtown; West 3rd Street and Frankfort Avenue	Oakwood; Summit County Line Loop	Willow Freeway (I-77), Granger Road (Libby Road), Northfield Road, Broadway Avenue	Alternate reverse rush hour peak direction trips run via Alexander Road
94 East 260-Richmond	Euclid; Shore Center Plaza	Highland Hills; Tri-C Eastern Campus	East 260th Street, Richmond Road	Weekday trips
94 East 260-Richmond	Euclid; Shore Center Plaza	Shaker Heights; Green Road station	East 260th Street, Richmond Road	Weekend trips
251 Strongsville Park-n-Ride	Downtown; Stephanie Tubbs Jones Transit Center	Strongsville; Strongsville Park-n-Ride	Medina Freeway (I-71)	Weekday rush hour peak direction trips
• 66R Red Line (during Red Line train shutdowns) • 67R Blue/Green Line (during Blue and Green Line train shutdowns)

=== Cleveland State Line ===
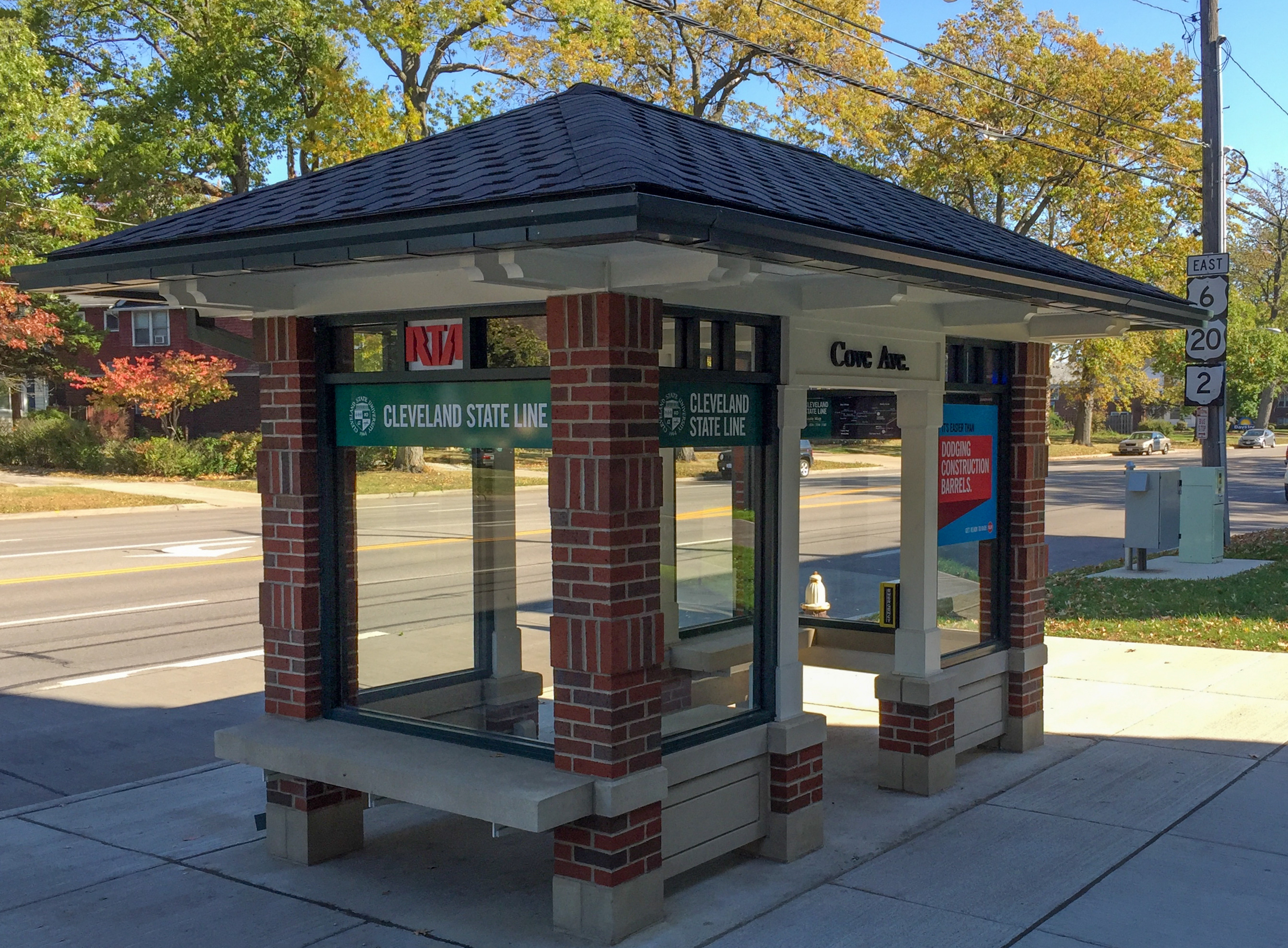
A typical station along Clifton Boulevard on The Cleveland State Line Bus rapid transit

In December 2014, RTA opened a second bus rapid transit to serve the western suburbs of Cleveland as well as a larger portion of downtown, including Cleveland State University. Cleveland State purchased naming rights to the route. The line carries a "55" designation, the same bus route number used by the BRT's predecessor.

All passengers must pay or swipe/dip their farecards on board the bus.

Only a portion of the line along Clifton Boulevard–from the western terminus of Cleveland Memorial Shoreway to Webb Road in Lakewood– includes a dedicated bus-only lane. However, the bus-only designation only applies during rush hours: with the eastbound bus-only lane active during the morning rush, and with the westbound bus-only lane active during the evening rush.

All outbound trips originate from the Stephanie Tubbs Jones Transit Center near Cleveland State and travel through downtown to Public Square before entering the west shoreway. Shortly after reaching the Lakewood border, the line divides into three sub-routes:

- 55: Travels down Clifton and continues to follow U.S. Route 20 to Detroit Road until reaching Wagar Road where it travels south to Lorain Rd in Fairview Park, continues to North Olmsted via Great Northern Mall before terminating near the Lorain County line. Rush hour trips travel into the North Olmsted park-n-ride.
- 55B: Travels down Clifton and continues to follow Lake Road into Bay Village where it follows Wolf, West Oviatt, and Osborn Roads west to Bradley Road before returning to Lake Road to travel east to its terminus at Wolf and Cahoon Roads.
- 55C: Travels down Clifton and continues to follow U.S. Route 20 to Detroit Road until reaching Crocker Road in Westlake where it terminates at Crocker Park.

The 55 base route runs 7 days a week from early A.M. though the evening. The 55B and 55C routes run Monday through Friday during the morning and evening rush hours only. B and C also travel to the Westlake Park-n-Ride.

=== MetroHealth Line ===
On September 21, 2017, RTA announced a partnership with MetroHealth to sponsor routes 51, 51A, 53 and 53A under the brand MetroHealth Line. On December 3, 2017, the rebranded MetroHealth Line began service with 20 new vehicles, fully branded with the MetroHealth logo. More than 400 bus-stop signs and 37 shelters also display the new logo along the routes. Unlike the other named lines, it features no BRT features.

== Bicycles ==
RTA has equipped all of its mainline buses with bicycle carriers. Each bus can carry two to three bicycles. Bicycles are also allowed on rapid transit trains (with a maximum limit of two per car) at all times, although operators have discretion to refuse bicycles if a train is overcrowded. Bicycles are not allowed access to/from the Public Square/Tower City Station through the shopping areas of Tower City Center. However, an elevator connection is permitted between the station lobby and street level, at Prospect Avenue via the south-side doors. Bicycles are also allowed to transfer between trains at Tower City Station. There is no additional charge for taking bicycles on RTA.

== Funding ==
When RTA was formed, Cuyahoga County voters approved a 1% county-wide sales tax, which constitutes about 70% of its operating revenue. This funding source has helped RTA maintain a higher level of service than other transit agencies in comparable cities and it also helps RTA retain some degree of political autonomy. However, it also makes RTA unusually susceptible to economic downturns.

In recent years, RTA has undertaken great efforts to improve efficiency and eliminate unnecessary costs. These efforts have included mergers with the two remaining autonomous transit agencies in Cuyahoga County, the North Olmsted Municipal Bus Line and Maple Heights Transit, and the redesigning of its routes in the suburban areas southeast, west, and south of Cuyahoga County.

RTA is also funded in part by transit advertising and sponsorships, this is currently provided by Gateway Outdoor Advertising. Gatewayoutdoor.com

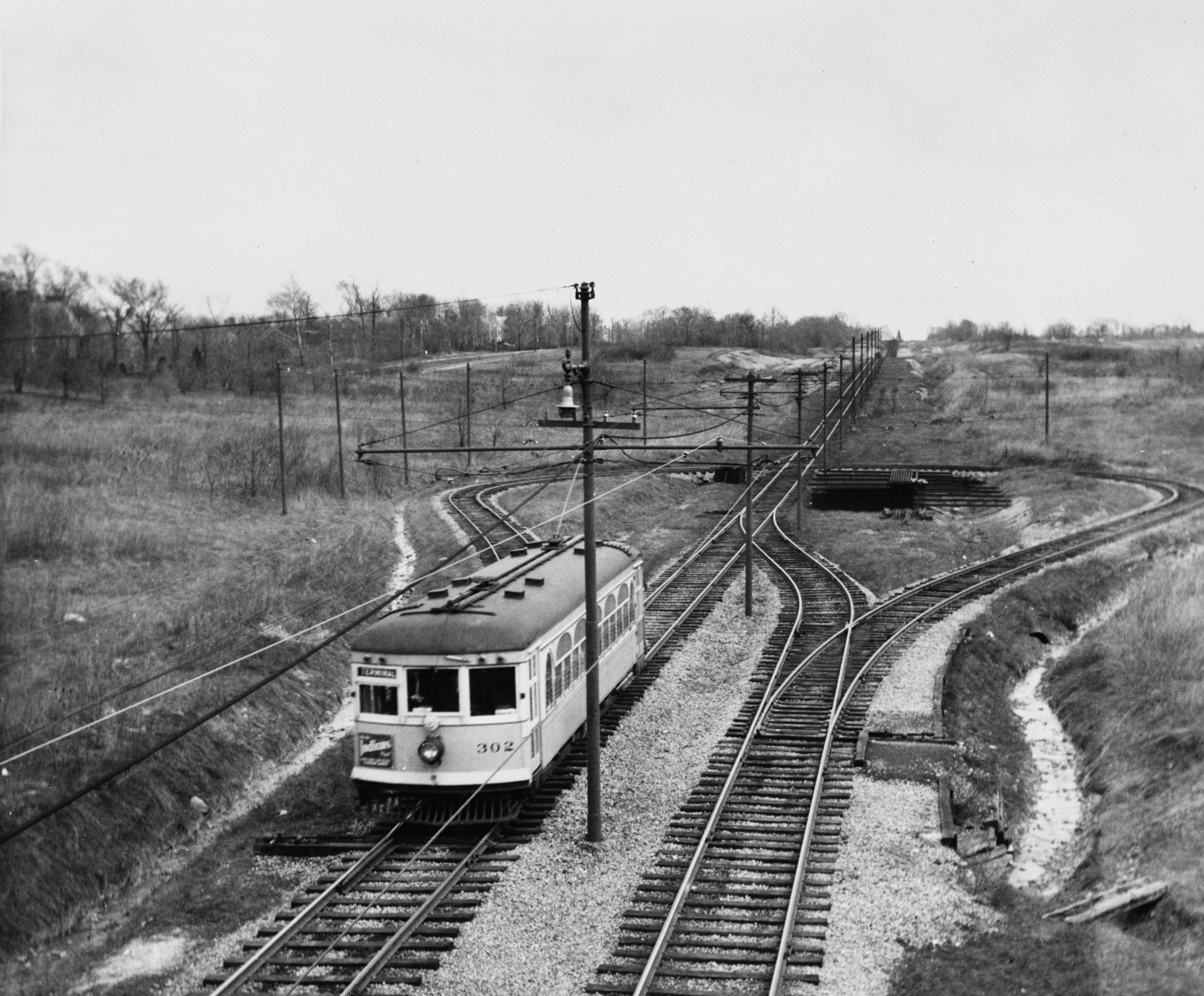
A Shaker Rapid car at the Warrensville Center Road Loop in 1936

== CTS fleet ==
- 1946 Pullman PCC A11 (50) and 1946 St. Louis Car Company A12 (25) – all sold to Toronto in 1952 and all retired by TTC.
- Marmon-Herrington TC48-T5 and TC44-T7 trolleybus – ordered 49 in 1951 and 1952 and retired in 1960s (sold to Mexico City's Servicio de Transportes Eléctricos and since retired)

== See also ==
- Cleveland railroad history
- Great American Streetcar Scandal
- Laketran (Lake County)
- Lorain County Transit
- Akron, Bedford and Cleveland Railroad
