= West 65th–Lorain station =

Rapid transit station in Cleveland

W. 65–Lorain
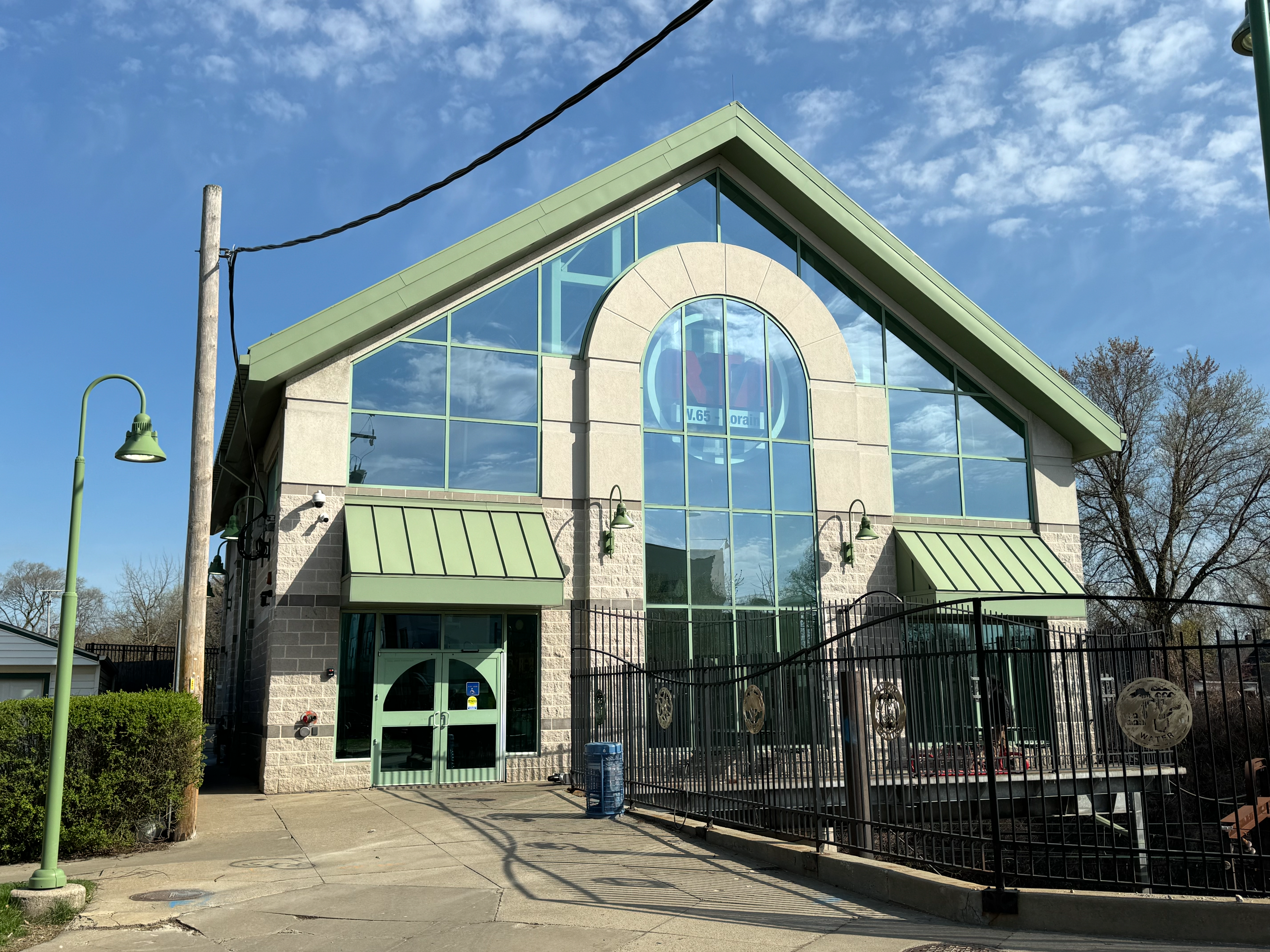
- West 65th–Lorain station house

General information
- Location: 6200 Corona Court; Cleveland, Ohio
- Coordinates: 41°28′37″N 81°43′43″W
- Owner: Greater Cleveland Regional Transit Authority
- Line: NS Lake Erie District
- Platforms: 1 island platform
- Tracks: 2
- Connections: RTA: 22, 25, 71

Construction
- Structure type: Below-grade
- Parking: 21 spaces
- Cycle facilities: Racks
- Accessible: Yes

Other information
- Website: riderta.com/facilities/w65

History
- Opened: August 14, 1955; 71 years ago
- Rebuilt: 2004
- Former names: West 65th–Madison
- Original company: Cleveland Transit System

Services
Preceding station	Rapid Transit	Following station
West Boulevard–Cudell toward Airport	Red Line	West 25th–Ohio City toward Windermere
Location

West 65th–Lorain station is a station on the RTA Red Line in Cleveland, Ohio. It is located between Lorain Avenue (Ohio State Route 10) and Madison Avenue at West 61st Street.

The station comprises a main headhouse having an entrance at the corner of West 61st Street and Lawn Avenue. The platform extends northwest from the main station house with an alternate entrance from Madison Avenue near West 65th Street. There are a limited number of parking spaces provided along West 61st Street between the station entrance and Lorain Avenue.

== History ==
The station opened on August 14, 1955, when the west side portion of the CTS Rapid Transit began operation. Ridership dwindled by the 1990s, and RTA considered closing the station.

Instead, the EcoVillage project was formed and worked on a proposal to rebuild the station as part of a neighborhood renovation project. The new $4-million station opened on September 21, 2004. The cornerstone of a public-private partnership, EcoVillage is believed to be one of the first "green” rail stations in the country.

=== EcoVillage ===
The present station opened in 2004, was constructed as a result of the Cleveland EcoVillage project as a catalyst for neighborhood development and to promote the use of environmentally-friendly transportation. The EcoVillage project, a partnership between the Detroit Shoreway Community Development Organization and EcoCity Cleveland, promotes the development of homes and businesses that incorporate the latest environmental thinking and are expressly linked to transit—so EcoVillage residents can live, shop, and work within a compact neighborhood that gives people convenient access to transit options. The rapid transit station is intended to be the centerpiece for an urban neighborhood rebuilding with the environment in mind.

== Notable places nearby ==
- Detroit–Shoreway neighborhood
- St. Stephen's Catholic Church
- Max S. Hayes High School

== Artwork ==
The station contains "Strive for Harmony", a mural created by artist Gregory Aliberti in 2004.

== Gallery ==
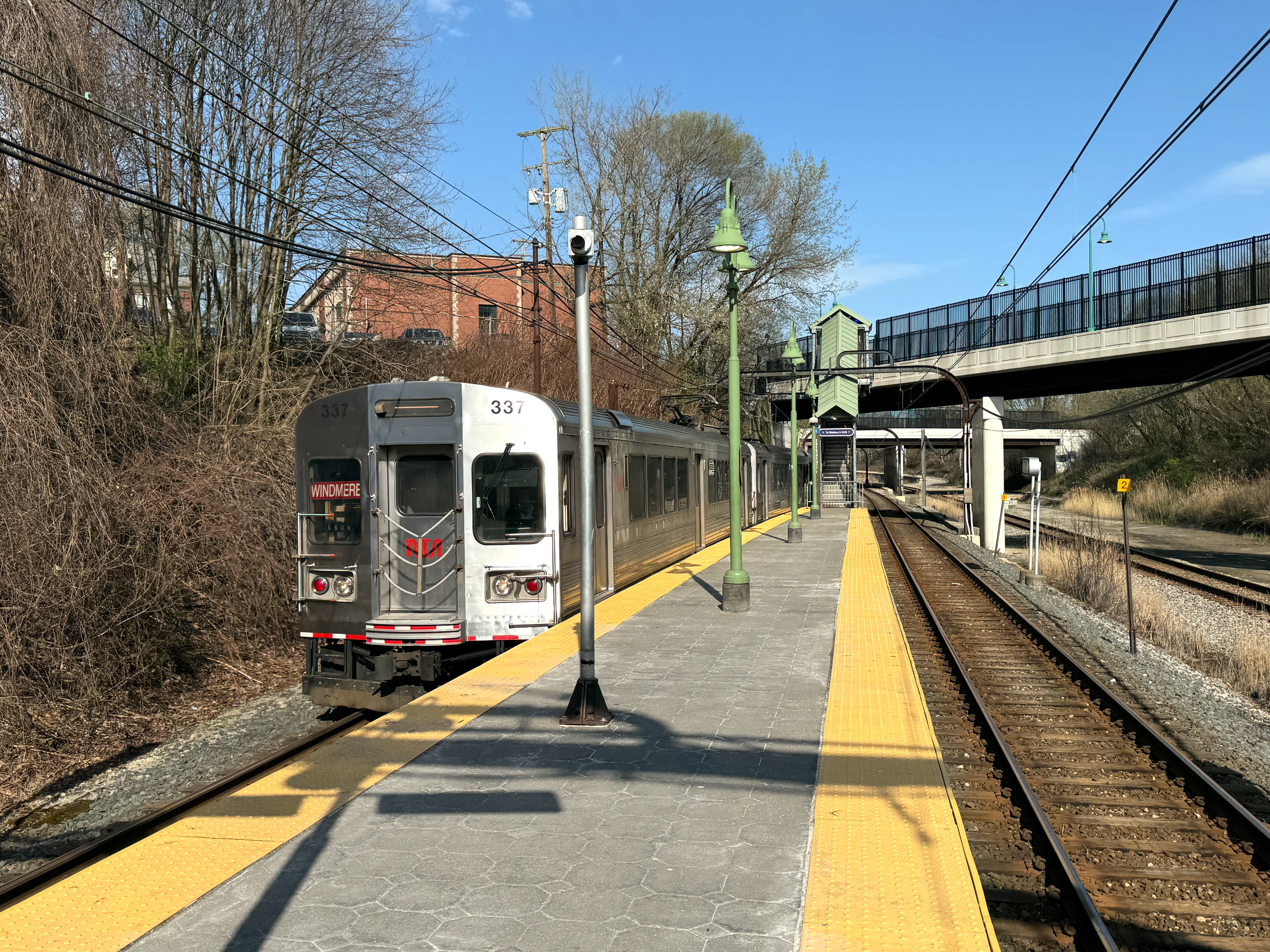

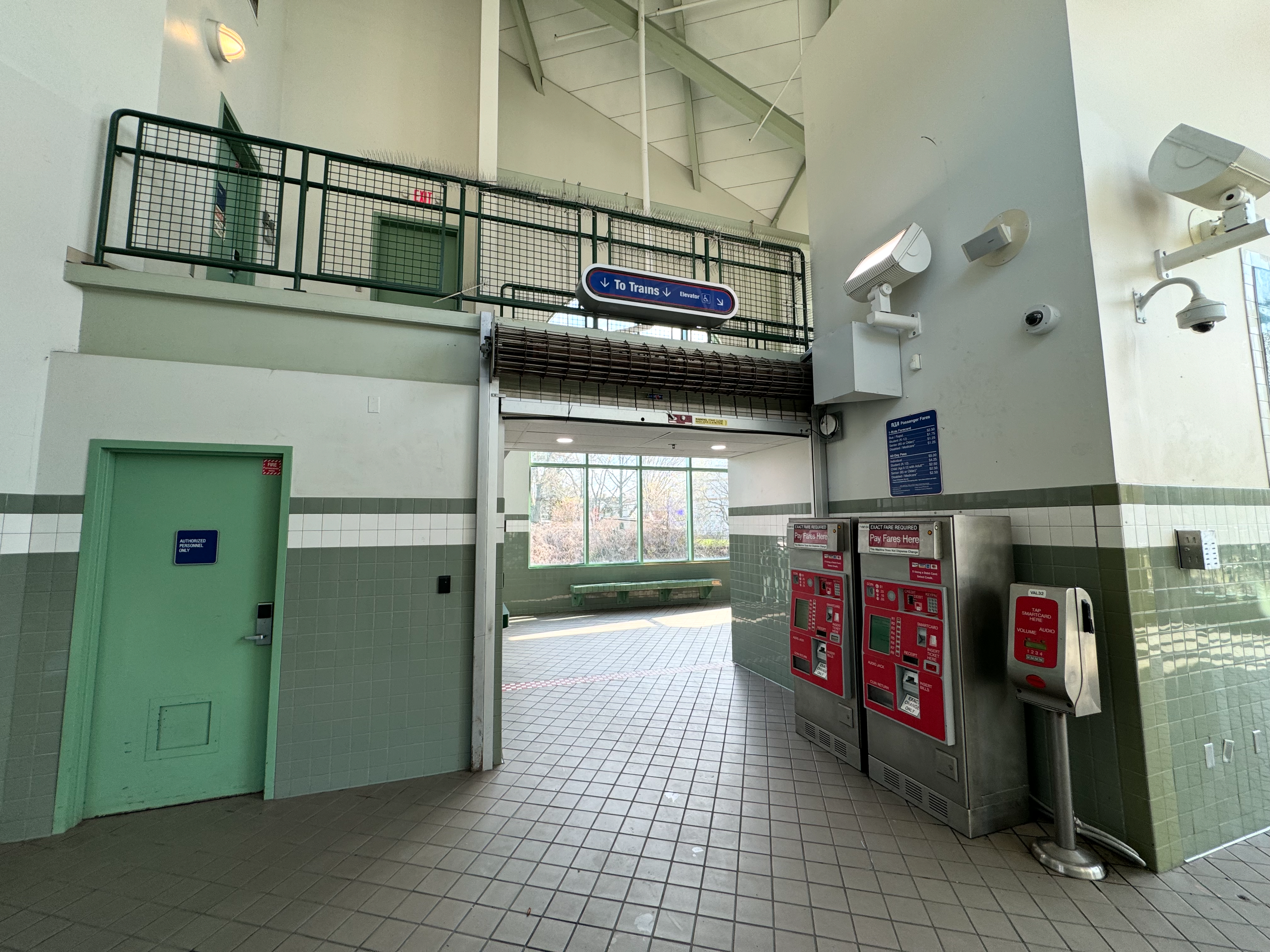

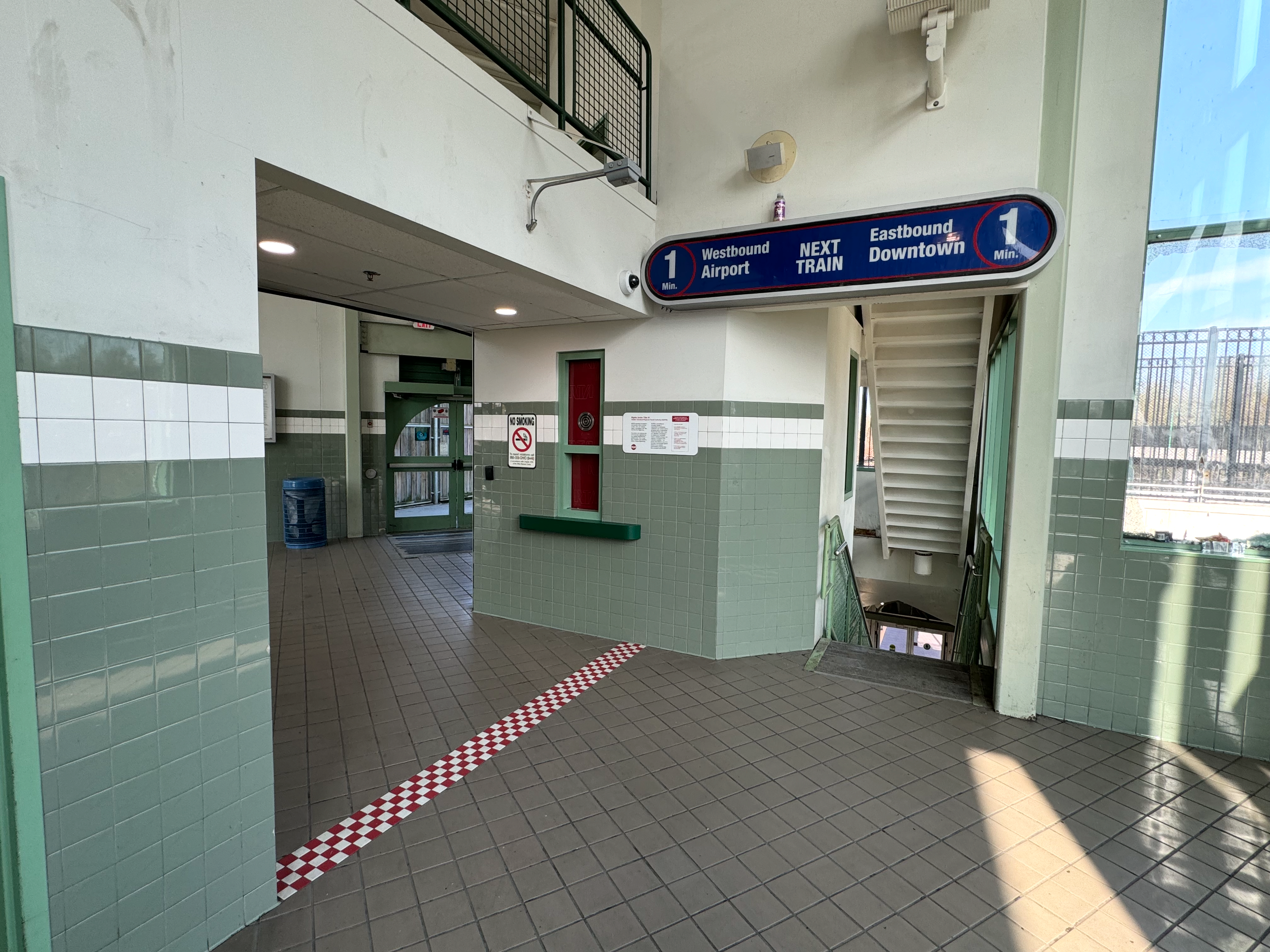

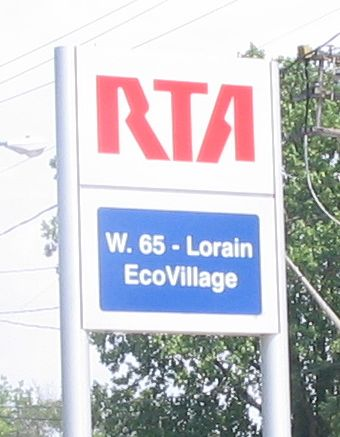
