= Perry–Payne Building =

- U.S. National Register of Historic Places
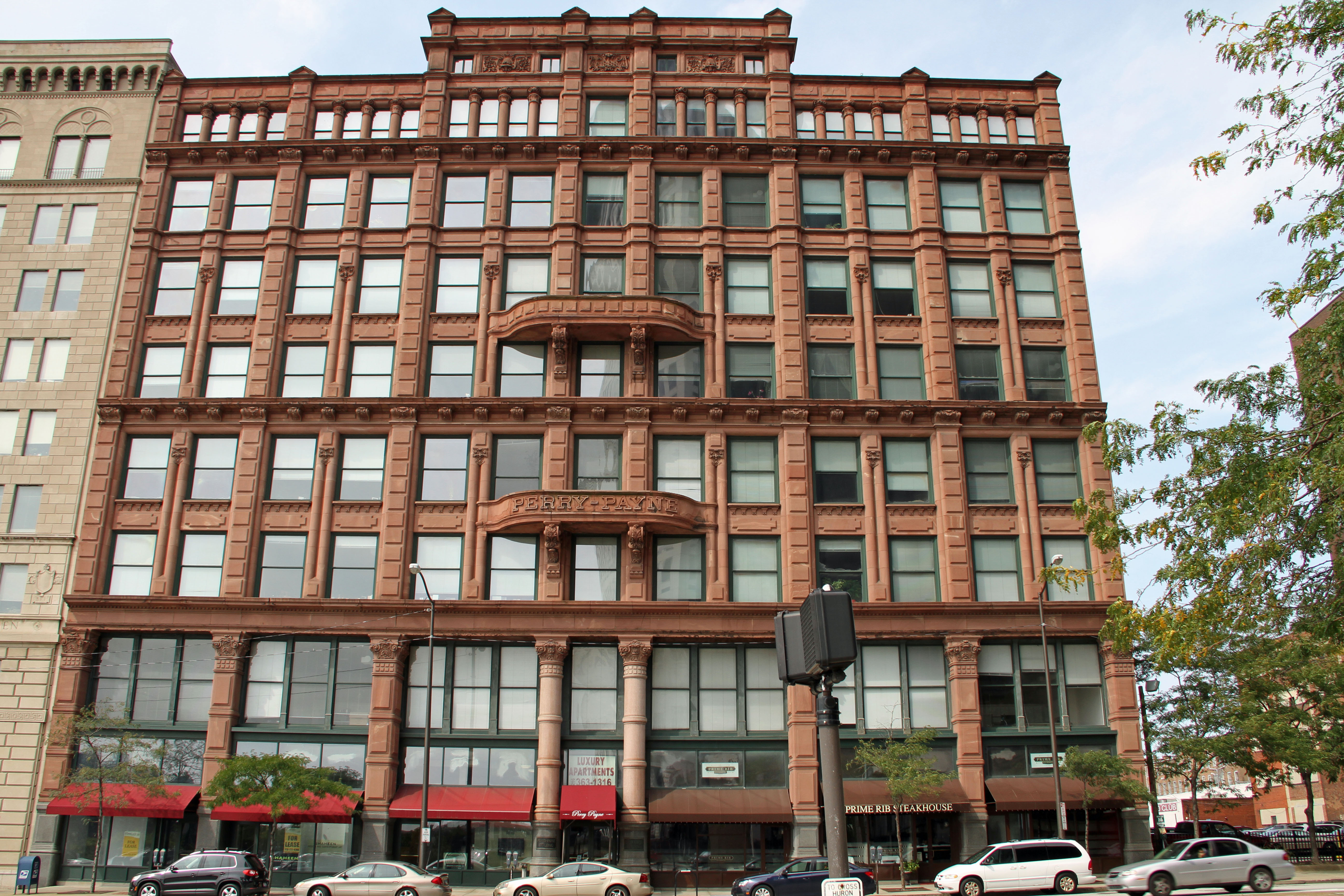
- Front of the building

- Location within Cleveland Location within Ohio Location within the United States
- Location: 740 Superior Ave., Cleveland, Ohio
- Coordinates: 41°29′51″N 81°41′55″W
- Area: 0.5 acres (2,000 m^{2})
- Built: 1888
- Architect: Cudell and Richardson
- NRHP reference No.: 73001415
- Added to NRHP: July 16, 1973

The Perry–Payne Building is a historic commercial building in downtown Cleveland, Ohio, United States in the city's historic Warehouse District. Designed by prominent architects for a leading politician, it gained national attention as an architectural masterpiece upon its completion. Long home to the offices of manufacturing and transportation companies, it has been named a historic site.

== Architecture ==
Built primarily of stone and designed by the firm of Cudell and Richardson, the eight-story Perry–Payne Building possesses unusual fenestration: its seven-bay facade is composed largely of windows, while the sides are almost windowless. Its design represents a crucial technological juncture: the exterior is primarily traditional stonemasonry, but reduced stonework – and thus exceptionally large amounts of window area – are permitted by the use of structural iron inside the building. Its floors are made of concrete and tile, unlike the wooden floors of earlier commercial buildings produced by Cudell and Richardson. At the time of its completion, the building included a large and unique lightwell, an interior court with a glass roof, which has since been covered with flooring. When the Perry–Payne Building was completed, architects from across the United States came to examine its revolutionary new design, with particular attention being drawn to the lightwell; the attention given to the building produced fame for Cudell and Richardson.

== History ==
Begun in 1888 and completed in the following year, the Perry–Payne Building was named for its owner and his family: it was erected for politician Henry B. Payne, and "Perry" was his wife's maiden name. During the building's early years, its offices were occupied primarily by firms in the shipping and iron-manufacturing businesses; such companies remained its tenants for many years, as these industries held crucial rôles in Cleveland's industrial economy. It is no longer used as offices or for any other commercial purpose: from 1994 to 1995, it was remodelled into a 92-unit apartment building.

In 1973, the Perry–Payne Building was listed on the National Register of Historic Places, qualifying because its historically significant architecture, and when Cleveland's Warehouse District was listed on the Register as a historic district in 1982, it was named one of the district's contributing properties.
