= West 25th–Ohio City station =

Rapid transit station in Cleveland

W. 25–Ohio City
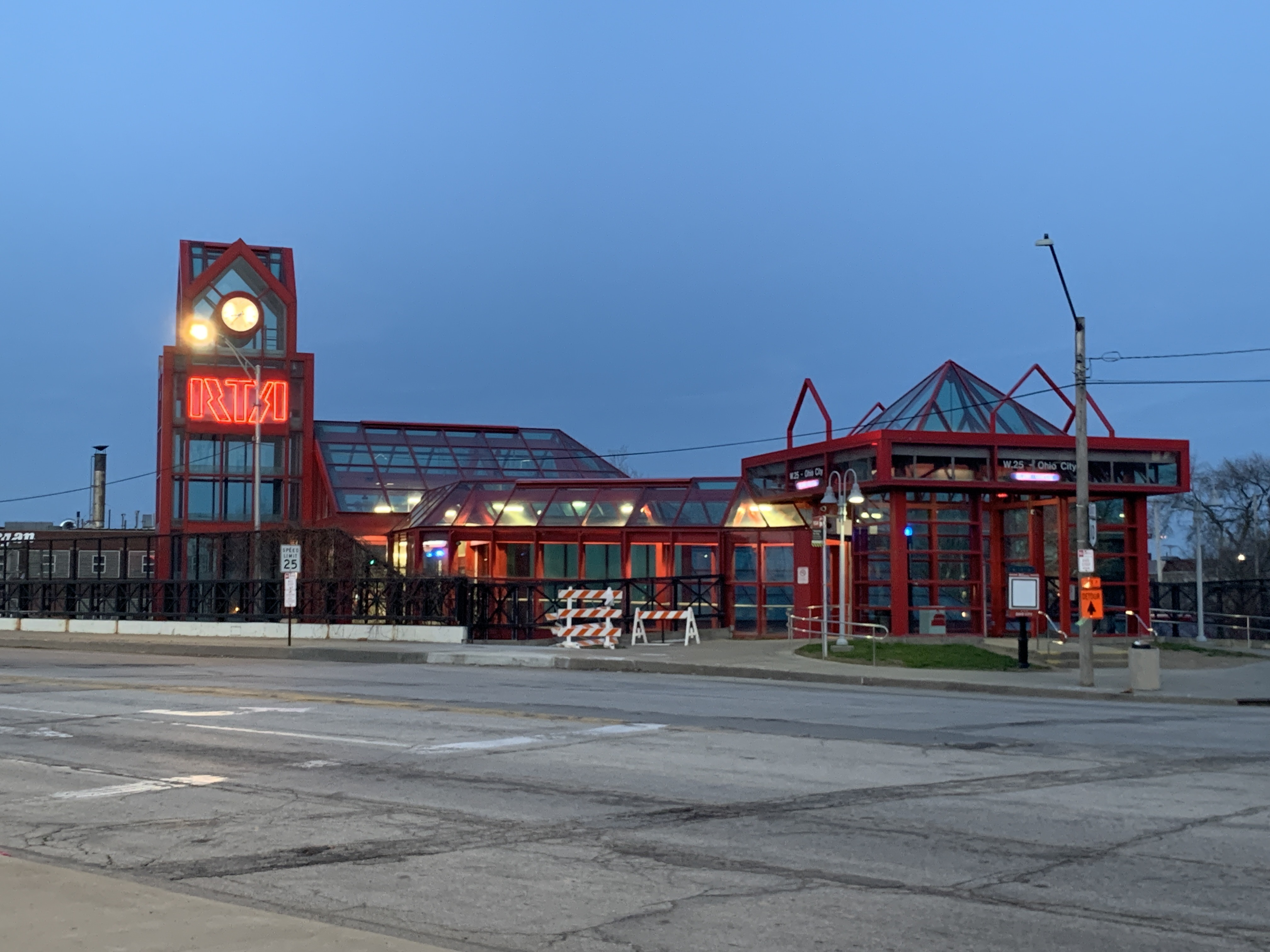
- West 25th–Ohio City station in 2022

General information
- Location: 2350 Lorain Avenue; Cleveland, Ohio
- Coordinates: 41°29′5″N 81°42′4″W
- Owner: Greater Cleveland Regional Transit Authority
- Line: Cleveland Union Terminal
- Platforms: 1 island platform
- Tracks: 2
- Connections: RTA: 22, 25, 45, 51, 51A

Construction
- Structure type: Below-grade
- Cycle facilities: Racks
- Accessible: Yes

History
- Opened: August 14, 1955; 71 years ago
- Rebuilt: 1992
- Former names: Lorain–West 25th
- Original company: Cleveland Transit System

Services
Preceding station	Rapid Transit	Following station
West 65th–Lorain toward Airport	Red Line	Tower City toward Windermere
Location

West 25th–Ohio City station is a station on the RTA Red Line in the Ohio City neighborhood of Cleveland, Ohio. It is located at the intersection of West 24th Street, Abbey Avenue and Lorain Avenue (Ohio State Route 10), diagonally across Lorain Avenue from the West Side Market.

== History ==
The station opened on August 14, 1955, when the west side portion of the CTS Rapid Transit began operation.

When RTA began a program of rebuilding stations, including making them accessible compliant, West 25th Station was the first station renovated. The new $2.6 million station opened September 1992. The old utilitarian station was replaced with a station featuring a glass canopy with a bright red head house.

The Red Line Greenway opened alongside the station in 2021. This two-mile (3.2 km) paved trail, part of the Cleveland Metroparks system, connects the Centennial Lake Link Trail, West 25th–Ohio City station and West 65th–Lorain station.

== Artwork ==
The 1992 station renovation included an art installation by Cleveland artist Don Harvey.

== Notable places nearby ==
- Great Lakes Brewing Company
- Saint Ignatius High School
- St. John's Episcopal Church
- West Side Market

== Gallery ==
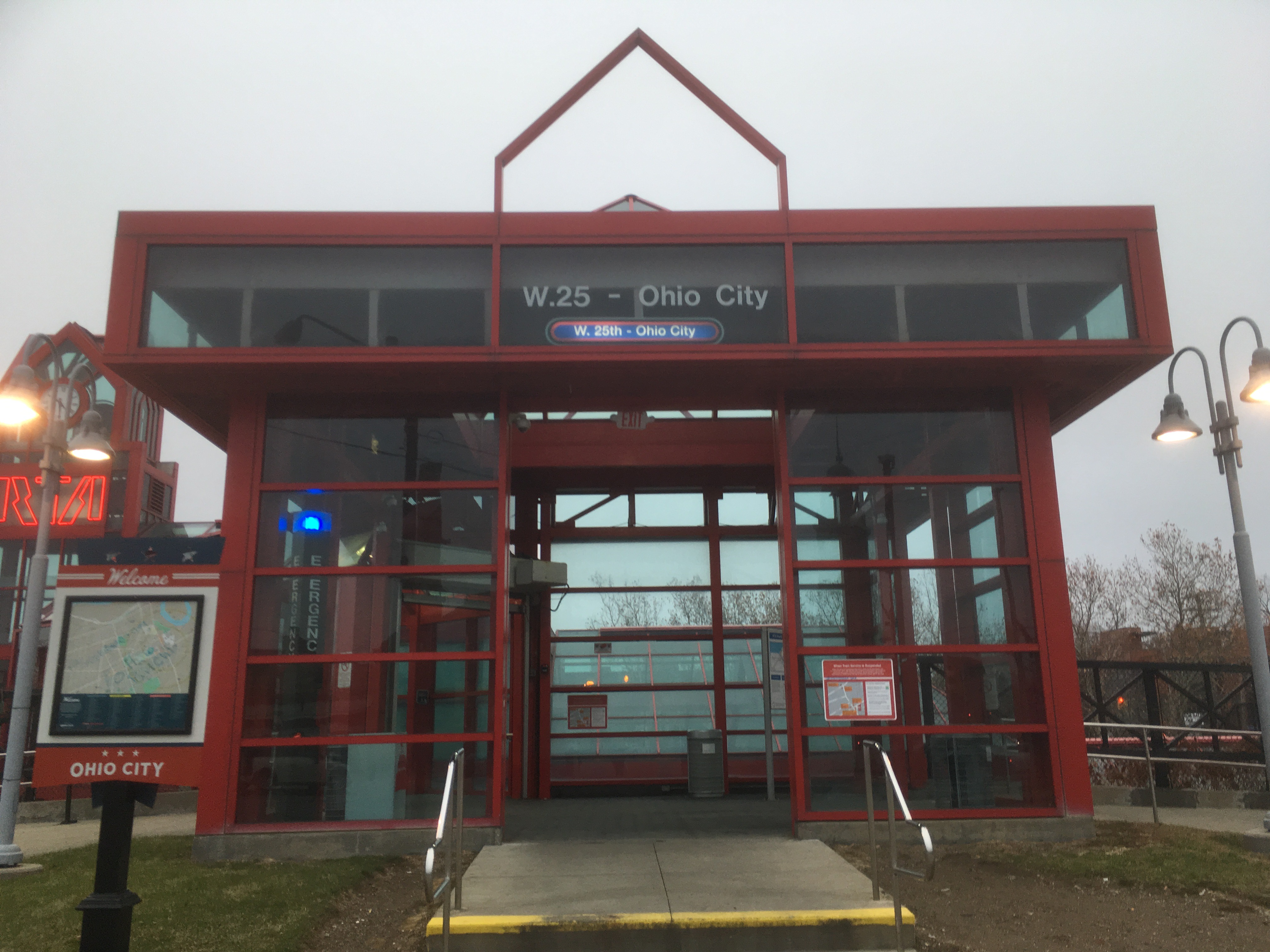
West 25th–Ohio City station entrance

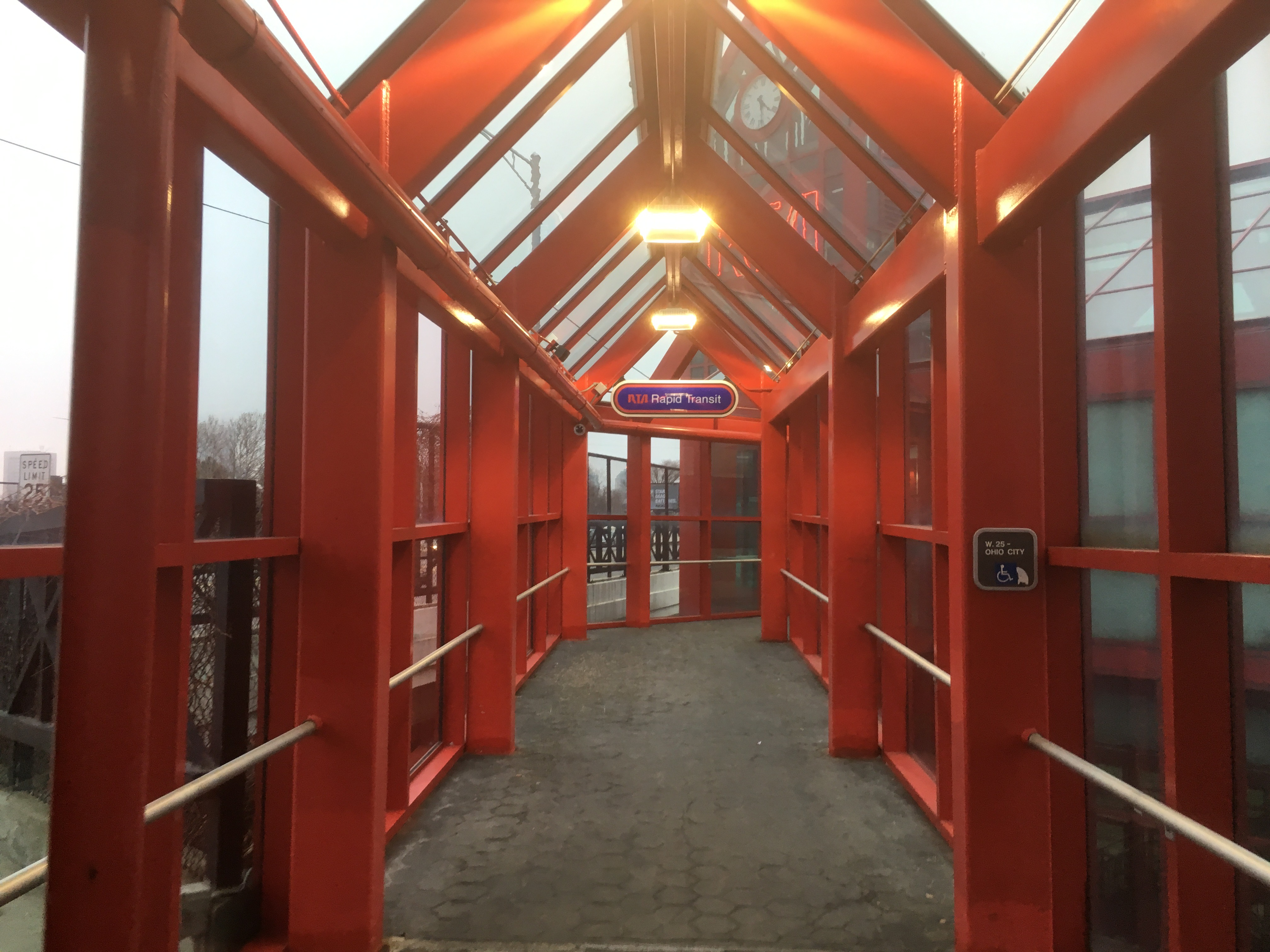
Walkway into West 25th–Ohio City station house

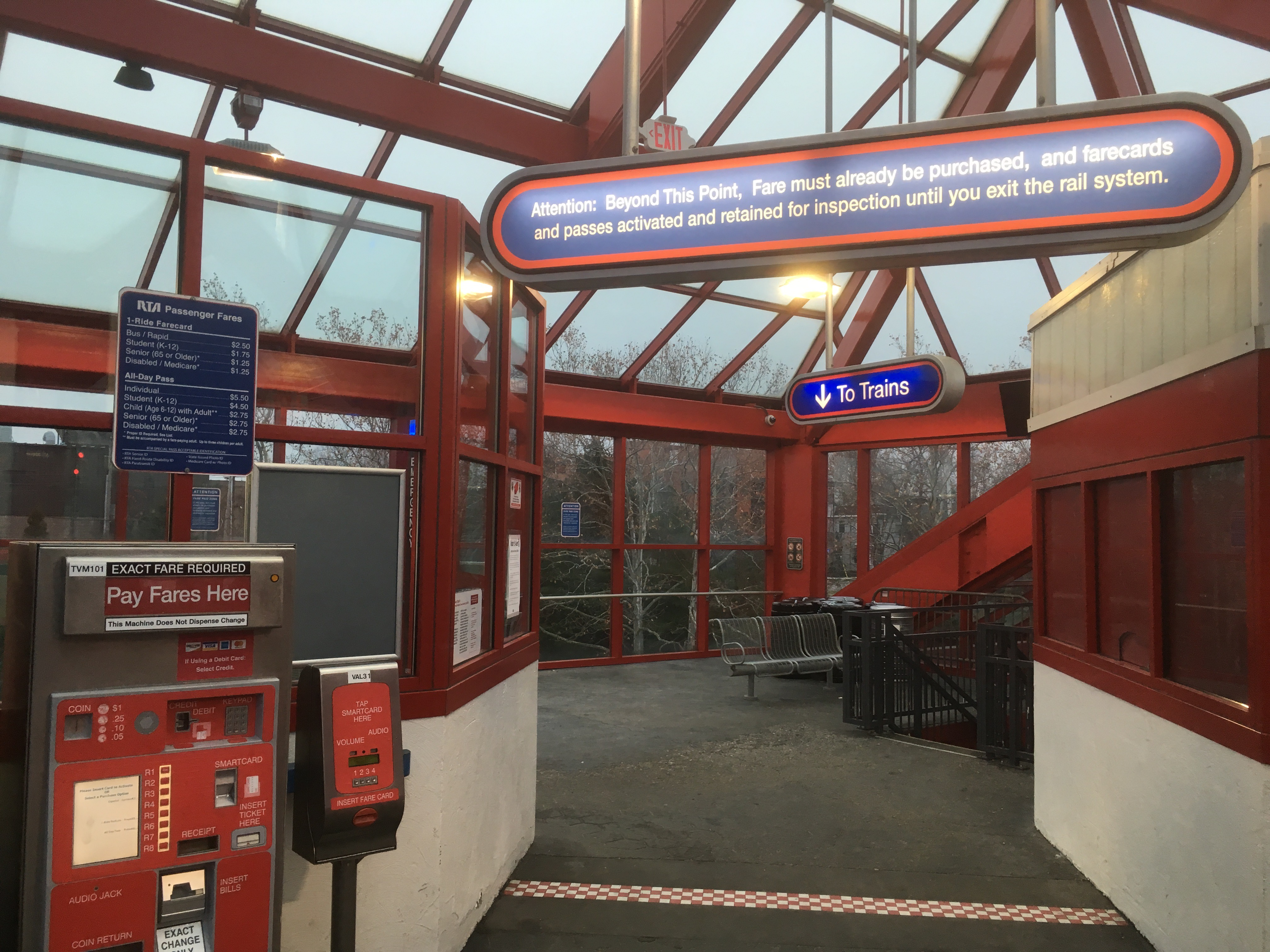
Interior of West 25th–Ohio City station house

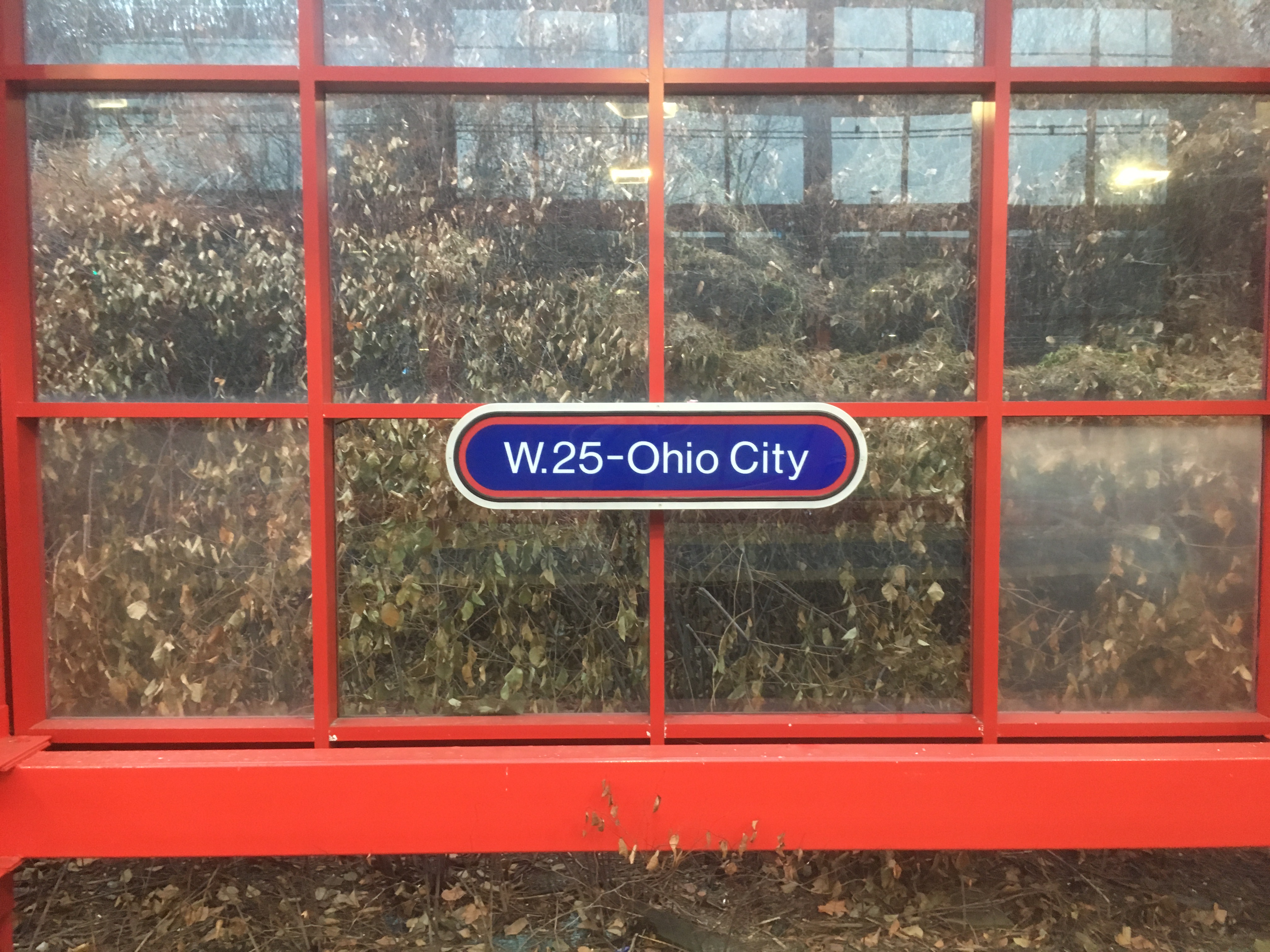
West 25th–Ohio City station sign

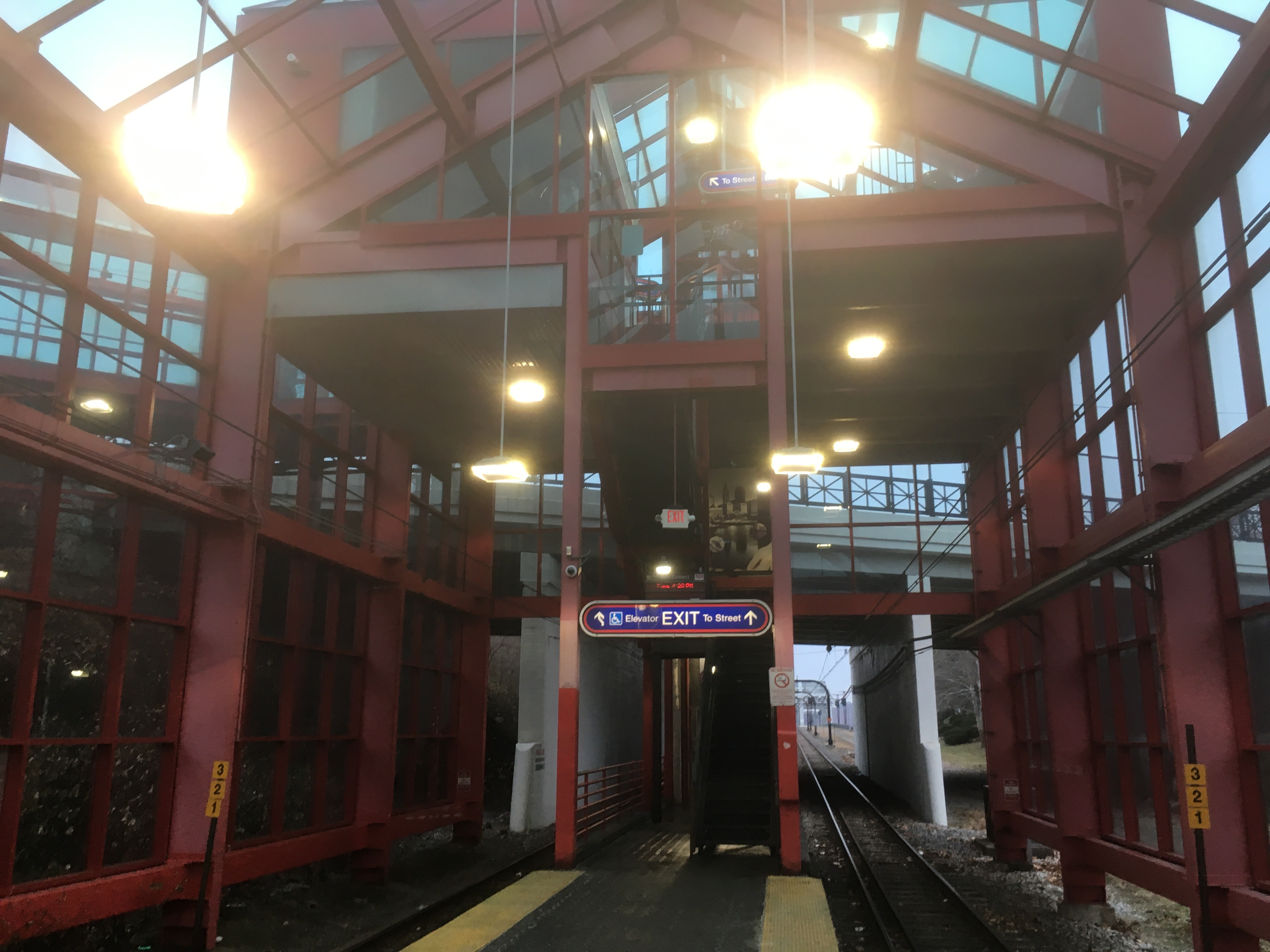
West 25th–Ohio City station platform

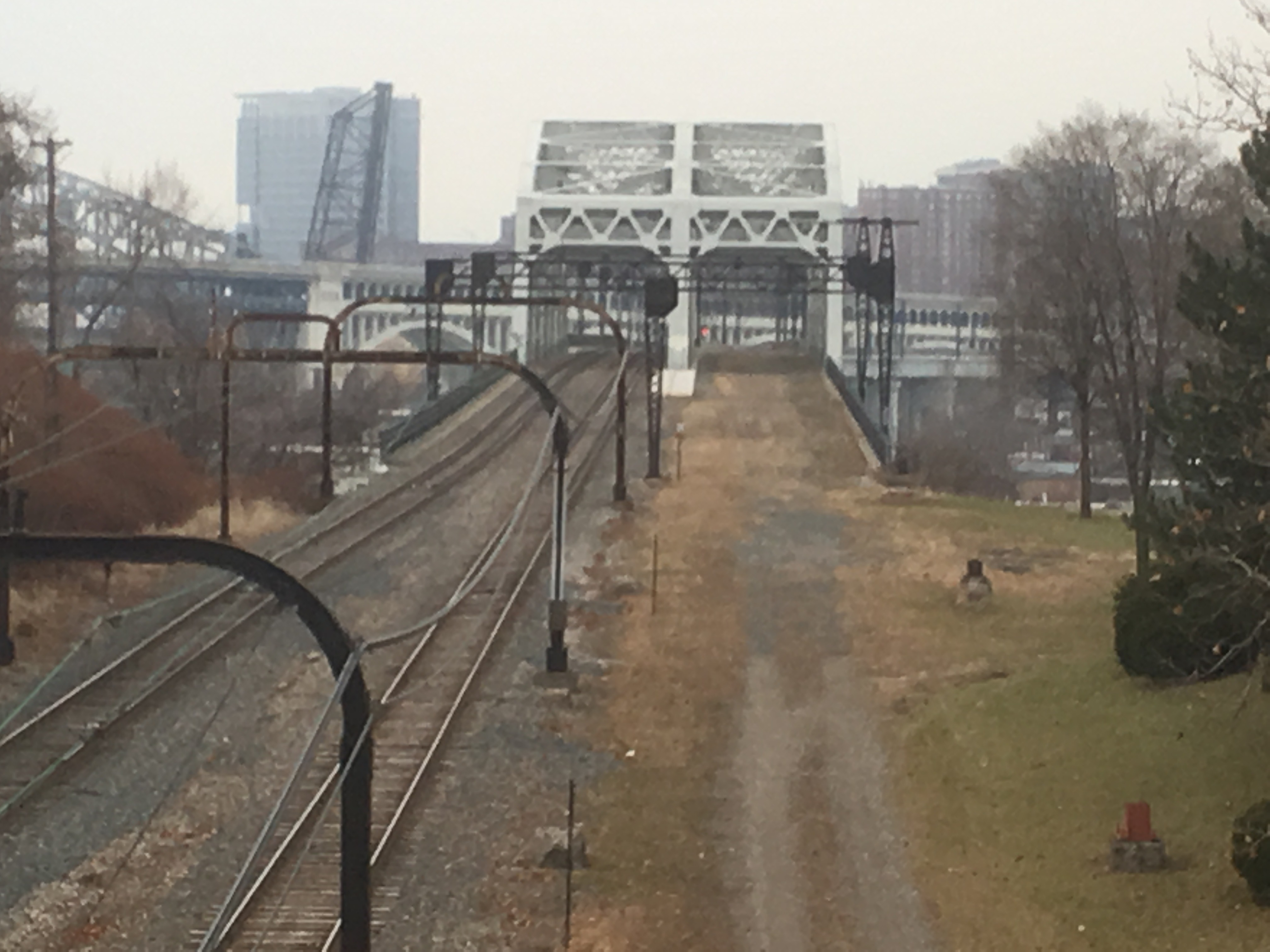
Rapid tracks adjacent to abandoned railroad right-of-way for Cleveland Union Terminal

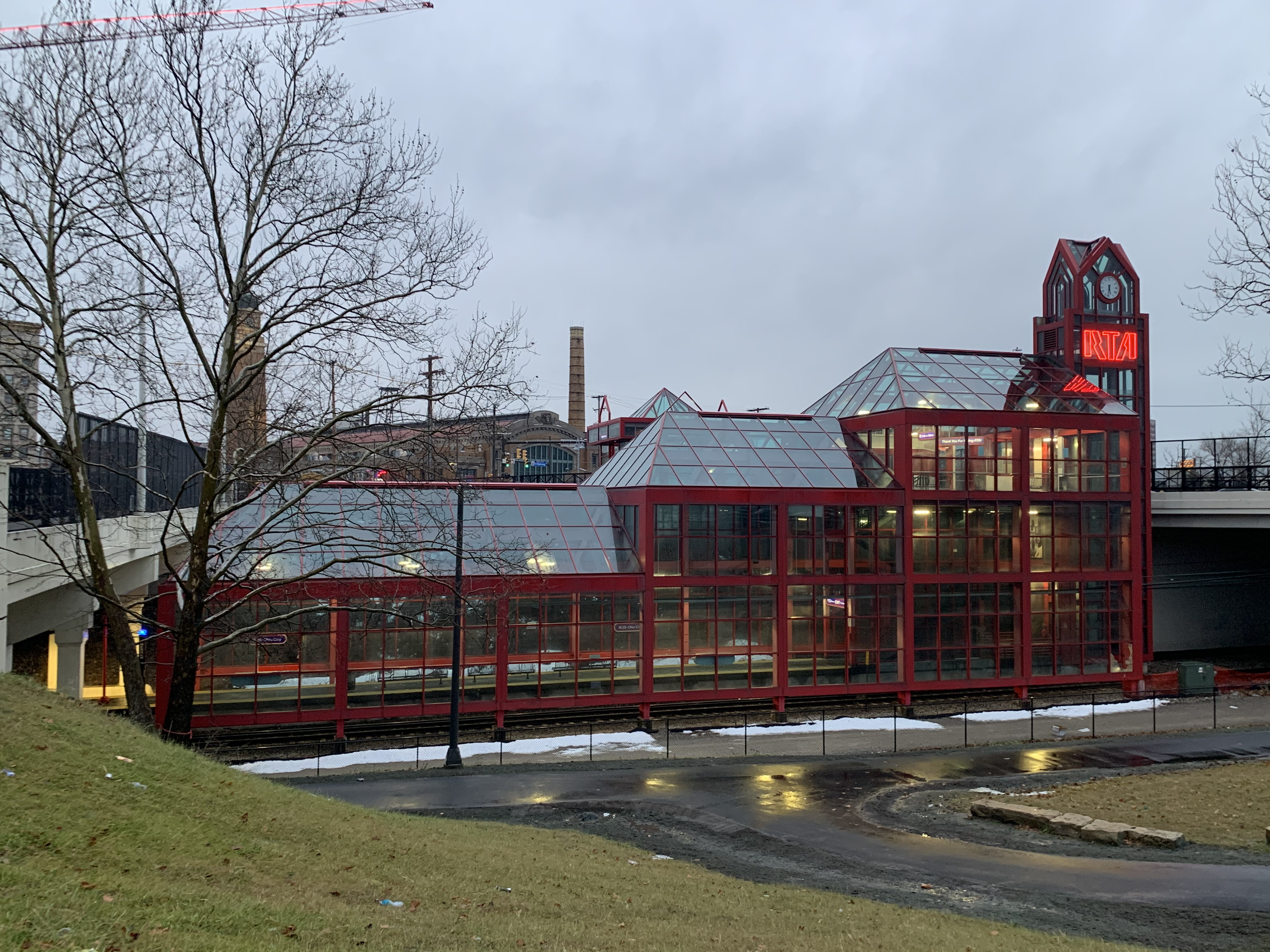
West 25th–Ohio City station house as seen from the Red Line Greenway
