= Cudell, Cleveland =

Neighborhood of Cleveland, Ohio, United States

Cudell
- Neighborhood of Cleveland
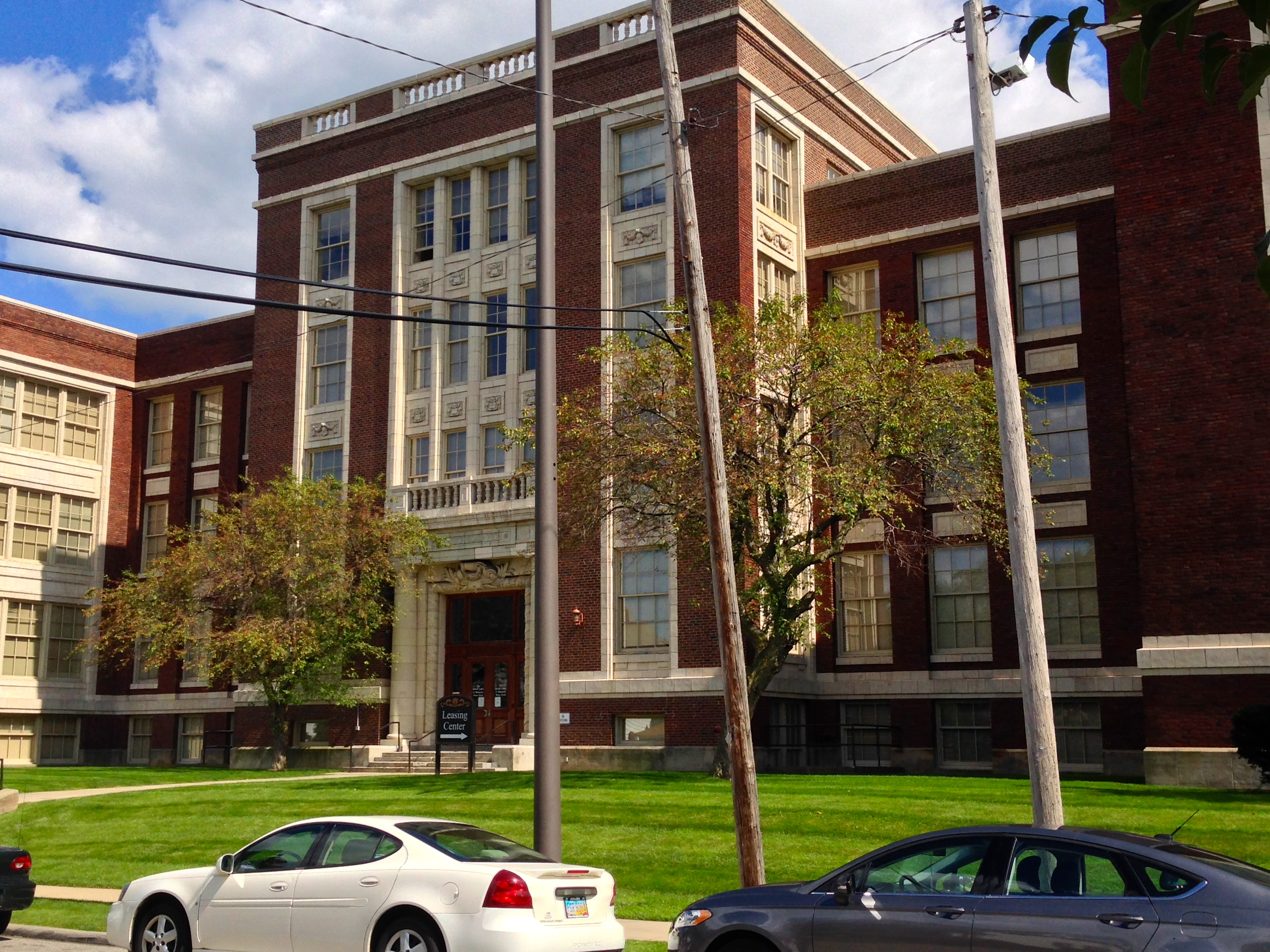
- West Technical High School building in Cudell

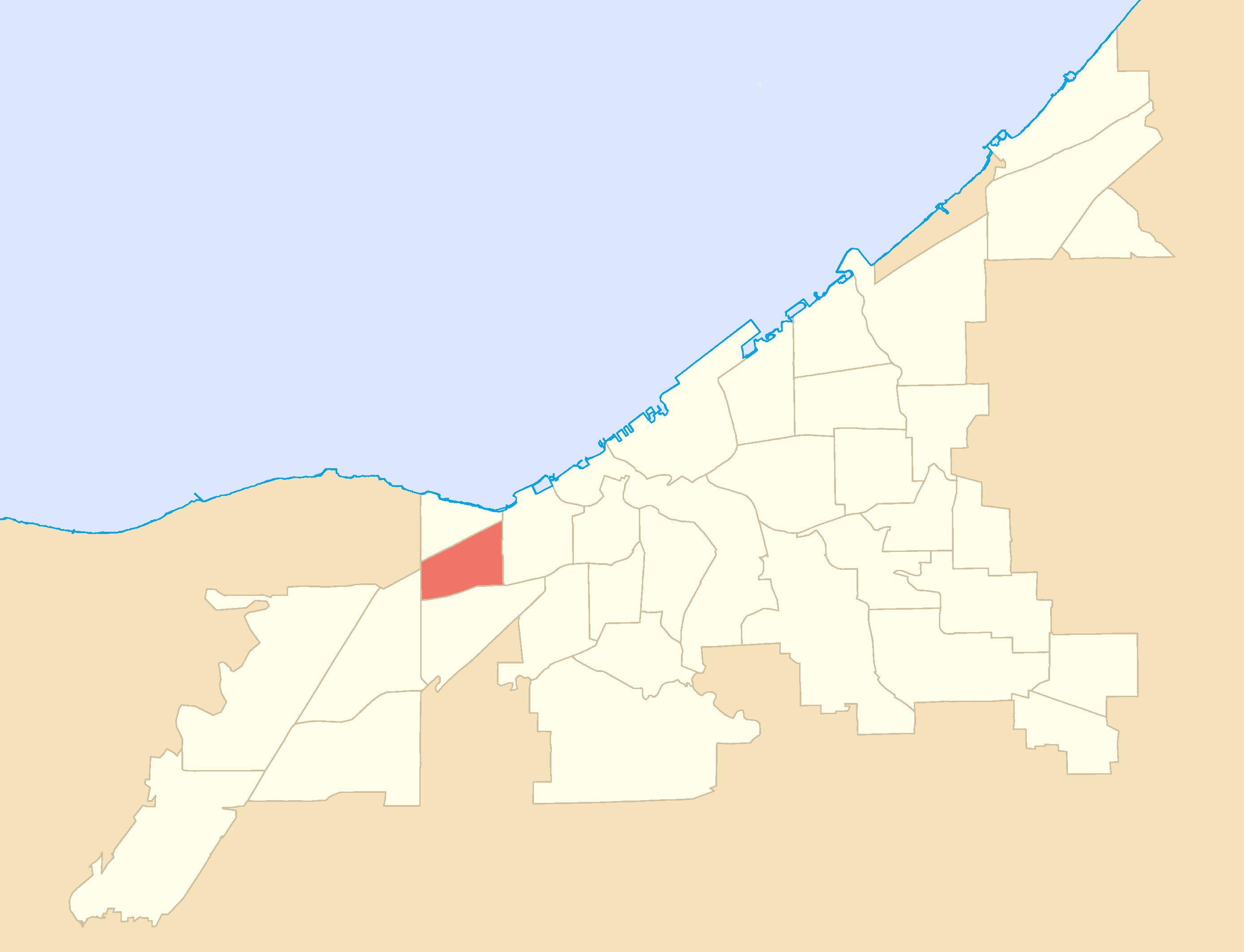
- Coordinates: 41.473°N 81.757°W
- Country: United States
- State: Ohio
- County: Cuyahoga County
- City: Cleveland

Population (2020)
  - Total: 9,960

Demographics
  - White: 46.8%
  - Black: 32.3%
  - Hispanic (of any race): 21.3%
  - Asian and Pacific Islander: 3.5%
  - Mixed and Other: 17.4%
- Time zone: UTC-5 (EST)
  - Summer (DST): UTC-4 (EDT)
- Area code: 216
- Median income: $26,425
- Source: 2020 U.S. Census

Cudell (/kəˈdɛl/) is a neighborhood on the West Side of Cleveland, Ohio. Named after Frank E. Cudell, the neighborhood has been a part of Cleveland since 1904, upon the completion of municipal annexation of the land by the city.

For Cleveland City Council, the Cudell neighborhood is split between the 11th and 12th wards, and is represented jointly by council members Nikki Hudson and Tanmay Shah.

== History ==
Cudell is located on land which was originally the property of Franklin Reuben Elliott, a horticulturalist and fruit farmer. The land changed ownership multiple times before being purchased by Frank E. Cudell, an architect whose firm designed multiple buildings in Cleveland, including apartment buildings on W. 99th St.

Cudell also deeded a portion of land along West Blvd. to the city which was used as a public park and eventually became home to Cudell Recreation Center. Today, the Cudell Tower, a memorial to Cudell from his wife, stands on the site of Cudell’s estate near the recreation center in an area known as Cudell Commons.

Throughout the 20th century, Cudell was a working class neighborhood populated by workers from nearby factories. Cudell’s population peaked at roughly 17,600 in 1940. In the 1960s, Interstate 90 was constructed, isolating the southern portion of the neighborhood.

In 2014, Cudell Recreation Center was the site of the shooting of Tamir Rice.

== Demographics ==
As of 2021, Cudell had a population of 9,960. Cudell is a racially diverse neighborhood. As of 2021, the population was 46.8% white, 32.3% black, 3.5% Asian-American/Pacific Islander, and 17.4% other races, with 21.3% of the population self-reporting as hispanic or latino.

40.9% of Cudell’s population, 50.4% of Cudell’s child population, and 31.7% of Cudell’s senior population live below the poverty line.

The majority of Cudell’s population resides in one- or two-family homes, with the exception of a concentration of apartments near the RTA Rapid Transit's West Boulevard–Cudell station.

== Gallery ==
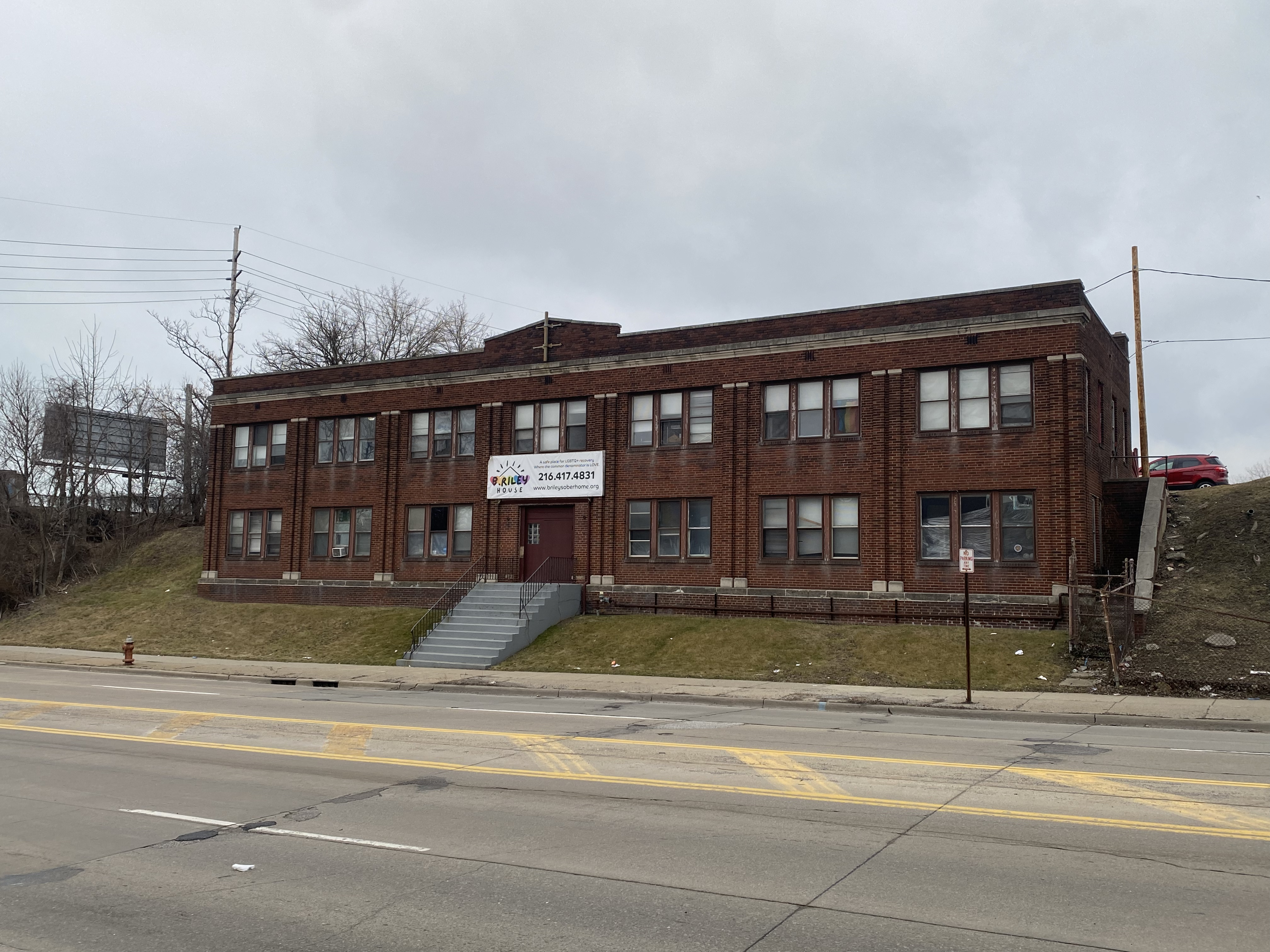
The B. Riley House, a substance abuse treatment facility for LGBTQ+ adults located on W. 117th St. in Cudell.

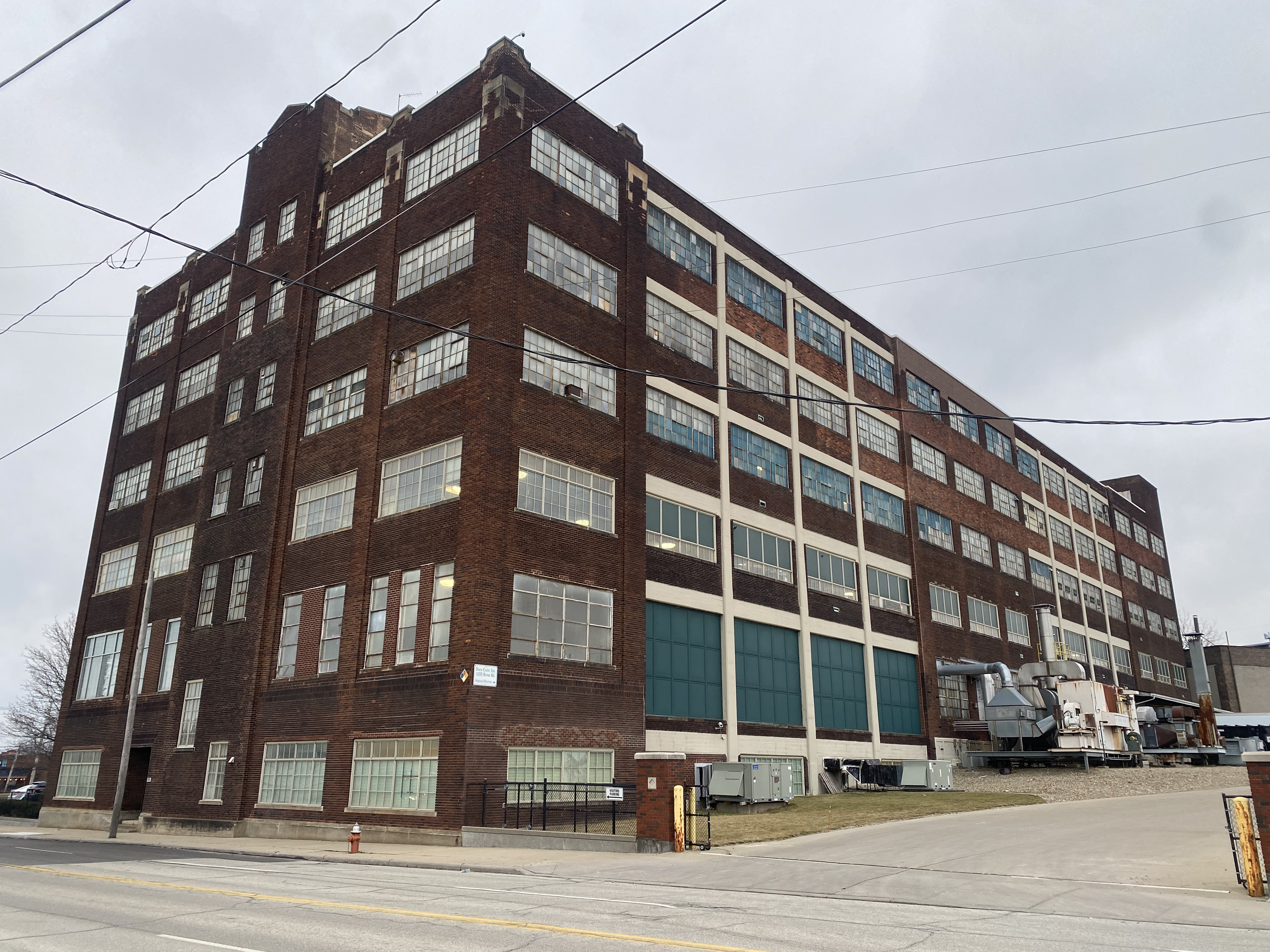
The Dorn Color Inc. building, located on Berea Rd. in Cudell.

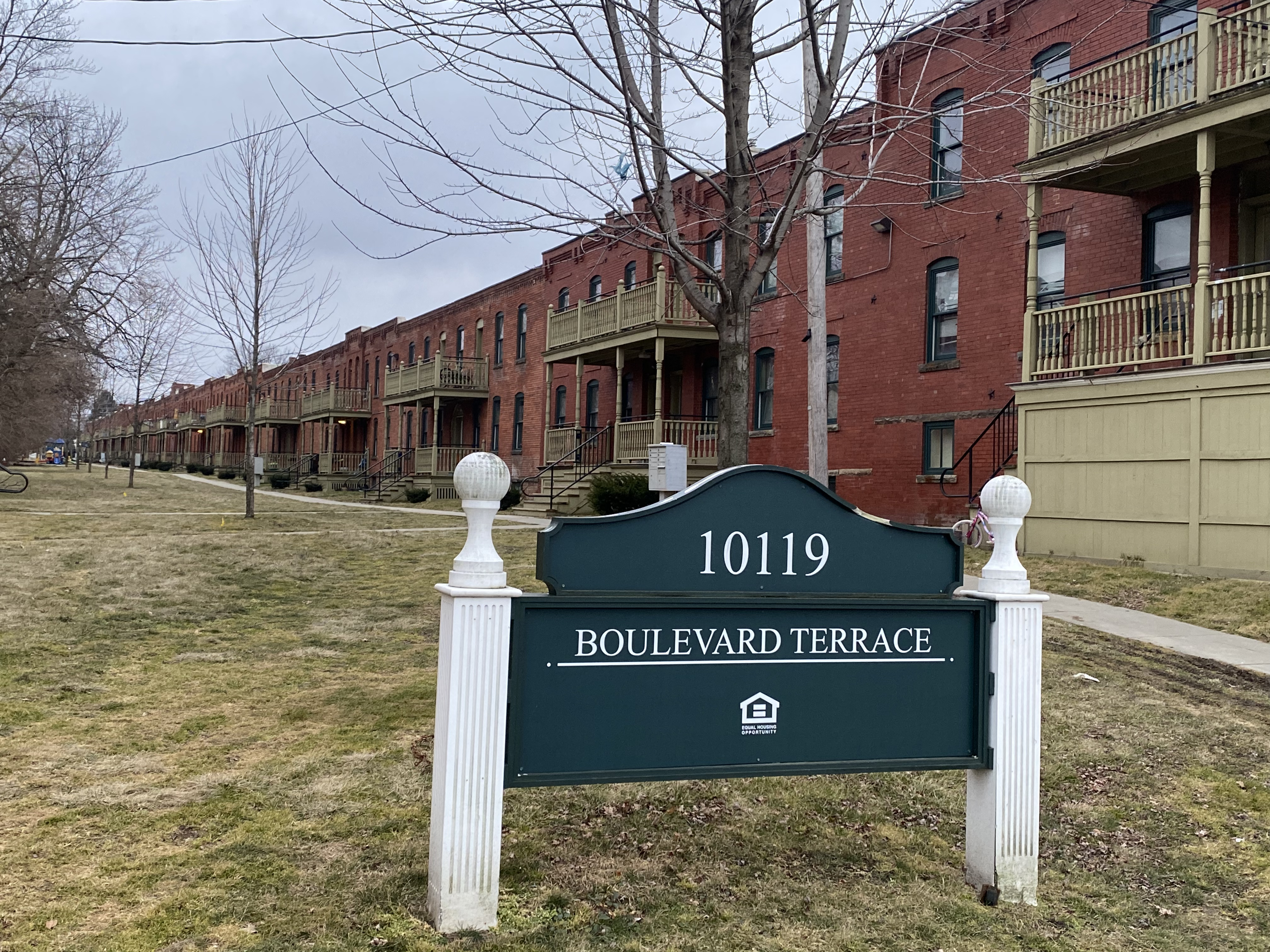
Boulevard Terrace, an apartment complex located near the West Boulevard-Cudell Station.

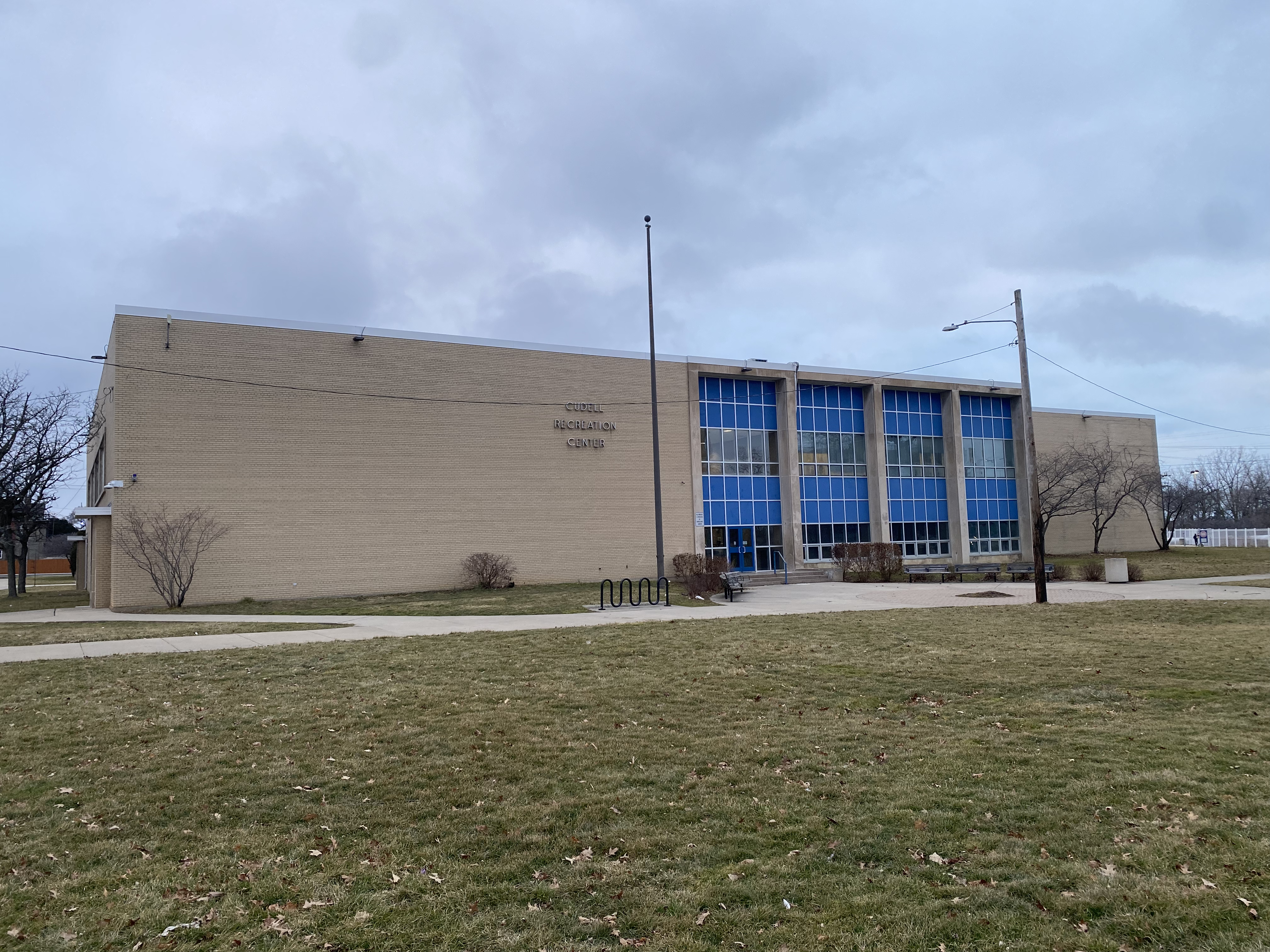
The Cudell Recreation Center, the site of the shooting of Tamir Rice.

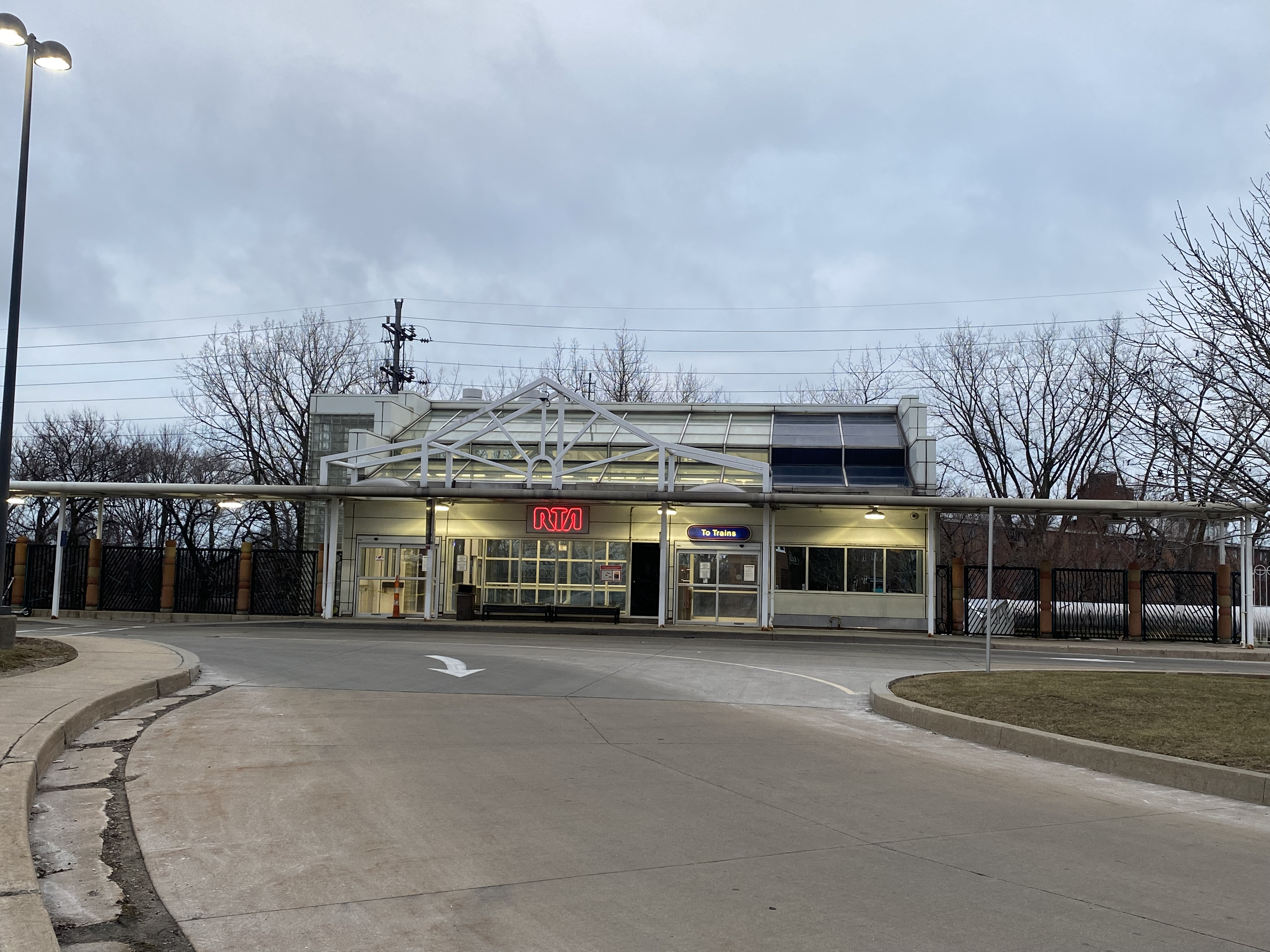
The West Boulevard-Cudell station, which provides RTA Rapid Transit service to the neighborhood and is located at the intersection of Detroit Ave. and West Blvd. in Cudell.

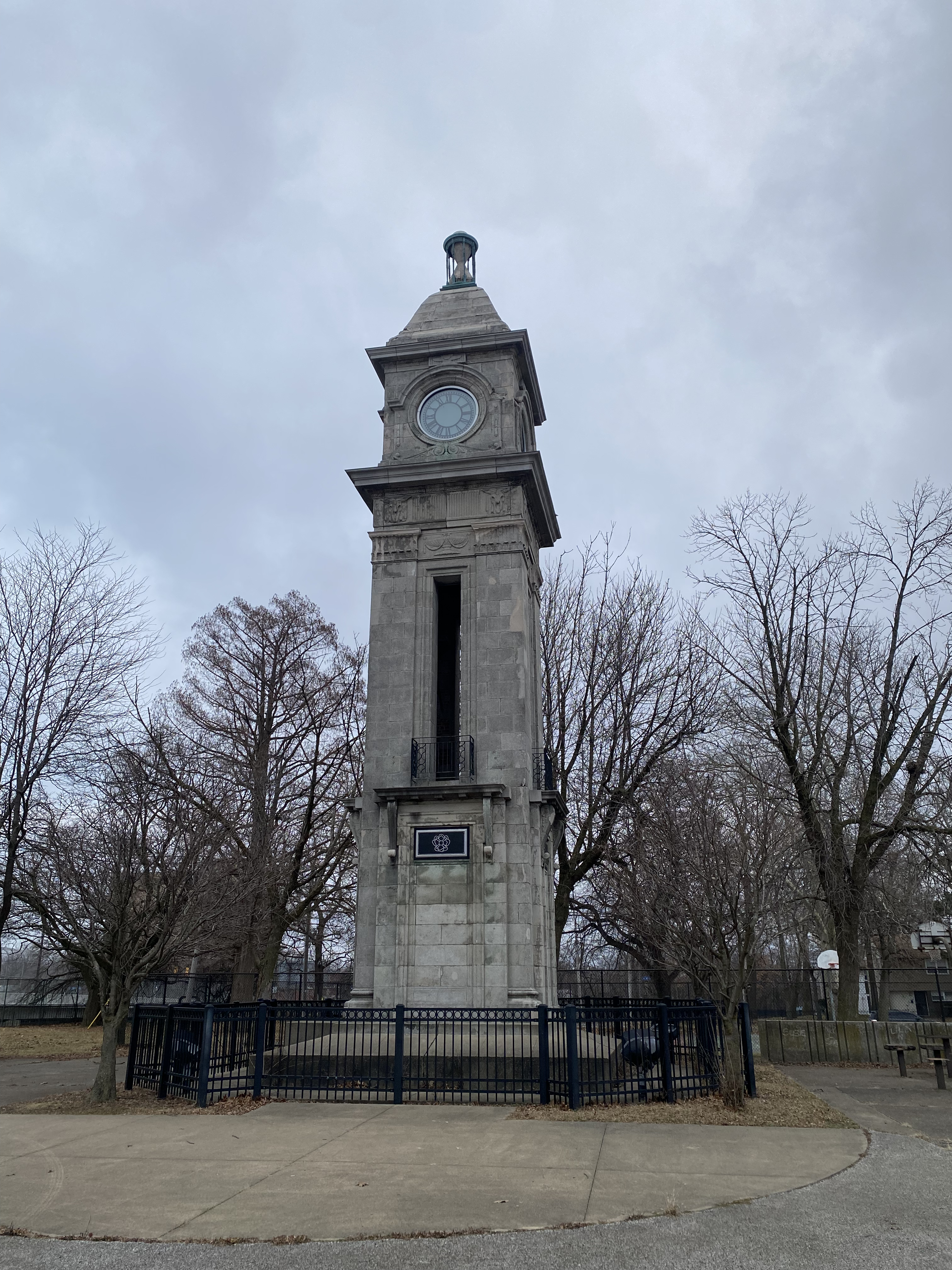
Cudell Tower, a monument to Frank E. Cudell located in Cudell Commons.

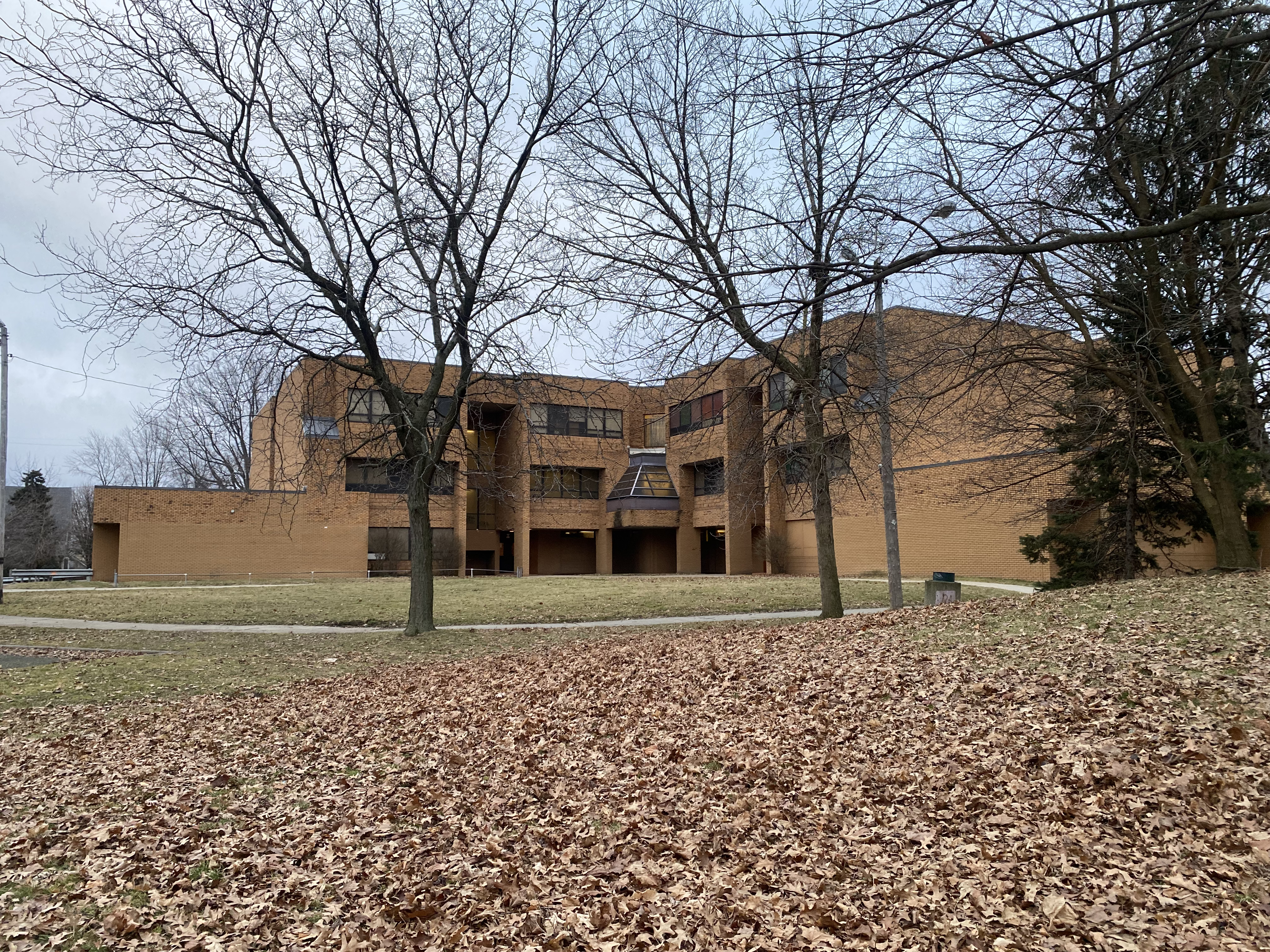
Marion C. Seltzer Elementary School, located in Cudell Commons.

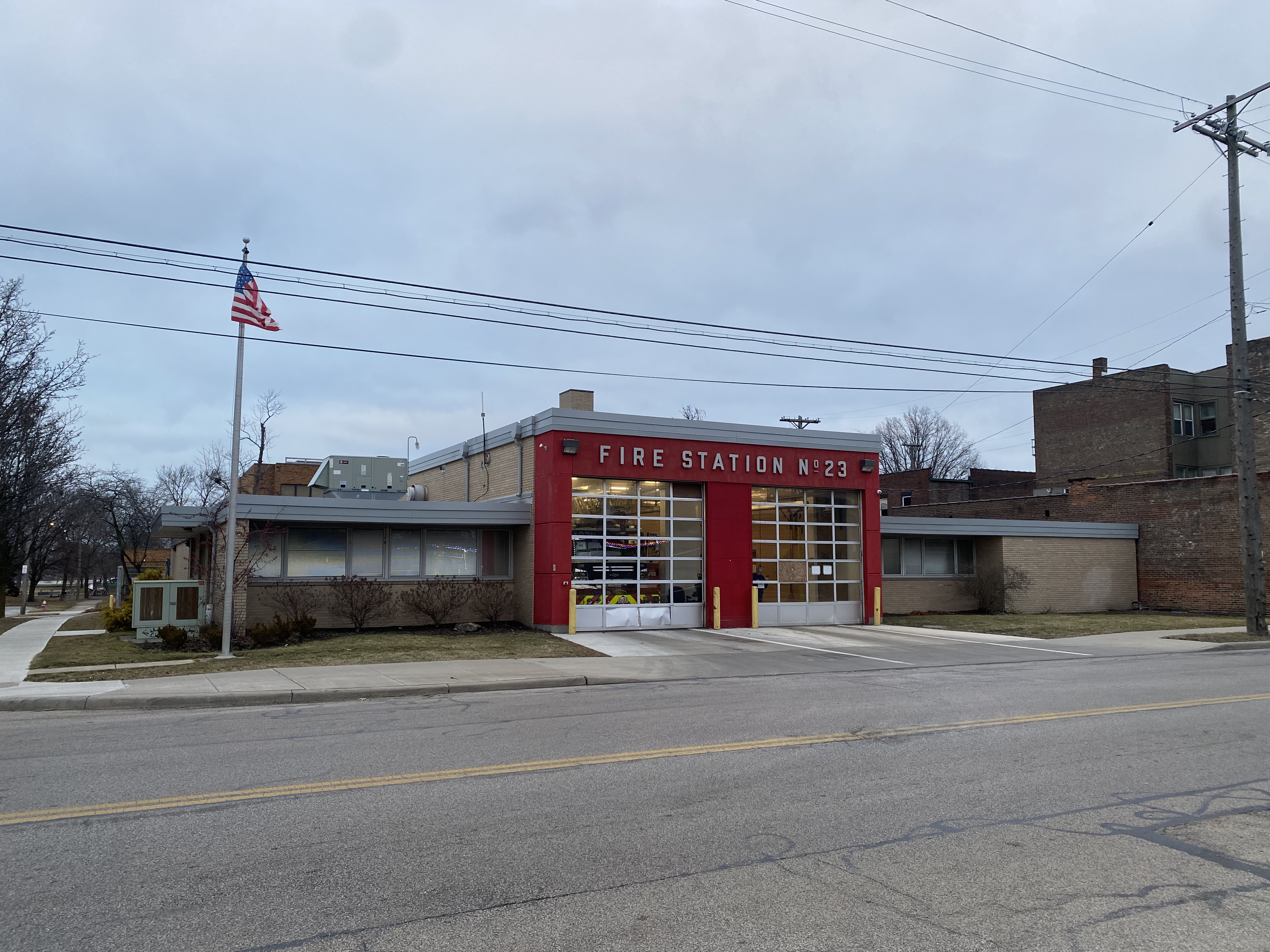
Cleveland Fire Station no. 23, located on Madison Ave. in Cudell.
