= Franklin Castle =

Historic house in Ohio, United States

- Franklin Castle (aka Hannes Tiedemann House)
- U.S. National Register of Historic Places
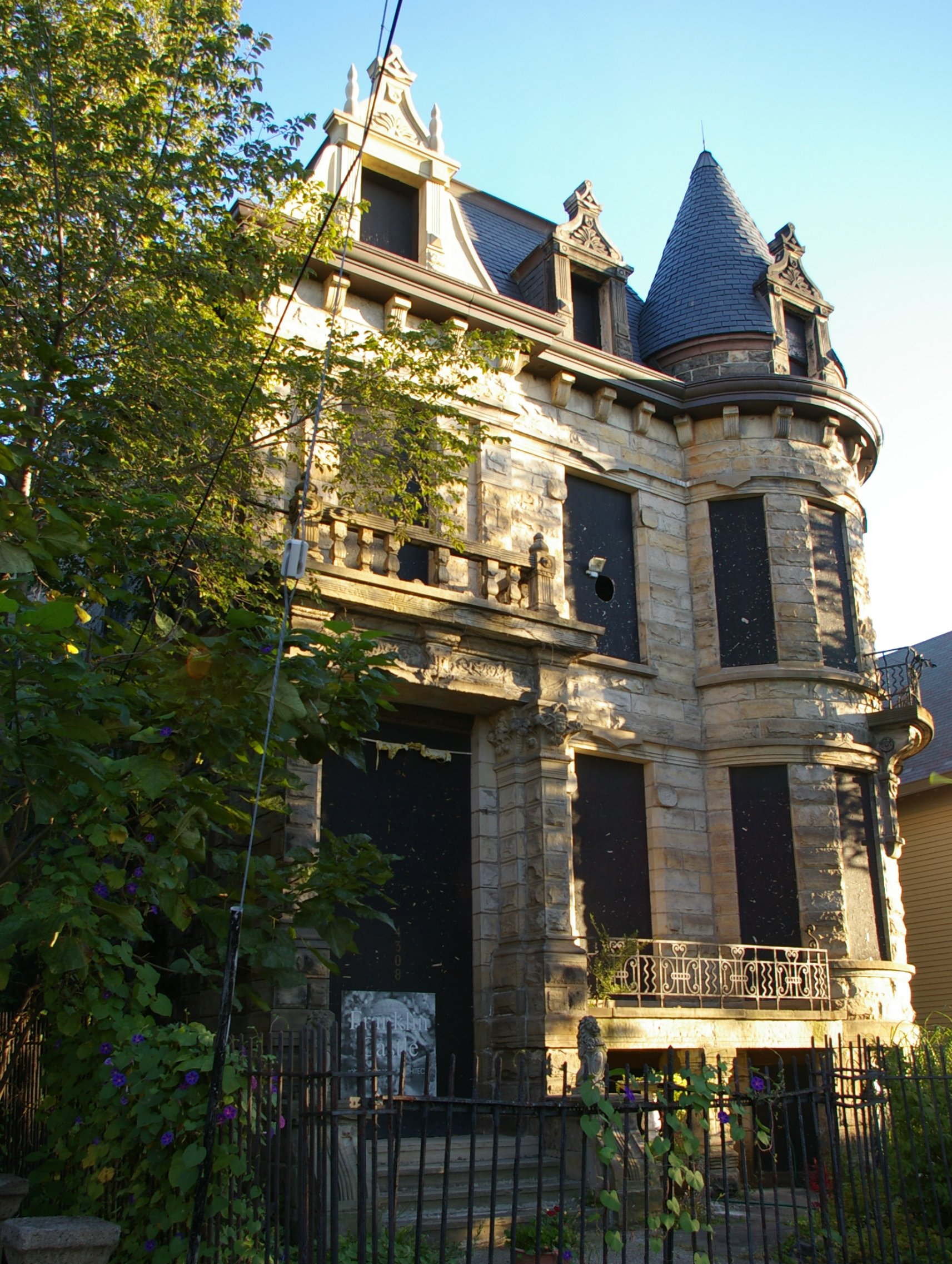

- Location within Cleveland Location within Ohio Location within the United States
- Location: 4308 Franklin Blvd. Ohio City, Cleveland, Ohio; United States
- Coordinates: 41°29′09″N 81°43′00″W
- Built: 1881
- Architect: Cudell & Richardson
- Architectural style: Queen Anne
- NRHP reference No.: 82004417
- Added to NRHP: March 15, 1982

Franklin Castle (also known as the Tiedemann House) is an American Victorian stone house, built in the American Queen Anne style, located at 4308 Franklin Boulevard in Cleveland's Ohio City neighborhood. The building has four stories and more than twenty rooms and eighty windows. In the late nineteenth century, when it was built, Franklin Boulevard was one of the most prestigious residential avenues in Cleveland. It is reported to be the most haunted house in Ohio.

On March 15, 1982, it was added to the National Register of Historic Places.

== Early history ==
The house was built in 1881–1883 by the famed architectural firm of Cudell & Richardson for Hannes Tiedemann, a prosperous German immigrant.

On January 15, 1881, Tiedemann's fifteen-year-old daughter Emma succumbed to diabetes. The property saw its second death not long afterwards when Tiedemann's elderly mother, Wiebeka, died. During the next three years the Tiedemanns would bury three more children, giving rise to speculation about the circumstances of the deaths.

To distract his wife, Louise, from these tragedies, Tiedemann began extensive construction on the home, adding a ballroom which runs the length of the house on the fourth floor of the manor. Also during this building, turrets and gargoyles were added to the edifice's facade, giving the house an even more pronounced "castle" appearance.

It is rumored that hidden rooms and passageways were used for bootlegging during Prohibition. Though rumored, none of these rooms or passageways exist other than a small stairway used by servants from the kitchen to the front door.

Louise Tiedemann died from a liver disease on March 24, 1895, at the age of fifty-seven. The next year, Hannes sold the house to the Mullhauser family, and by 1908 he and the entire Tiedemann family were dead, leaving no one to inherit his considerable personal wealth.

== Middle years ==
Beginning in 1921, the house functioned as a meeting place for two German societies, the German-American League of Culture (which later became the Deutche Socialisten singing club) and later the Bildungsverein Eintracht club. Human bones were found in a closet in 1975 but it's believed they were planted by the new owner looking to gain publicity for his ghost tours of the property.

In 1982, the location was added to the National Register of Historic Places.

In early 1984, Michael DeVinko, Judy Garland's fifth and last husband, purchased Franklin Castle and almost immediately started making major renovations to the house. Over the next ten years, DeVinko spent close to one million dollars renovating the Castle, even going so far as to track down some of the original furnishings for the Castle. Despite all this, DeVinko put the house up for sale in 1994.

== Recent history ==
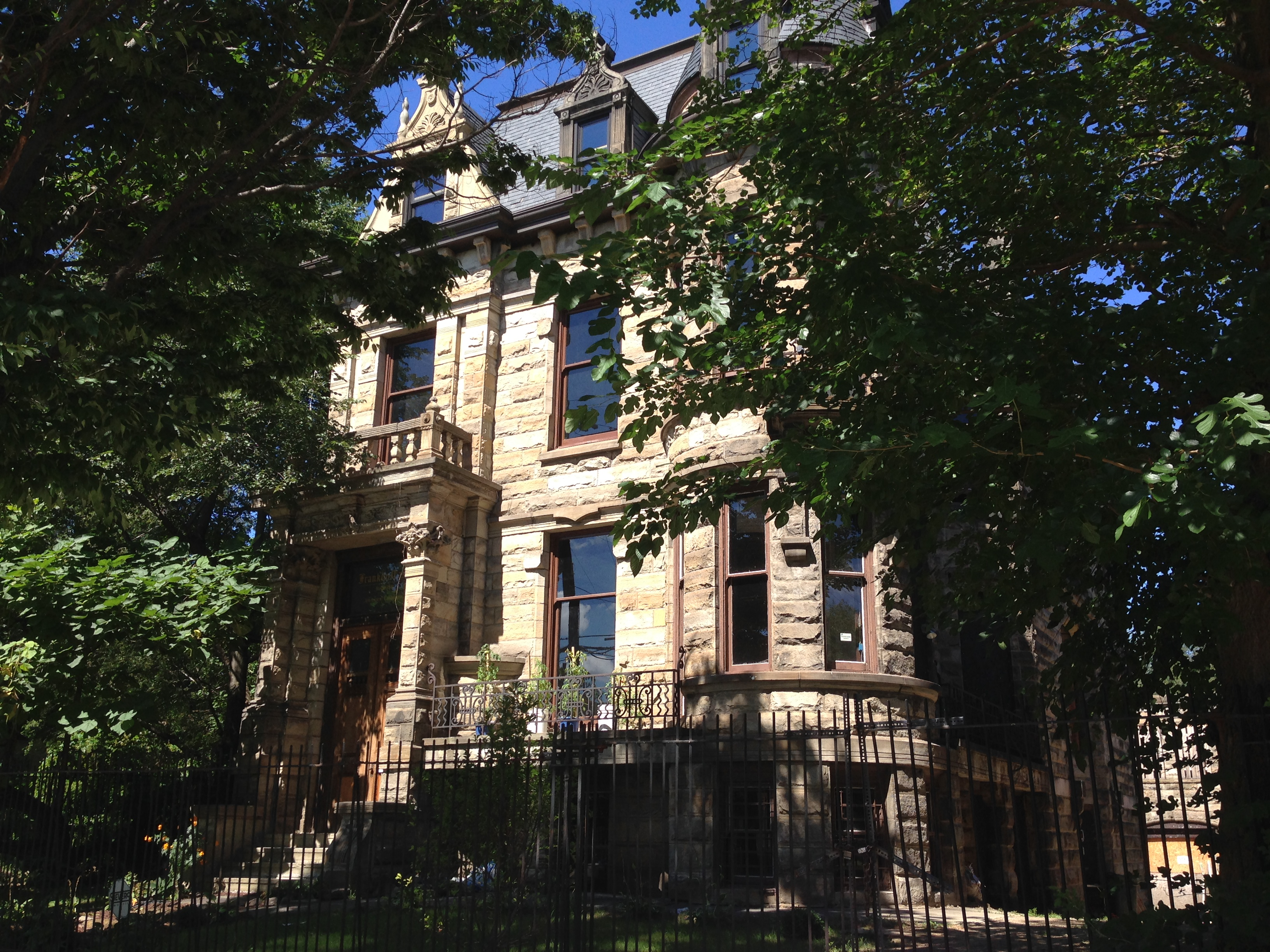
Franklin Castle in 2014

There have been a series of owners in the past thirty years. The castle was empty from 1994 to 1999, when Michelle Heimburger bought the castle and carriage house for $350,000 using part of her Yahoo! stock windfall as one of the company's early employees. A native Clevelander, Heimburger was fascinated with the home and purchased it with intentions of restoring the building to its former glory. That same year, a fire badly damaged the castle. Though extensive repairs were carried out, the house restoration could not be completed.

In 2004 there were rumors that Franklin Castle was going to be completely renovated and turned into the Franklin Castle Club. Around this time, though, the exterior stone of the building was cleaned and the parapet, on the left side of the facade, was rebuilt according to the 19th-century design.

The property was damaged again in March 2011 when the carriage house was damaged in a fire.

It was announced in July 2011 that the Franklin Castle had been rezoned to allow it to become a three-family dwelling, and that a sale was pending.

European tapestry artist Chiara Dona Dalle purchased Franklin Castle in 2011 for $260,000. The Cleveland Building & Housing Department issued a permit for residential exterior alterations in February 2012. Local news sources reported that the buyer intended to convert the building into three family homes and dwelling in two of the spaces.

Following several years of renovations, the owners announced single-night accommodations were available for guests on December 24, 2022.

== Trivia ==
On March 18, 2016, the reality TV series Paranormal Lockdown featured the Franklin Castle in the third episode of its first season.

On March 5, 2020, Franklin Castle was featured on the second episode of Season 23 of Ghost Adventures which aired on the Travel Channel.

On November 19, 2020, Franklin Castle was featured on episode four Season 2 of The Holzer Files which aired on the Travel Channel.
