= St. Joseph's Church and Friary =

Historic church in Ohio, United States

- Formerly listed on the U.S. National Register of Historic Places
- Location within Cleveland Location within Ohio Location within the United States
- Location: 2543 E. 23rd St. at Woodland, Cleveland, Ohio
- Coordinates: 41°29′35″N 81°40′22″W
- Area: 1 acre (0.40 ha)
- Built: 1873
- Architect: Cudell & Richardson
- Architectural style: Gothic
- NRHP reference No.: 76001403

Significant dates
- Added to NRHP: June 17, 1976
- Removed from NRHP: January 31, 1995

St. Joseph's Church and Friary was a historic church at 2543 E. 23rd Street at Woodland in Cleveland, Ohio. It was designed by architects Cudell & Richardson, built in 1873, and added to the National Register of Historic Places in 1976.

The congregation dwindled due to the construction of nearby interstate highways, and the Roman Catholic Diocese of Cleveland closed the church in 1986. It was later deconsecrated. The friary and school suffered moderate damage on January 25, 1993, after a fire set by homeless people who sought shelter in the building got out of control. A second, much more severe fire (whether set by homeless individuals or vandals was unclear) occurred inside the church itself on February 15, 1993. A third fire on February 19, 1993, destroyed the remainder of the structure. The church was demolished on February 20.

Prior to the fires, the stained glass windows, artwork, and most of the other useful items at St. Joseph's Church and Friary had been removed and given to other Catholic Churches for use.
