= Hannes Tiedemann =

Hannes Tiedemann (April 13, 1832 – January 19, 1908) was an American banker who became president and co-founder of Union Banking & Savings Co. of Cleveland, Ohio, after immigrating to the United States from the Kingdom of Prussia.

Tiedemann is most known for his commission of the historic Franklin Castle (aka "Hannes Tiedemann House" or "Tiedemann House") in 1881. The property has been notoriously catalogued as one of the top fifty most haunted houses in America, and one of the most haunted sites in Ohio.

== Early years ==
Tiedemann was born in Prussia to Hans Tiedemann and Wiebka (also spelled Wiebeka) Mohr. After his father died in 1846, Hannes emigrated to New York in 1848 with his mother, his brothers, Claus and Ludwig, and his sisters, Catharina, Rebecca Eliese, and Lowiese.

== Businesses ==
By 1850, Tiedemann worked as an apprentice to a barrel maker in Parma, Ohio. He moved to Cleveland in 1854 and worked as a clerk for Babcock, Hurd & Co., a wholesale grocer, and resided at Bennett Forest City House, a rooming house at Cleveland's Public Square. In 1864, Tiedemann was a wholesale grocer in the firm of Weidemann & Tiedemann, having begun the business with John Christian Weiderman. In 1871, Tiedemann sold out his interests in Weideman & Tiedemann, though he retained business offices within its building. In 1883, Tiedemann founded and was Vice-President of Savings & Trust Co., newly permitted at that time by Ohio state law to form as a trust company. In January 1907, he retired from United Savings and Banking Co. of Cleveland, where he had become president, following his involvement in many Cleveland area banks.

== Personal life ==
In 1862, Tiedemann married Luisa (also referred to as Louise or Louisa) Höck (also spelled Hook or Hoeck), and they had several children together.

Luisa died in 1895 to liver failure, leaving Tiedemann a widower. He remarried in 1896 to a woman named Henriette, and the two remained married until Tiedemann's death.

On January 19, 1908, Tiedemann died of arteriosclerosis at his home on Lakewood Avenue. Surviving him were his wife, Henriette, and his many grandchildren. Despite this, urban legends state that Tiedemann died following a massive stroke suffered during a walk in a park, and that he outlived all his family members, leaving no one to inherit his wealth.

== Franklin Castle ("Tiedemann House") and Stone Castle ==
In late 1880, Tiedemann built two houses. Although it was named "Stone Castle", the first house was not constructed of stone and did not resemble a castle either. It was built in the popular half-timbered Tudor-revival style of the time.

His second home, also known as the "Franklin Castle", was named after the road on which it was built.
