= West Boulevard–Cudell station =

Rapid transit station in Cleveland

West Boulevard
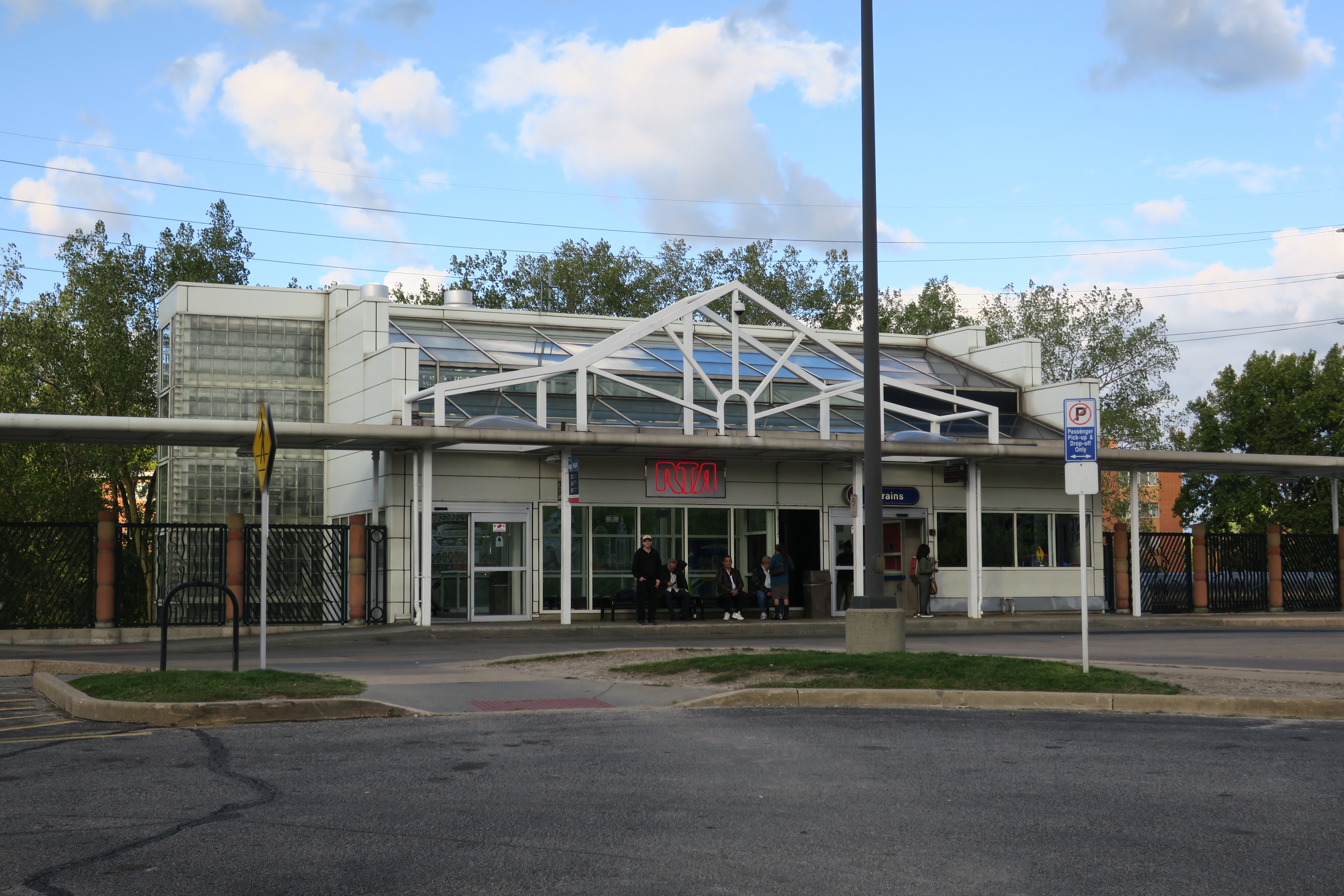
- West Boulevard–Cudell station house

General information
- Location: 10120 Detroit Avenue; Cleveland, Ohio
- Coordinates: 41°28′49″N 81°45′11″W
- Owner: Greater Cleveland Regional Transit Authority
- Line: NS Lake Erie District
- Platforms: 1 island platform
- Tracks: 2
- Connections: RTA: 18, 26, 26A

Construction
- Structure type: Below-grade
- Parking: 112 spaces
- Cycle facilities: Racks
- Accessible: Yes

Other information
- Website: riderta.com/facilities/westblvdcudell

History
- Opened: August 14, 1955; 71 years ago
- Rebuilt: 1999
- Former names: Detroit–West 98th
- Original company: Cleveland Transit System

Services
| Preceding station | Rapid Transit | Following station |
|---|---|---|
| West 117th–Madison toward Airport | Red Line | West 65th–Lorain toward Windermere |
Location

West Boulevard–Cudell station (signed as West Boulevard) is a station on the RTA Red Line in Cleveland, Ohio. The station is located on the north side of Detroit Avenue (U.S. Route 6 Alternate) at the intersection with West Boulevard in Cleveland's Cudell neighborhood.

The station comprises a parking lot off Detroit Avenue with a station headhouse on the north side of the parking lot. The tracks and platform are located below the parking lot level. An enclosed bridge from the headhouse over the eastbound track leads to a stairway to the platform below.

Just west of the station, the Red Line leaves the right-of-way adjacent to the old Nickel Plate Road and goes through a cut to run southwest adjacent to the old New York Central main line.

== History ==
The station opened when the CTS Rapid Transit opened on Cleveland's West Side on August 14, 1955, and was originally named West 98th–Detroit. In April 1999, RTA completed a $5.5-million reconstruction of the station. The station was renamed “West Boulevard–Cudell” to reflect the Cudell neighborhood in which it is located.

== Notable places nearby ==
- Cudell Commons
  - Shooting of Tamir Rice

== Gallery ==
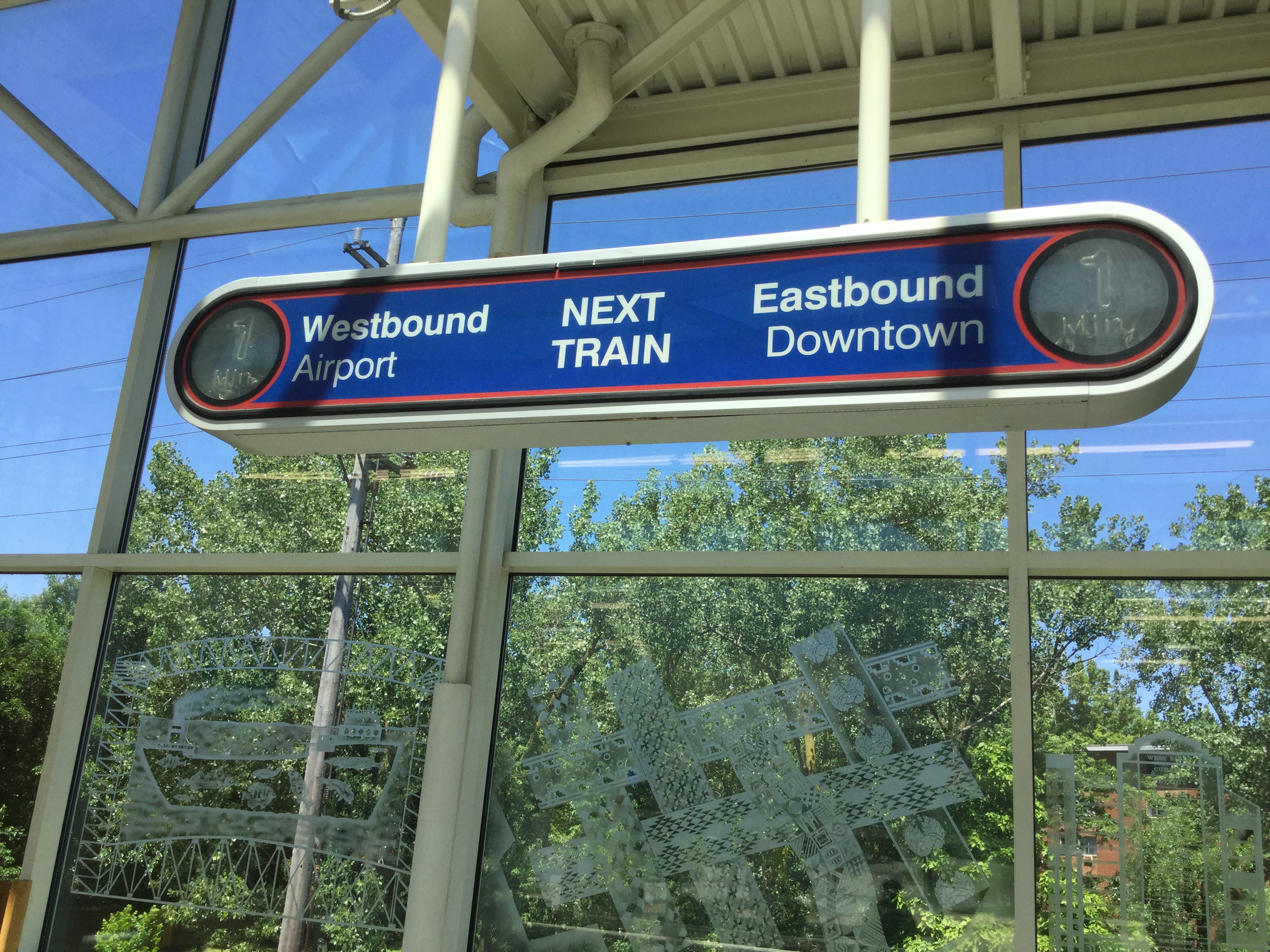

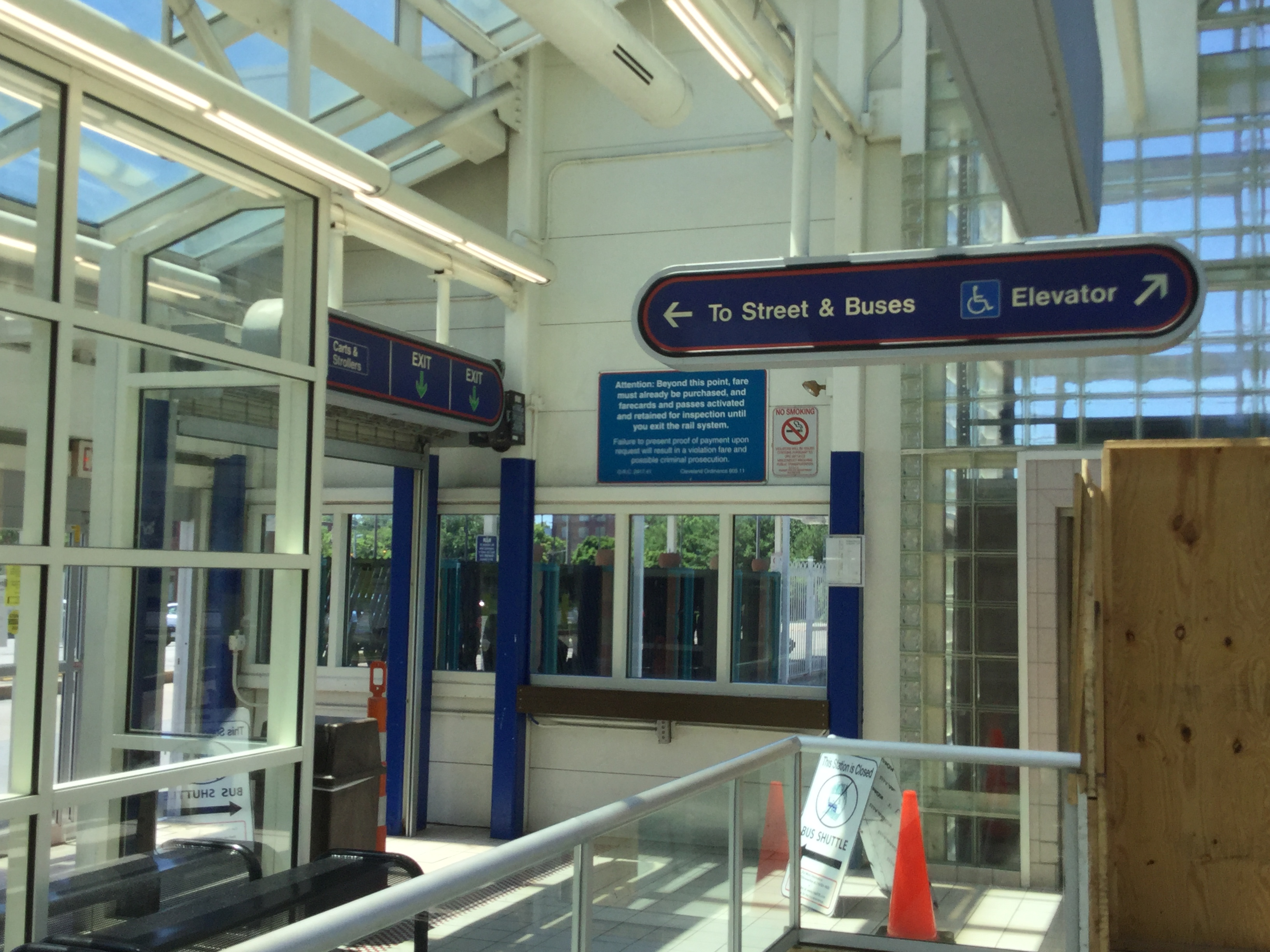

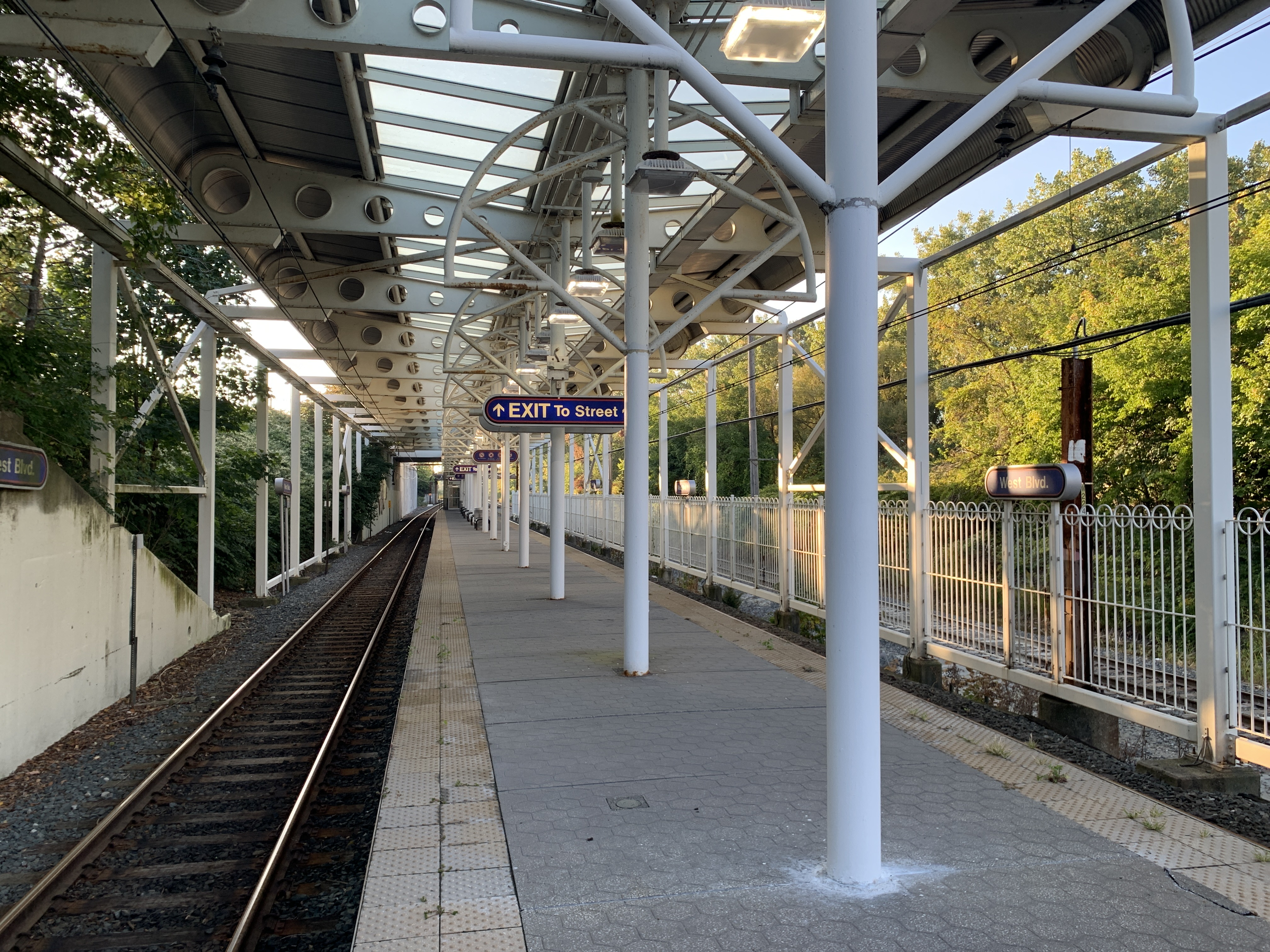

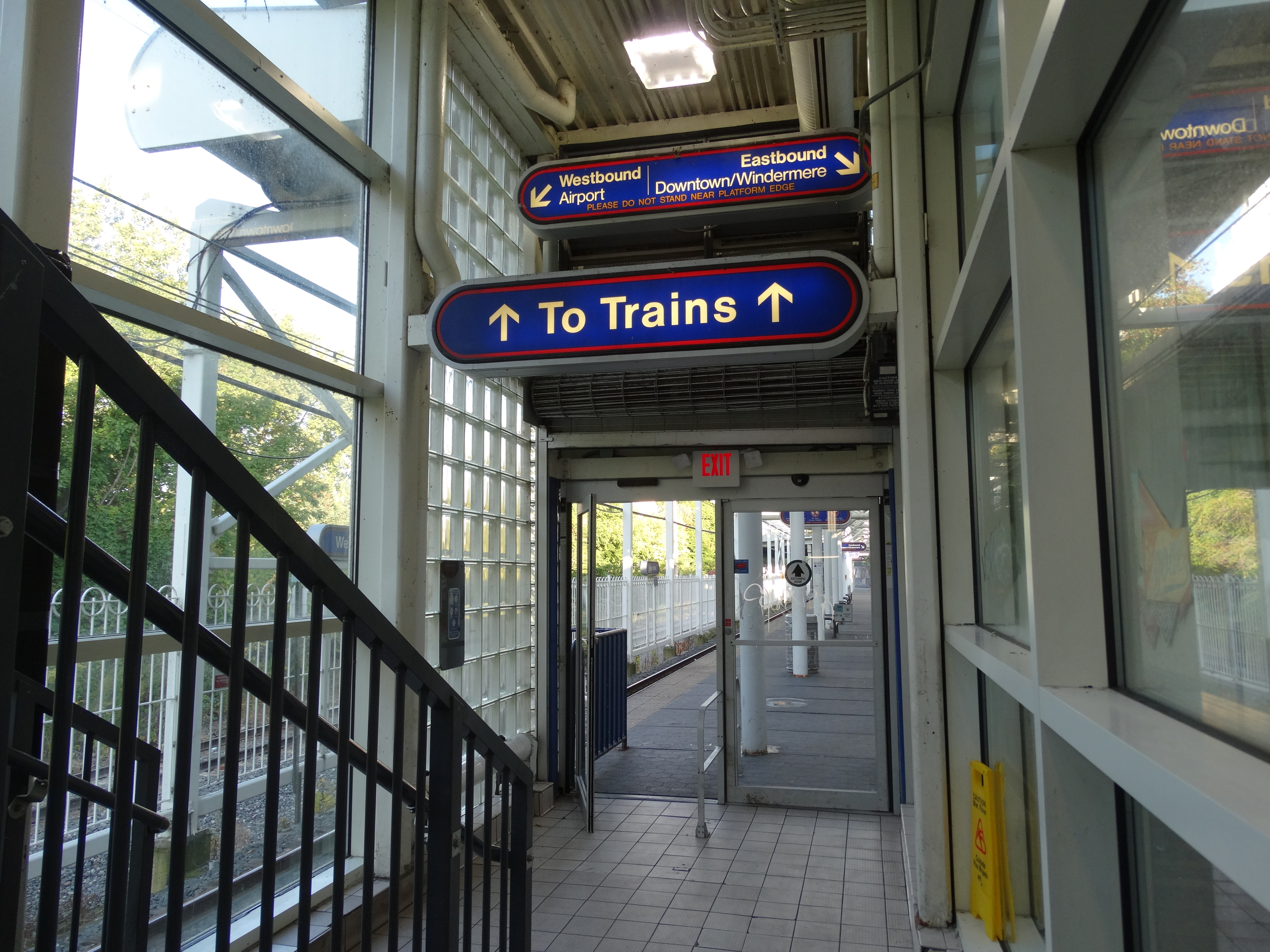
