= Bradley Building =

Coordinates: 41°30′3.2″N 81°42′0.24″W

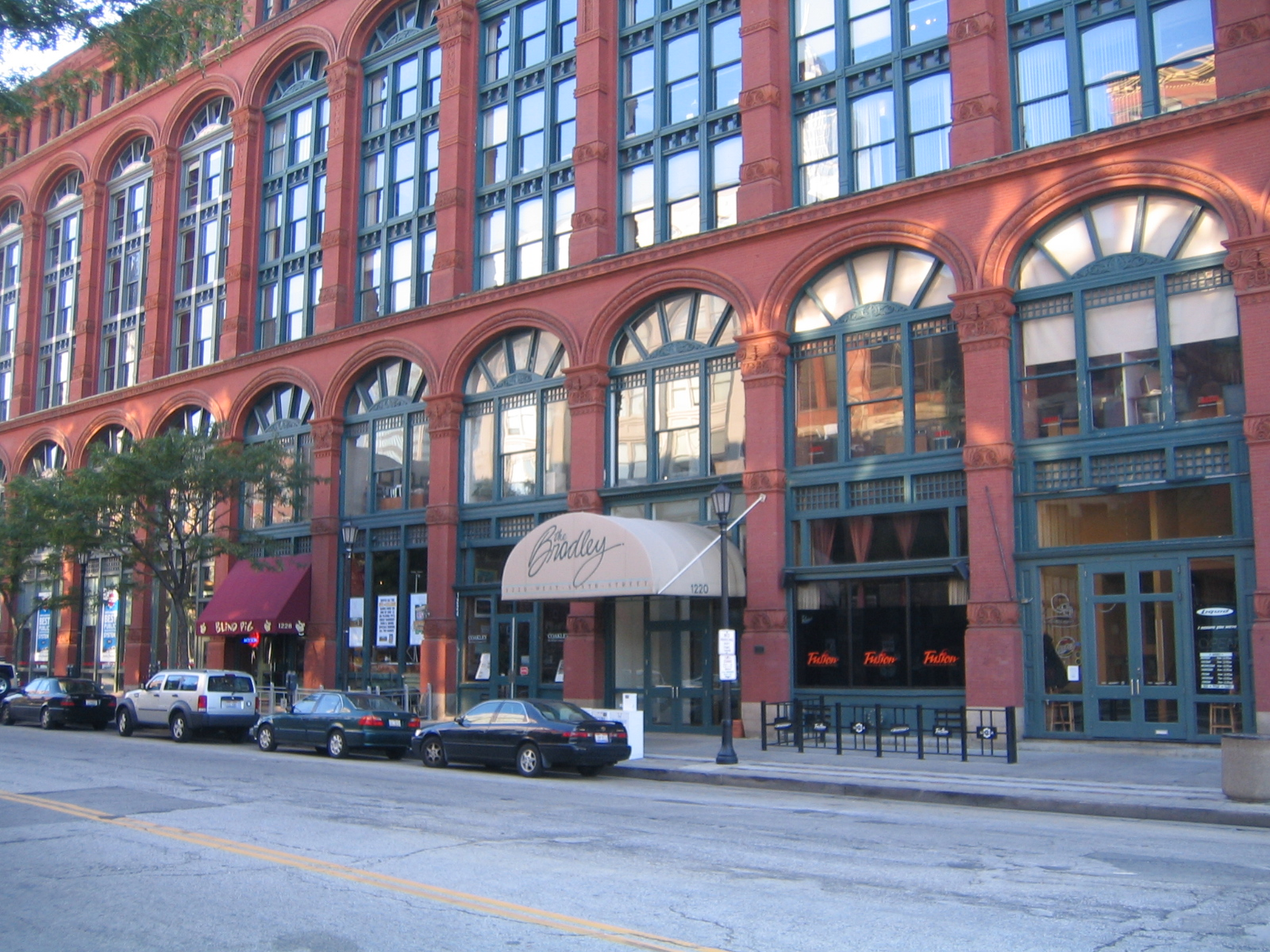
Bradley Building

The Bradley Building is a mid rise building in Cleveland, Ohio. Completed in 1887 by Cudell & Richardson, the building has eight stories and rises to a height of 128 feet, and is a product of the Chicago school of architecture. It is most notable for being the first building between New York and Chicago to be designated for multi-use. The building has since served as a model for the conversion of historic buildings throughout the city. In 1980, it was added to the National Register of Historic Places. It was originally named the Root-McBride Building, but was later renamed the Bradley Building.
