= Cudell & Richardson =

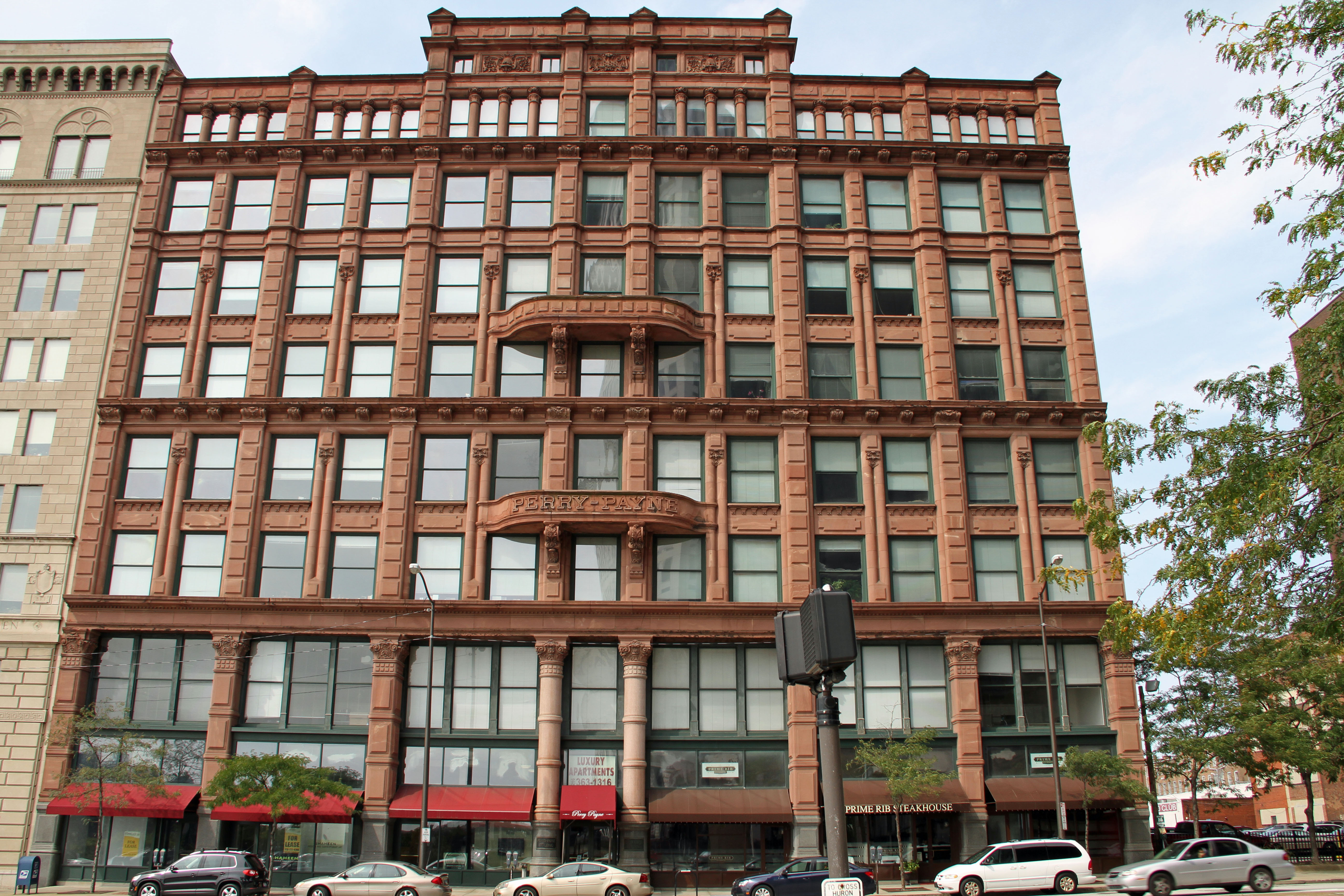
The Perry-Payne Building in Cleveland's Warehouse District

Cudell & Richardson was an architecture partnership of Frank E. Cudell (1844-1916) and John N. Richardson (1837-1902) active from 1871 to 1890. The Cleveland, Ohio-based firm designed numerous commercial buildings and churches. A number of these are listed on the U.S. National Register of Historic Places.

Works include:

- Perry-Payne Building, 740 Superior Ave. Cleveland, Ohio, NRHP-listed
- Root and McBride-Bradley Building, 1220-1230 W. 6th St. Cleveland, Ohio, NRHP-listed
- St. John the Baptist Roman Catholic Church, OH 694 and Main St. Glandorf, Ohio, NRHP-listed
- St. Joseph's Church and Friary, 2543 E. 23rd St. at Woodland Cleveland, Ohio, NRHP-listed
- St. Michael Catholic Church Complex, OH 705 east of OH 66 Fort Loramie, Ohio, NRHP-listed
- St. Stephen Church, 1930 W. 54th St. Cleveland, Ohio, NRHP-listed
- Hannes Tiedemann House, 4308 Franklin Blvd. Cleveland, Ohio, NRHP-listed
- Bradley Building, Cleveland, Ohio
- Franklin Circle Christian Church, Cleveland, Ohio
- St. Joseph Catholic Church, Cleveland, Ohio
- George Worthington Building, Cleveland, Ohio
