= St. Stephen's Catholic Church (Cleveland) =

Historic church in Ohio, United States

- St. Stephen Church
- U.S. National Register of Historic Places
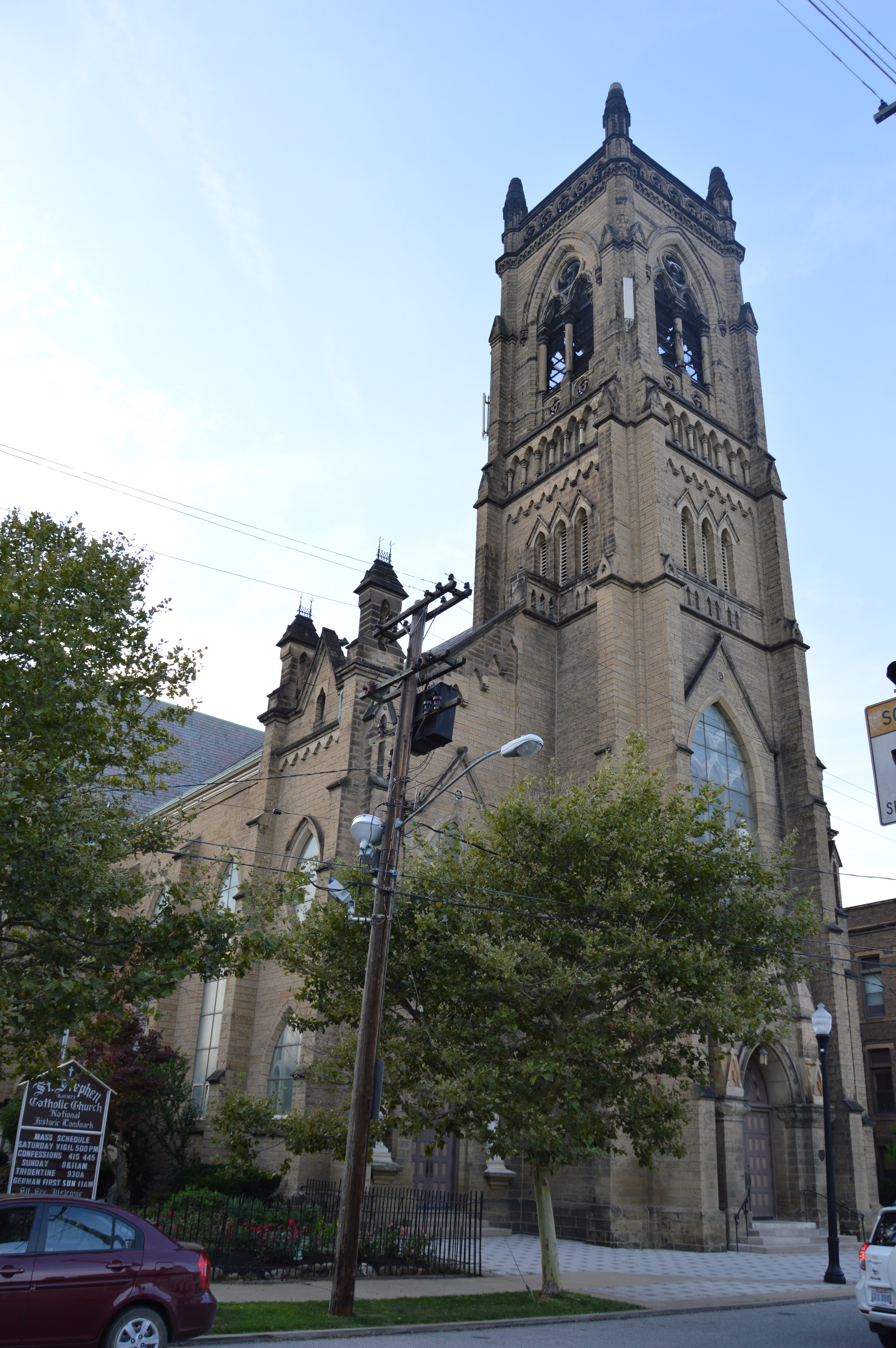
- Front view of the Church

- Location within Cleveland Location within Ohio Location within the United States
- Location: 1930 W. 54th St., Cleveland, Ohio
- Coordinates: 41°28′44″N 81°43′27″W
- Area: less than one acre
- Built: 1875
- Architect: Cudell & Richardson
- Architectural style: Gothic
- NRHP reference No.: 77001052
- Added to NRHP: November 25, 1977

St. Stephen Church is a Roman Catholic church located in the Detroit-Shoreway neighborhood on the west side of Cleveland, Ohio. The gothic style building was designed by architects Cudell & Richardson. The current church was built in 1875 and was added into the National Register of Historic Places in 1977.

== History ==
St. Stephen Roman Catholic Church was founded in 1869 due to a need for a second German parish on the west side of Cleveland. The first German parish, St. Mary's, increased so much that Cleveland was in need of a second parish for German-speaking Catholics. In April 1869 the first bishop of Cleveland, Bishop Louis Amadeus Rappe, appointed Fr. Stephen Falk to have a two-story building built. The building would be used as a church on the upper level and a school on the lower level to accommodate the 200 families from St. Mary's that lived west of 44th Street.

The newly ordained Fr. Casimir Reichlin became the first pastor and said the first Mass of the parish on May 1, 1870. He served as pastor of St. Stephen's for 38 years. In 1873, Fr. Reichlin realized that a new church building was needed to accommodate the growing parish. The Cleveland-based architect firm called Cudell & Richardson was hired to build the structure that still stands today as St. Stephen's Roman Catholic Church. Due to economic depression in the mid-1870s, work on the new building was stopped. Parishioners mortgaged their own properties to raise funds for the new church. It was dedicated on November 20, 1881, by the second bishop of Cleveland, Rev. Richard Gilmour. Volunteer German and Hungarian woodworkers completed the interior of the church.

Over the next 40 years, the parish added a rectory, convent for the Sisters of Notre Dame and two school buildings including one for and an all girls two-year high school which opened in 1905. After World War II, St. Stephen's parish experienced unprecedented growth due to the population growth in Cleveland and throughout the country. On June 8, 1953 a tornado severely damaged the church structure. Work to restore the building began immediately. The church was reopened on November 6, 1953. In the late sixties, the parish enrollment was at a low due to migration of families to suburban towns. St. Stephen's parish graduated its last high school class in 1970 and the following school year moved the elementary level classes into the old high school building. In 1986, St. Stephen School combined with St. Michael and St. Boniface Schools and formed Metro Catholic School. St. Stephen's was listed on the National Register of Historic Places on November 11, 1977. In the 2010 round of parish closings in Cleveland, Ohio due to an unfortunate shortage of priests in the diocese, Bishop Richard Lennon spared St. Stephen's because of its historical significance.

== Architecture ==
The church building is made entirely of stone, mainly Amherst stone, by Cudell & Richardson Architect firm. The church is 165 long and 74 feet wide. The architect style is Gothic and the shape of the church is cruciform. On each side of the main altar are six enormous wooden pillars that branch out into many columns. The high altar, side altars and pulpit are made entirely of oak wood and decorated with beautiful German woodcarvings. The church pews are also oak. A Mexican onyx and brass Communion rail was installed over the years and the floor of the sanctuary and aisles is made of black and white marble tiles.

== Contemporary life ==
St. Stephen's is a fully active Roman Catholic Parish in the Diocese of Cleveland. This means that they have a full parish staff and church council. They have regular Sunday Masses as well as daily Masses. German Mass is offered every first Sunday at 11am. In addition to German and English Masses, St. Stephen's also offers Tridentine Latin Masses every Sunday at 9:30am as well as daily Tridentine Latin Masses at varying times.

St. Stephen's hosts many church events and fund raisers as well as promotes those of other local parishes. St. Stephen's also promotes pro-life events as well as home school events. In keeping with its German tradition, one of the many cultural activities that is offered at St. Stephen's is a German summer camp. This summer camp allows children to be introduced to the German language in a fun setting through crafts, games, and scavenger hunts. The summer camp requires no prior knowledge of the German language. The parish observes “Priesthood Sunday” to celebrate the gift of the holy priesthood in the life of the Catholic Church and encourages parishioners to pray for and submit a note of appreciation to numerous priests.
