= Euclid–East 120th station =

Euclid–E. 120th
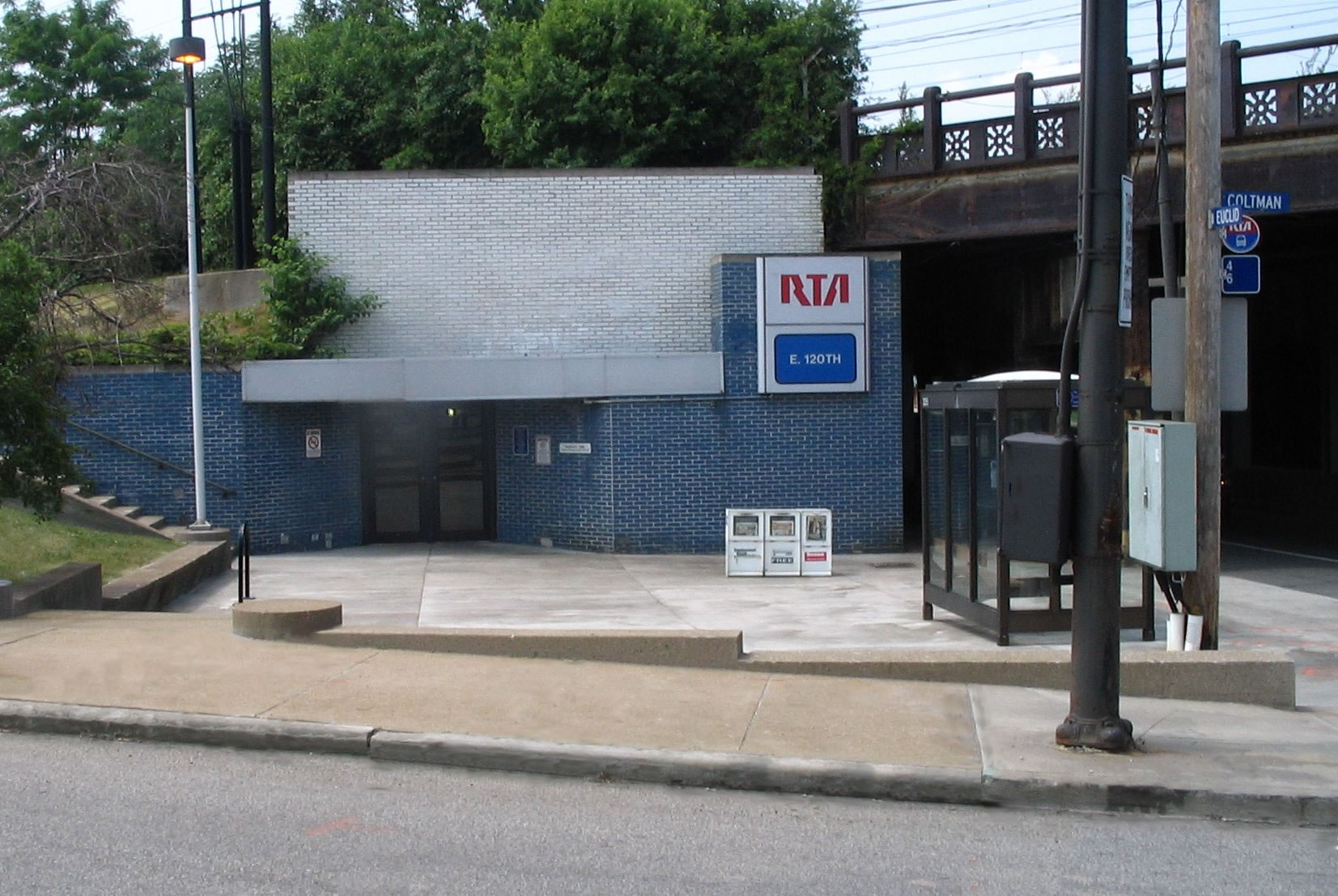

General information
- Location: 12000 Euclid Avenue; Cleveland, Ohio
- Coordinates: 41°30′45″N 81°36′2″W
- Owner: Greater Cleveland Regional Transit Authority
- Lines: Lake Erie District (Norfolk Southern); Cleveland Short Line Sub. (CSX)
- Platforms: 1 island platform
- Tracks: 2

Construction
- Structure type: Embankment
- Parking: None

Other information
- Website: East 120th page archive

History
- Opened: March 15, 1955
- Closed: August 11, 2015
- Original company: Cleveland Transit System

Former services
Preceding station	Rapid Transit	Following station
Cedar–University toward Airport	Red Line	Superior toward Windermere
Location

Euclid–East 120th (signed as East 120th) was a station on the RTA Red Line in the University Circle neighborhood of Cleveland, Ohio. It was located at the Euclid Avenue (U.S. Route 20) and Coltman Road intersection, near the western end of Lake View Cemetery. At the end of service on August 11, 2015, it became the first, and thus far only, station in the history of the RTA to permanently close.

== History ==
The station was near the site of a pre-1930 Nickel Plate railroad station. The lobby building of the railroad station was located on the other side of the tracks along the south side of Euclid Avenue. That railway station was removed as part of the Cleveland Union Terminal project and replaced by the East Cleveland station adjacent to today's Superior Rapid Transit station.

When the Cleveland Transit System Rapid Transit was constructed in the early 1950s, it used the original right-of-way laid out for the Van Sweringen brothers' rapid transit system in 1928. The original right-of-way included passenger tunnels and stairways at Mayfield Road (U.S. Route 322), but CTS decided not to place a station there because the buses running on Mayfield Road were those of Redifer Bus Co., not CTS, and CTS did not want to provide an interconnection for a competing bus line. Therefore, the Mayfield station was eliminated in favor of the Euclid–East 120th station. The station opened with the opening of the CTS Rapid Transit on the east side on March 15, 1955.

When originally opened, the entrance to the station along Euclid Avenue was in the middle of the railroad bridge over the street. The station was not very visible, and this may have contributed to its disuse. A further tunnel was constructed under the tracks to provide a more visible entrance at the east side of the bridge.

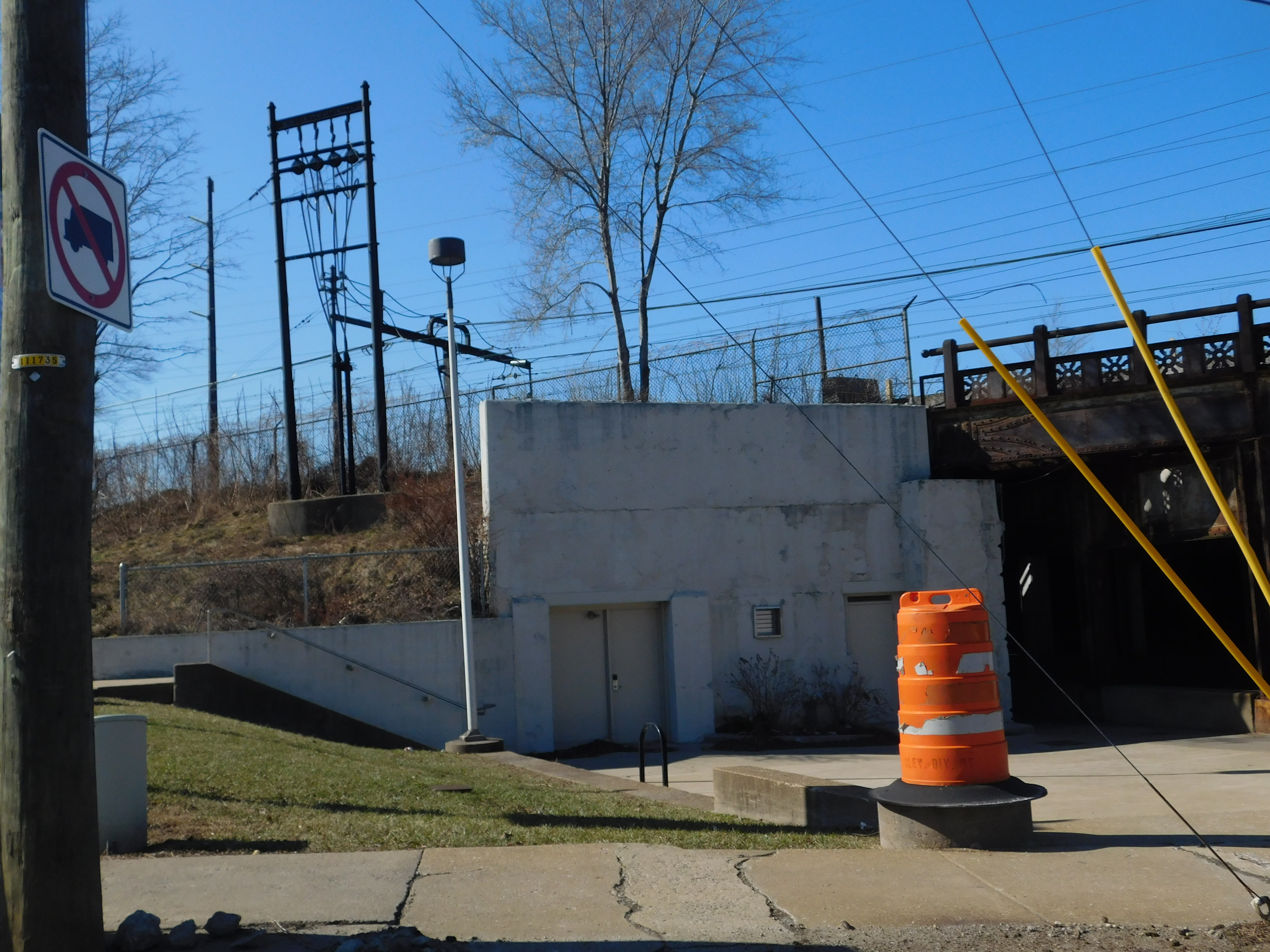
The former Euclid–East 120th station headhouse in February 2020

As ridership on the rapid transit system declined, RTA examined the economic viability of maintaining stations that had minimal rider counts. As few as 70 people a day used Euclid–East 120th station, making it the least used station on the system, and a policy was proposed to allow closing the station. The Plain Dealer endorsed the station closing as part of an overall program to control costs on the rapid transit system. Despite protests from city and union officials, RTA adopted the policy. However, opposition to closing the station increased, and the station remained open.

In September 2007, RTA announced plans to relocate the station to Mayfield Road, approximately 0.3 miles (0.48 km) south. Originally the station was to be completed in 2010 at a cost of $9 million, but a lack of federal funding postponed the project. On December 14, 2011, RTA was awarded $12.5 million in grant money from the U.S. Department of Transportation, via the Federal Transit Administration. Construction on the new station began in October 2013 and on August 11, 2015, the Little Italy–University Circle station opened. That same day, the Euclid–East 120th station closed.

== Notable places nearby ==
- Lake View Cemetery
- Little Italy
- Case Western Reserve University (northern campus)
- Wade Memorial Chapel
- DiSanto Field
- Cleveland Institute of Art
