= Berea Union Depot =

Railway station in Berea, Ohio

Berea
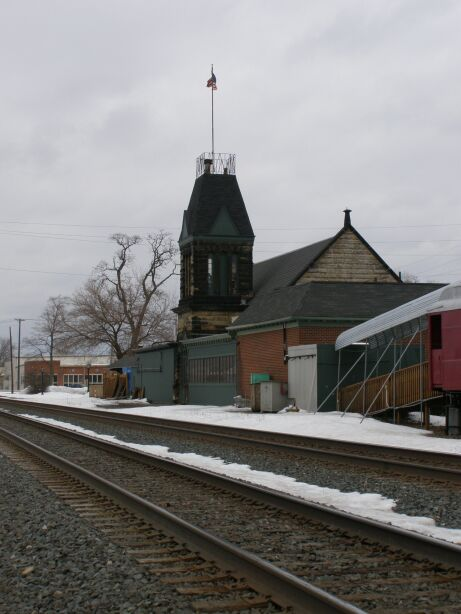

General information
- Location: 30 Depot Street; Berea, Ohio 44017
- Coordinates: 41.3810°N 81.8545°W
- Operator: Cleveland, Columbus, Cincinnati and Indianapolis Railway (1876 – 1889); Lake Shore & Michigan Southern Railway (1876 – 1914); Cleveland, Cincinnati, Chicago and St. Louis Railway (1889 – 1930); New York Central (1914 – 1954)
- Tracks: 5 (current)

Other information
- Website: https://www.bereadepot.com

History
- Opened: 1876
- Closed: 1954

Former services
Preceding station	New York Central Railroad	Following station
Olmsted Falls toward Chicago	Main Line	Linndale toward New York
Terminus	Old Main Line	West Park toward Nottingham
Galion toward St. Louis	Big Four Route Main Line	Linndale toward Cleveland
West View toward St. Louis	Big Four Route Main Line	Linndale toward Cleveland
West View toward Cincinnati	Cincinnati – Cleveland	Linndale toward Cleveland
- Berea Union Depot
- U.S. National Register of Historic Places
- Location within Ohio Location within the United States
- Location: 30 Depot St., Berea, Ohio
- Coordinates: 41°22′52″N 81°51′16″W
- Area: less than one acre
- Built: 1876
- Architectural style: Gothic
- NRHP reference No.: 80002976
- Added to NRHP: November 21, 1980
Location

The Berea Union Depot is a train station in Berea, Ohio, United States, which was built in 1876. As the railroad facilities through town grew, there was a demand in the early 1870s by developers and townspeople for a new passenger and freight station. When it was dedicated on May 3, 1876, The Plain Dealer called it "the finest facility outside the big cities." It opened simultaneously with Berea's street railway, which offered service directly to the depot. As a union station, it served the Lake Shore and Michigan Southern Railway and the Cleveland, Cincinnati, Chicago and St. Louis Railway, both of which became part of New York Central Railroad. It ceased to serve as a railway depot in 1954. In 1980, the building was restored as a restaurant and gathering place.

Built of sandstone with elements of slate, the depot is a Gothic Revival structure with Victorian-influenced components. Both the sandstone and the styling are uncommon in northeastern Ohio, where masonry depots were typically brick, and where wooden stations outnumbered masonry.

Critical to the station's establishment was Berea's stone-based economy; in the late nineteenth century, the city's sandstone quarries were the world's largest, and a typical day in the 1880s saw eighteen trains at the station. One century later, the depot was named a historic site: it was added to the National Register of Historic Places in November 1980, qualifying because of its place in local history and because of its historically significant architecture.

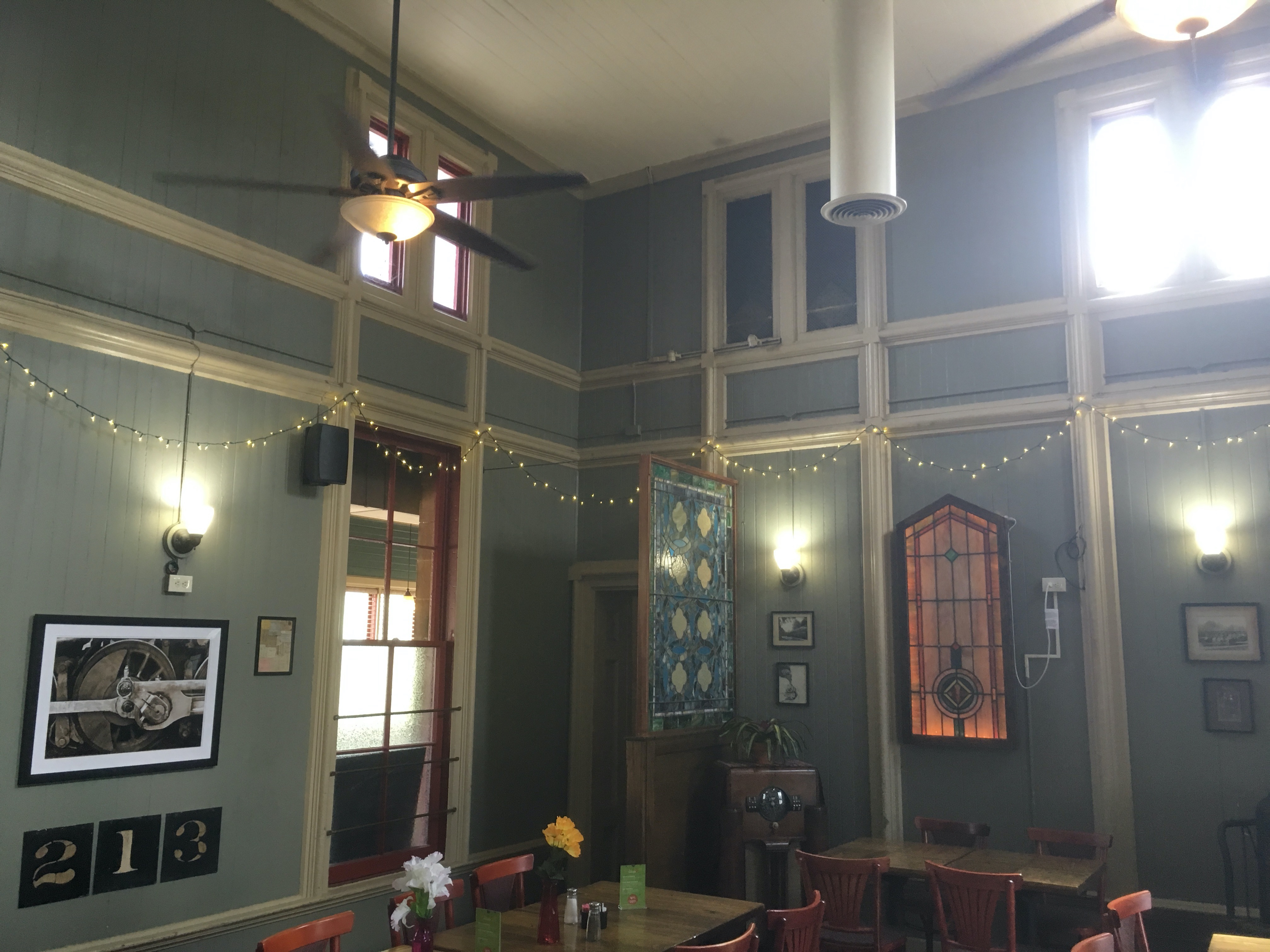

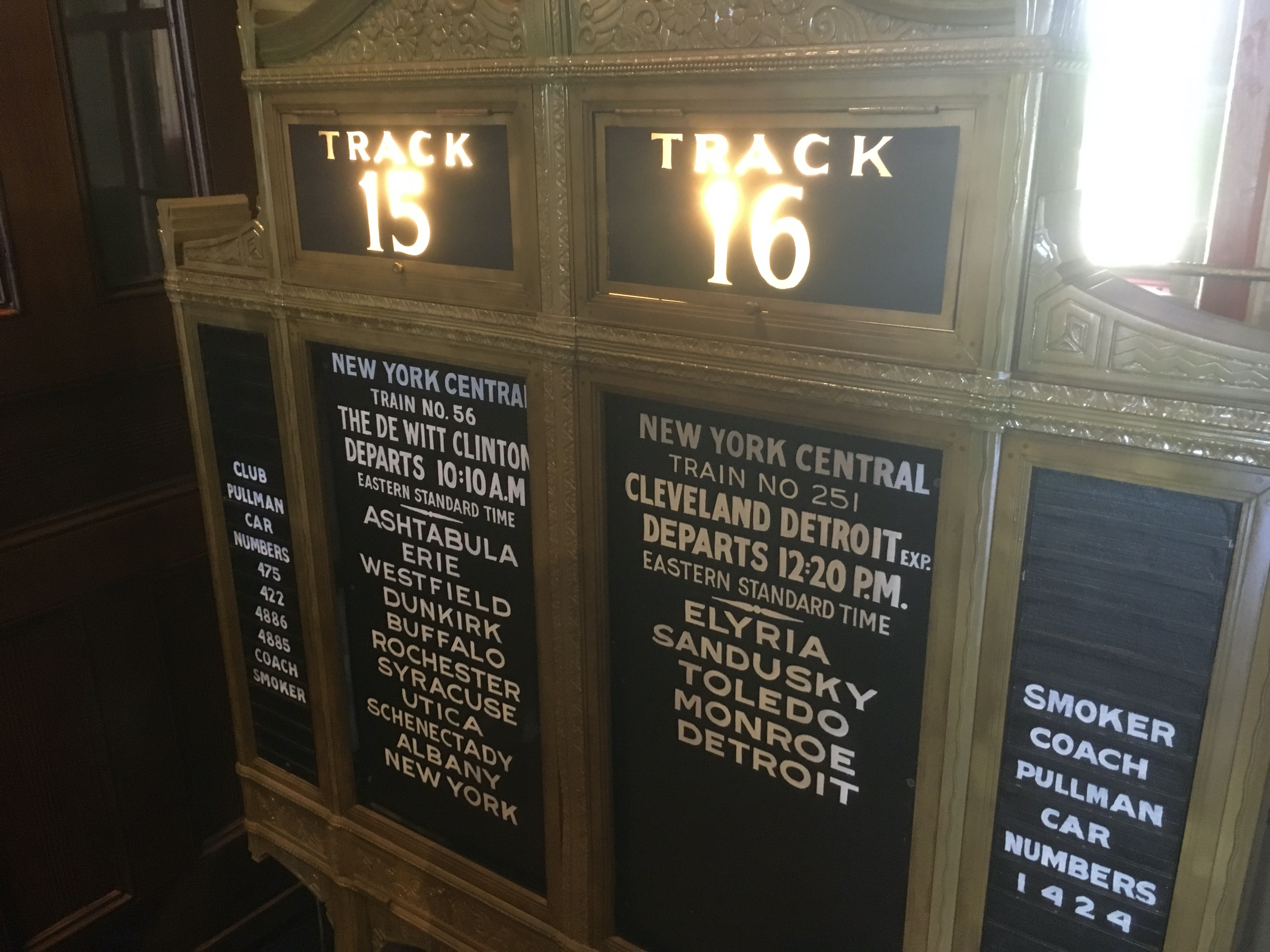
Platform sign originally from Cleveland Union Terminal

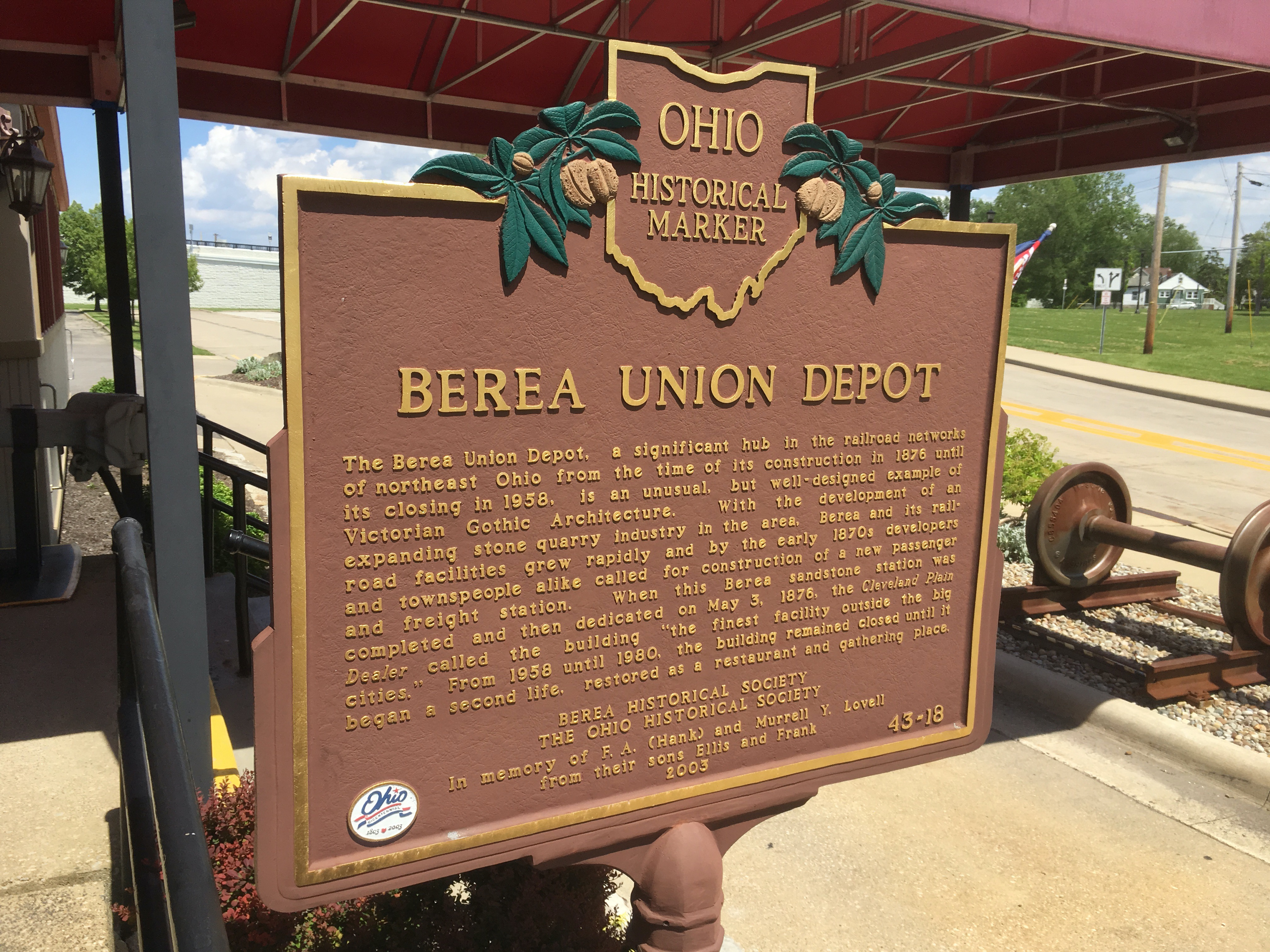
