= Superior station =

Rapid transit station in Cleveland

Superior
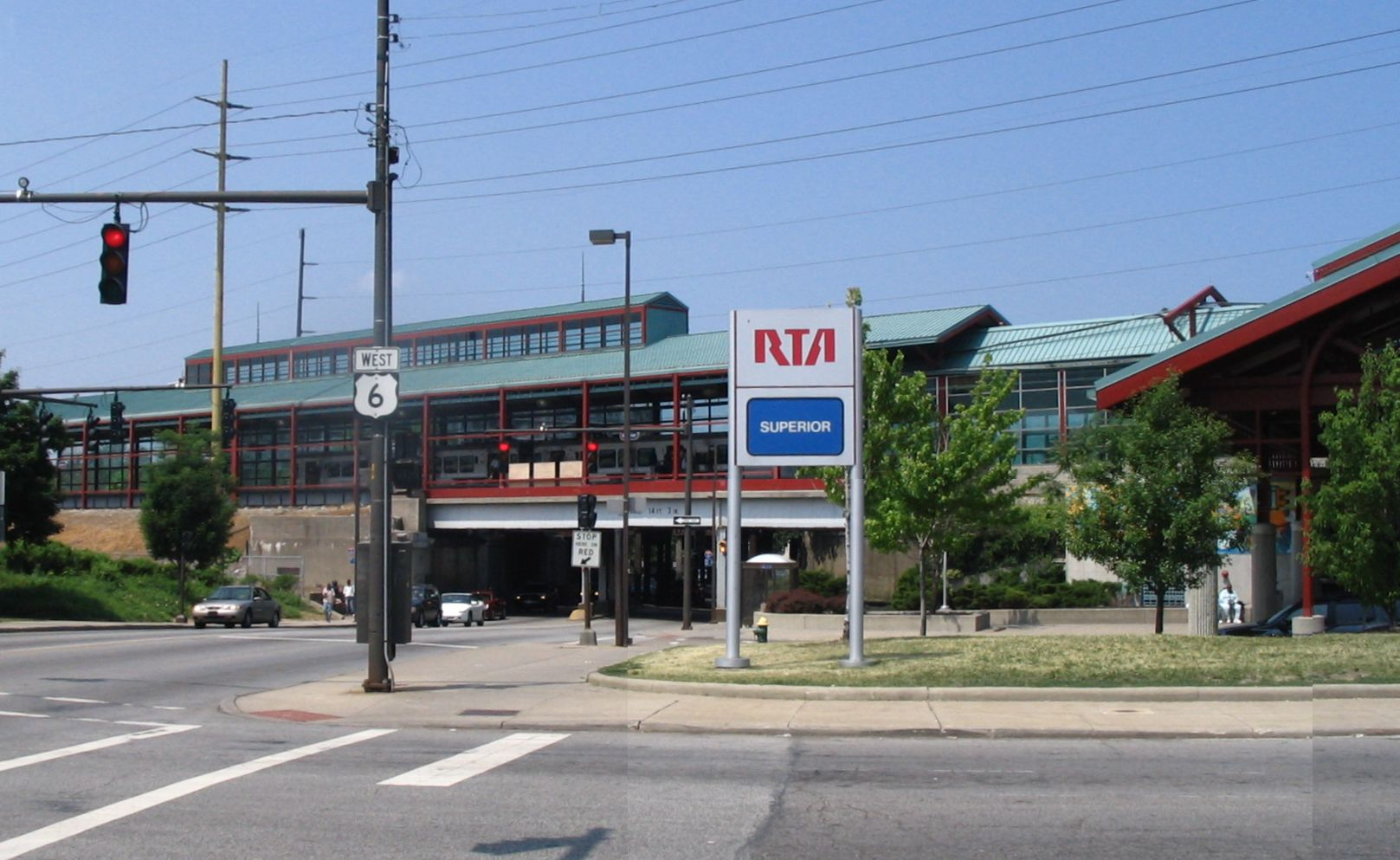

General information
- Location: 13113 Superior Avenue; East Cleveland, Ohio
- Coordinates: 41°31′23″N 81°35′32″W
- Owner: Greater Cleveland Regional Transit Authority
- Lines: NS Lake Erie District; CSX Cleveland Short Line Subdivision
- Platforms: 1 island platform
- Tracks: 2
- Connections: HealthLine; RTA: 3, 35, 40

Construction
- Structure type: Embankment
- Parking: 91 spaces
- Cycle facilities: Racks
- Accessible: Yes

Other information
- Website: riderta.com/facilities/superior

History
- Opened: June 29, 1930 (Railroad station); March 15, 1955 (Red Line)
- Closed: 1964 (Railroad station)
- Rebuilt: 1996
- Original company: Cleveland Transit System

Services
Preceding station	Rapid Transit	Following station
Little Italy–University Circle toward Airport	Red Line	Windermere Terminus
Former services
Preceding station	New York Central Railroad	Following station
Cleveland toward Chicago	Main Line	Nottingham toward New York
Preceding station	Nickel Plate Road	Following station
Cleveland toward Chicago	Main Line	Euclid toward Buffalo
Preceding station	Rapid Transit	Following station
Euclid–East 120th (Closed 2015) toward Airport	Red Line	Windermere Terminus
Location

Superior station is a station on the RTA Red Line in East Cleveland, Ohio. It is located on Superior Avenue (U.S. Route 6) at the intersection of Emily Street, approximately 1½ blocks west of Euclid Avenue (U.S. Route 20). A small parking lot is located northeast of the station entrance along Emily Street.

== History ==
The station opened along with CTS Rapid Transit on March 15, 1955. It was located across Superior Avenue from the East Cleveland railroad station that served the Nickel Plate and New York Central railroads. The railroad station was constructed in 1929 as part of the Cleveland Union Terminal project, replacing a station located 1 mile (1.6 km) southwest at Euclid and East 120th Street. East Cleveland railroad station was abandoned in the 1960s.

The station was completely rehabilitated as part of an RTA renovation program that began in the late 1990s. The $5 million rehabilitation was completed in September 1996.

== Notable places nearby ==
- Forest Hill Park

== Gallery ==
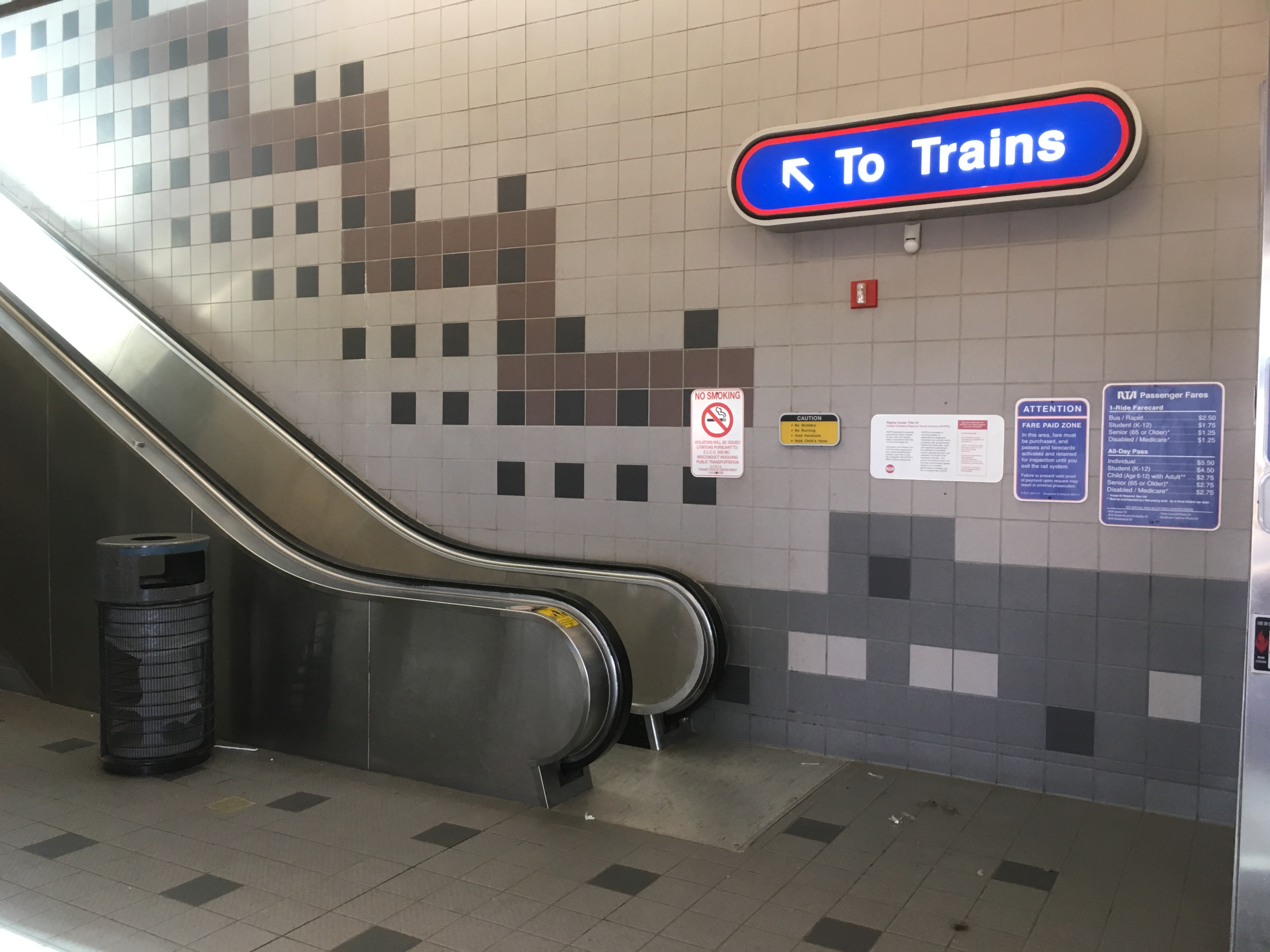

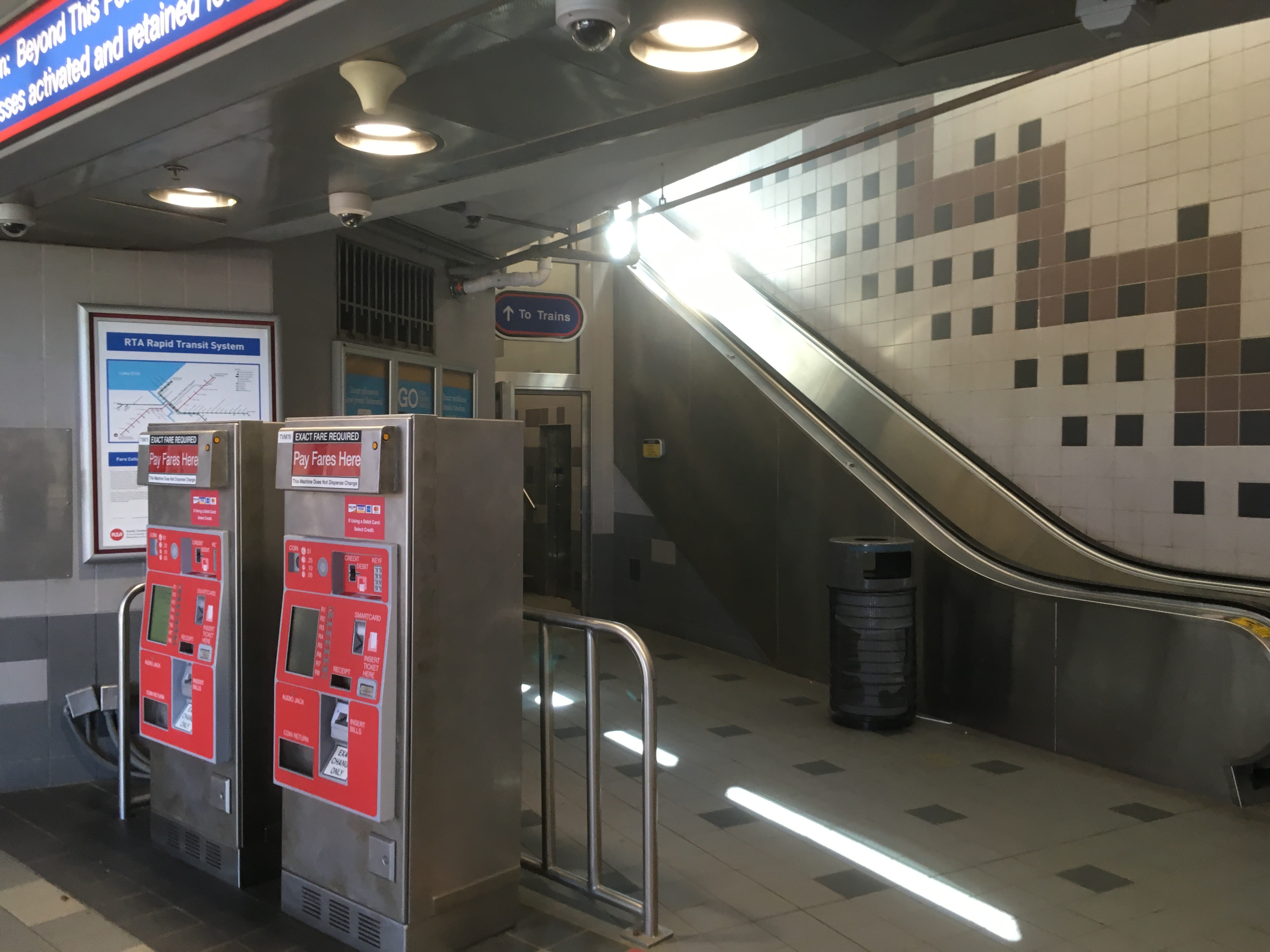

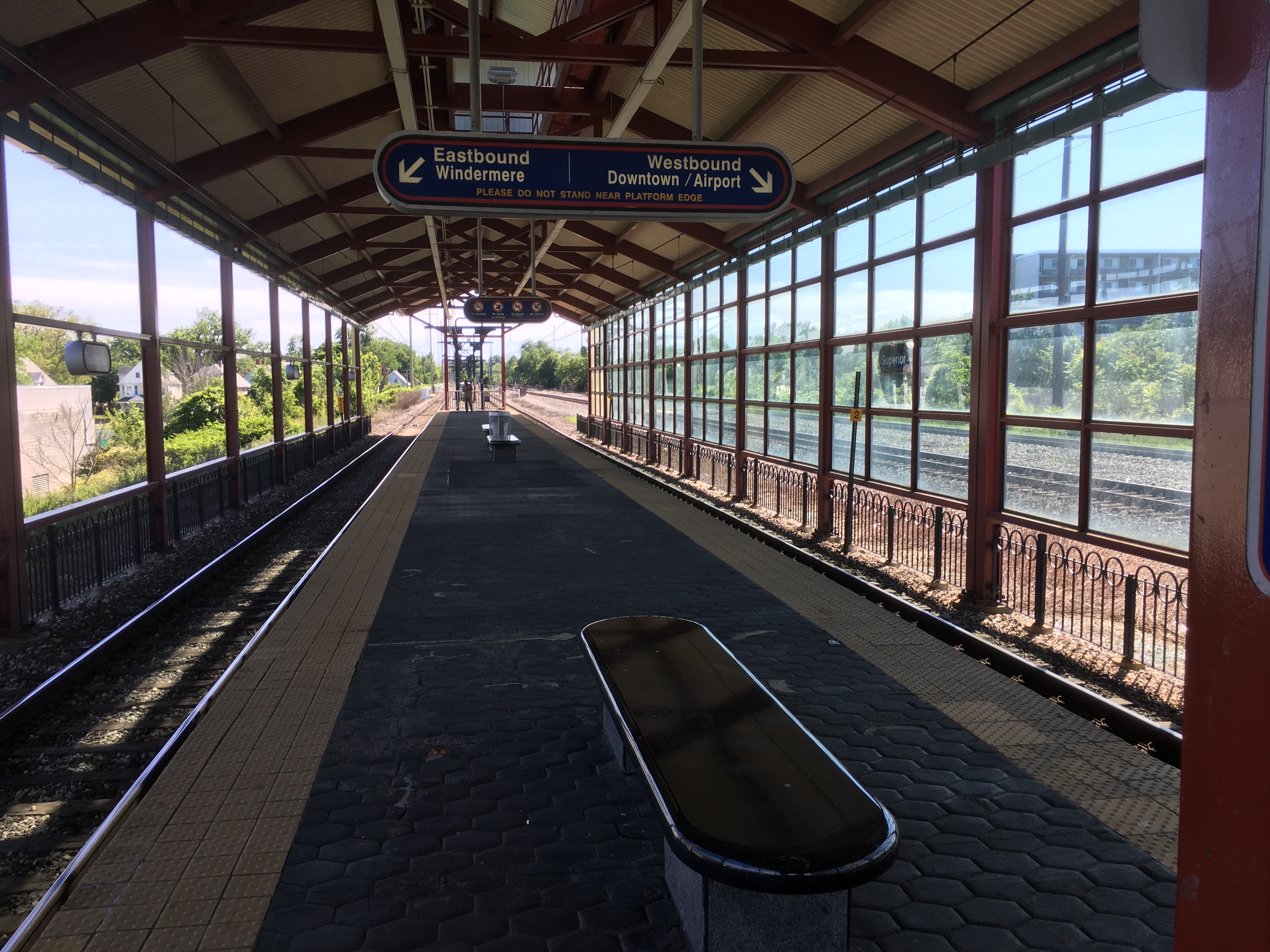
