= Rocky River station =

Railway station in Ohio, United States

Rocky River
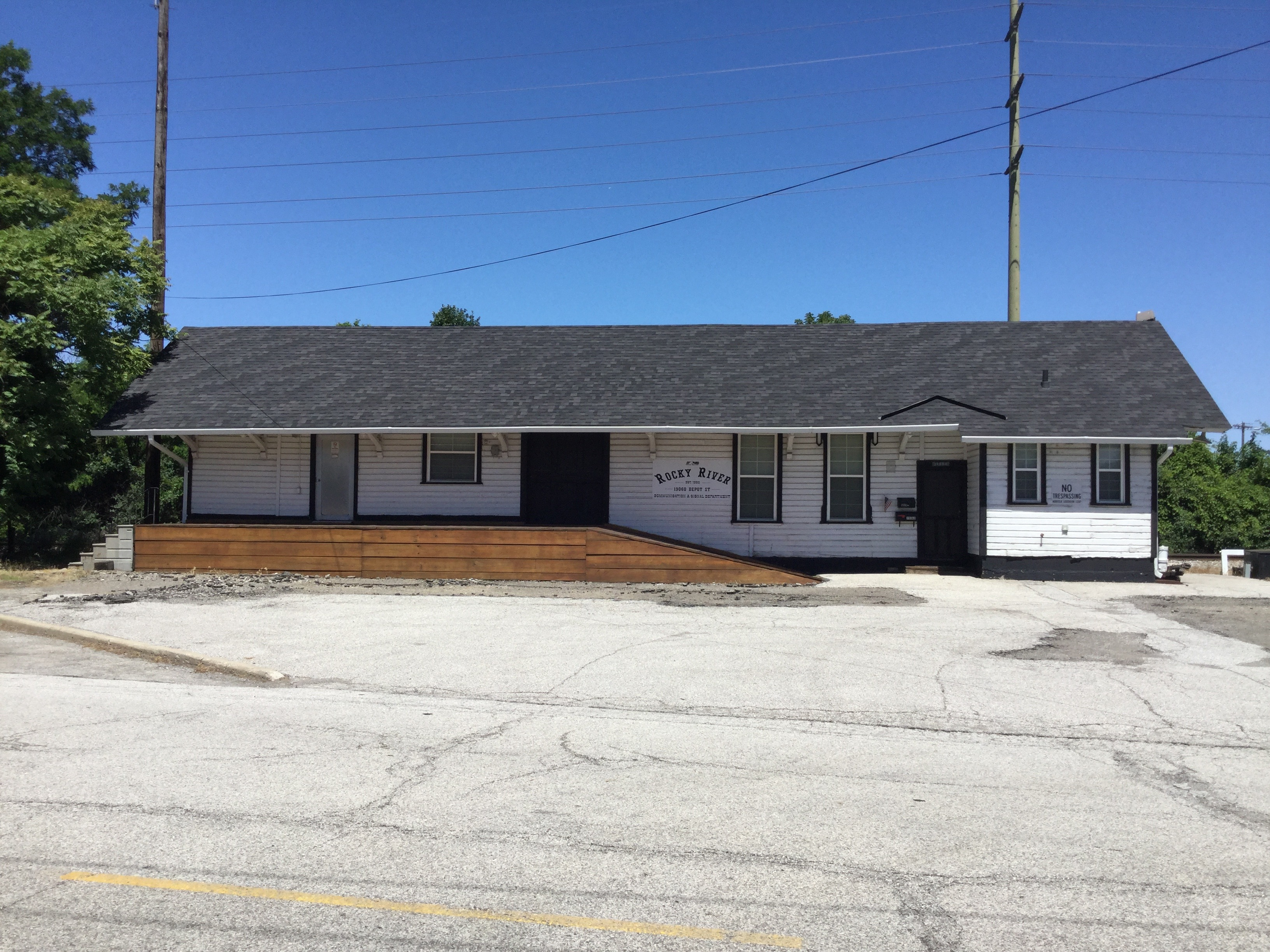
- Station building in Rocky River, 2018

General information
- Location: 19060 Depot Street; Rocky River, Ohio 44116
- Coordinates: 41.4839°N 81.8346°W
- Owner: New York, Chicago and St. Louis Railroad (1930–1964); Norfolk and Western Railway (1964–1997); Norfolk Southern Railway (1997–present)

History
- Opened: 1930
- Closed: 1965

Former services
Preceding station	Nickel Plate Road	Following station
Bay Village toward Chicago	Main Line	Cleveland toward Buffalo
Location

Rocky River station is a former New York, Chicago and St. Louis Railroad station in Rocky River, Ohio.

It is currently used as a communication and signal department for the Norfolk Southern Railway.

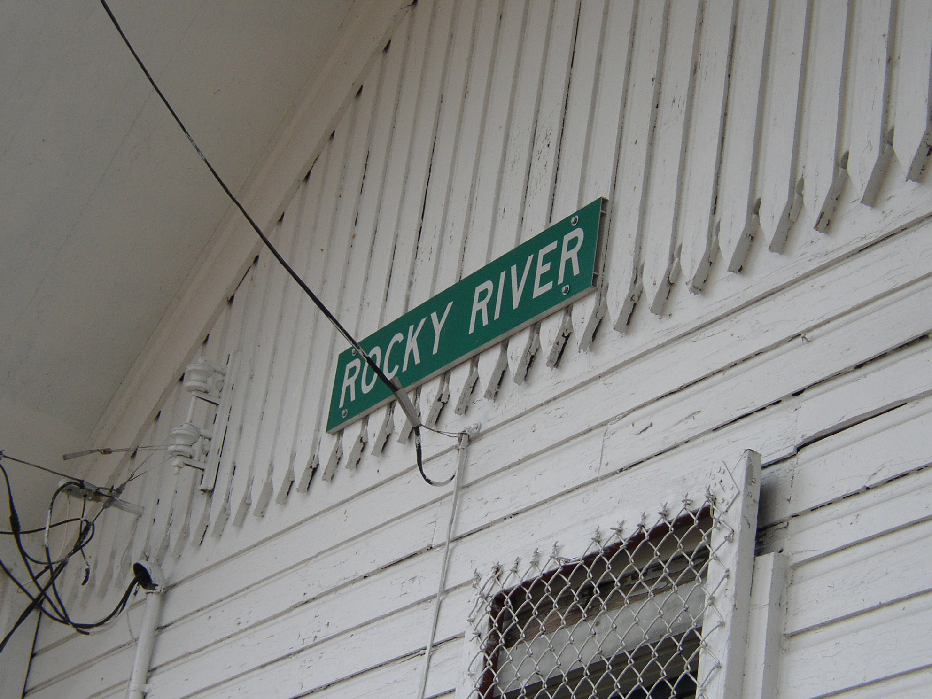
Station sign in 2009
