= Linndale station =

Linndale

General information
- Location: Linndale, Ohio 44135
- Operator: New York Central

History
- Opened: June 29, 1930
- Closed: 1961

Former services
Preceding station	New York Central Railroad	Following station
Berea toward Chicago	Main Line	Cleveland toward New York
Berea toward Cincinnati	Cincinnati – Cleveland	Cleveland Terminus
Berea toward St. Louis	Big Four Route Main Line	Cleveland Terminus

Linndale was a train station in Linndale, Ohio. The station was one of two locations where electric P Motor engines took over operations from steam engines pulling into Cleveland Union Terminal. The switch was necessary due to the city of Cleveland's ban on steam engines near the downtown area. The other station for engine switches was in the Cleveland neighborhood of Collinwood.
