= Chase Financial Plaza =

High rise building in Ohio, United States

Coordinates: 41°29′50″N 81°41′40″W

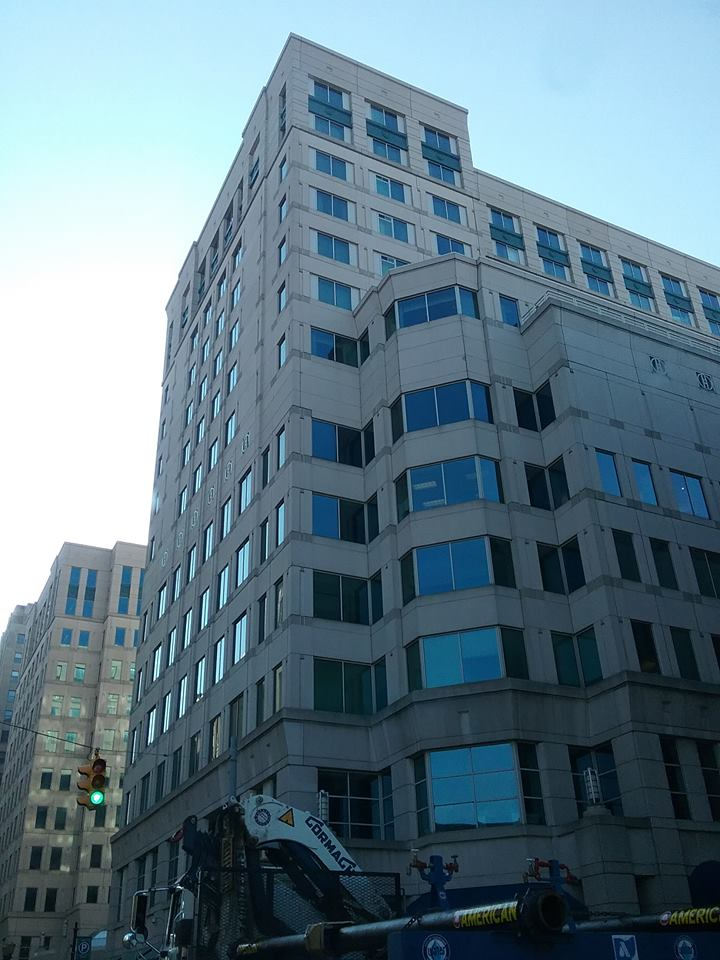
- Interactive map of the Chase Financial Plaza area
- Former names: Chemical Financial Tower, Chase Financial Tower, Ritz-Carlton

General information
- Type: Mixed Use
- Location: 250 West Huron Road; Cleveland, Ohio; United States
- Construction started: 1990
- Completed: 1991

Height
- Roof: 50.42 m (165 ft)

Technical details
- Floor count: 14
- Floor area: 200,000 sq. ft. (office space) 205 rooms (Hotel)

Design and construction
- Architect: RTKL

Other information
- Public transit: Tower City

The Chase Financial Plaza is a 1991-built 14 story 165 foot high rise office building on the Tower City Center property of downtown Cleveland, Ohio. The postmodern building was erected in 1991 when Forest City Enterprises sought to improve the leasing power of the eventual opening of Tower City Center in 1991 which was commenced by Forest City acquiring the iconic Cleveland Union Terminal Group in 1982. The tower's squat appearance is deceiving in the fact that it contains 200,000 square feet of office space. The building closely mirrors its counterpart tower on the other side of the Tower City mall property at West 3rd. Both these structures were built on top of one solid concrete platform that remained from a skyscraper unbuilt in the 1930s It offers views of the Cleveland skyline and the Cuyahoga River. It was one of the first successful mixed-use buildings in the city of Cleveland. This allows it to cater to many different types of tenants.

== Ritz-Carlton Hotel ==
The CFP tower also contains the 205-room Ritz-Carlton Hotel. The addition of the Chase, the Skylight Office Tower and Tower City Center itself revitalized the dead space near the Terminus point. In 2011, the Rock Ventures group, owned and headed by Cleveland Cavaliers owner Dan Gilbert acquired the Ritz-Carlton for a sum close to $27 million from Forest City which has been shedding its Cleveland properties.

== See also ==
- Van Sweringen Brothers
- List of tallest buildings in Cleveland
- Downtown Cleveland
