= Skylight Office Tower =

Coordinates: 41°29′49″N 81°41′37″W

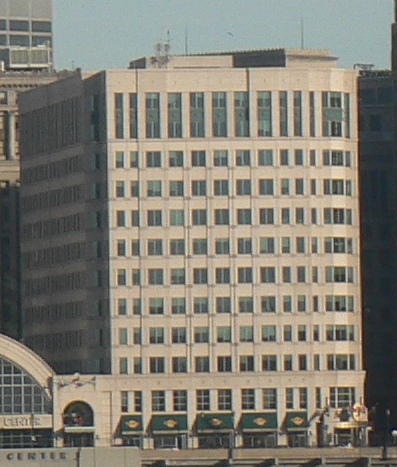
- Skylight Office Tower in Cleveland at Tower City Center
- Interactive map of the Skylight Office Tower area
- Former names: Skylight Office Towers

General information
- Type: Office
- Location: 1660 West 2nd Street Cleveland, Ohio 44113 United States
- Construction started: 1989
- Completed: 1991

Height
- Roof: 50.29 m (165 ft)

Technical details
- Floor count: 12
- Floor area: 321,000 sq. ft.

Design and construction
- Architect: RTKL

The Skylight Office Tower is a 1991-built 12 story 165 foot high-rise office building on the property of Tower City Center in downtown Cleveland, Ohio. Like its closely resembled (though not perfect matching) sister building (Chase Financial Plaza) across the under street level concourse in Tower City's The Avenue, Skylight is postmodern in design and rests on a concrete slab that was left over from an unbuilt office tower in the 1930s that extends underneath the foundations of both the towers. The Skylight contains 321, 0000 square feet of office space and is known for its ornate grand lobby that features imported Italian granite, black marble, and mahogany detailing. The Skylight was constructed by RTKL, just like its sister building and was built at a time when Forest City Enterprises of Cleveland sought to increase the floor space and leasing opportunities for their considerable holdings in downtown.

== The Hard Rock Cafe ==
In 1998, the Hard Rock Cafe Cleveland was opened in the Skylight Office Tower and was one of only two Hard Rock Cafes in Ohio. The Cafe's connection to Tower City Center and the surrounding downtown cityscape made it a magnet for tourists and Clevelanders alike. The Hard Rock, like all Hard Rocks featured Rock & Roll memorabilia and diner style decor. The Hard Rock Cafe at this location closed in July 2016.

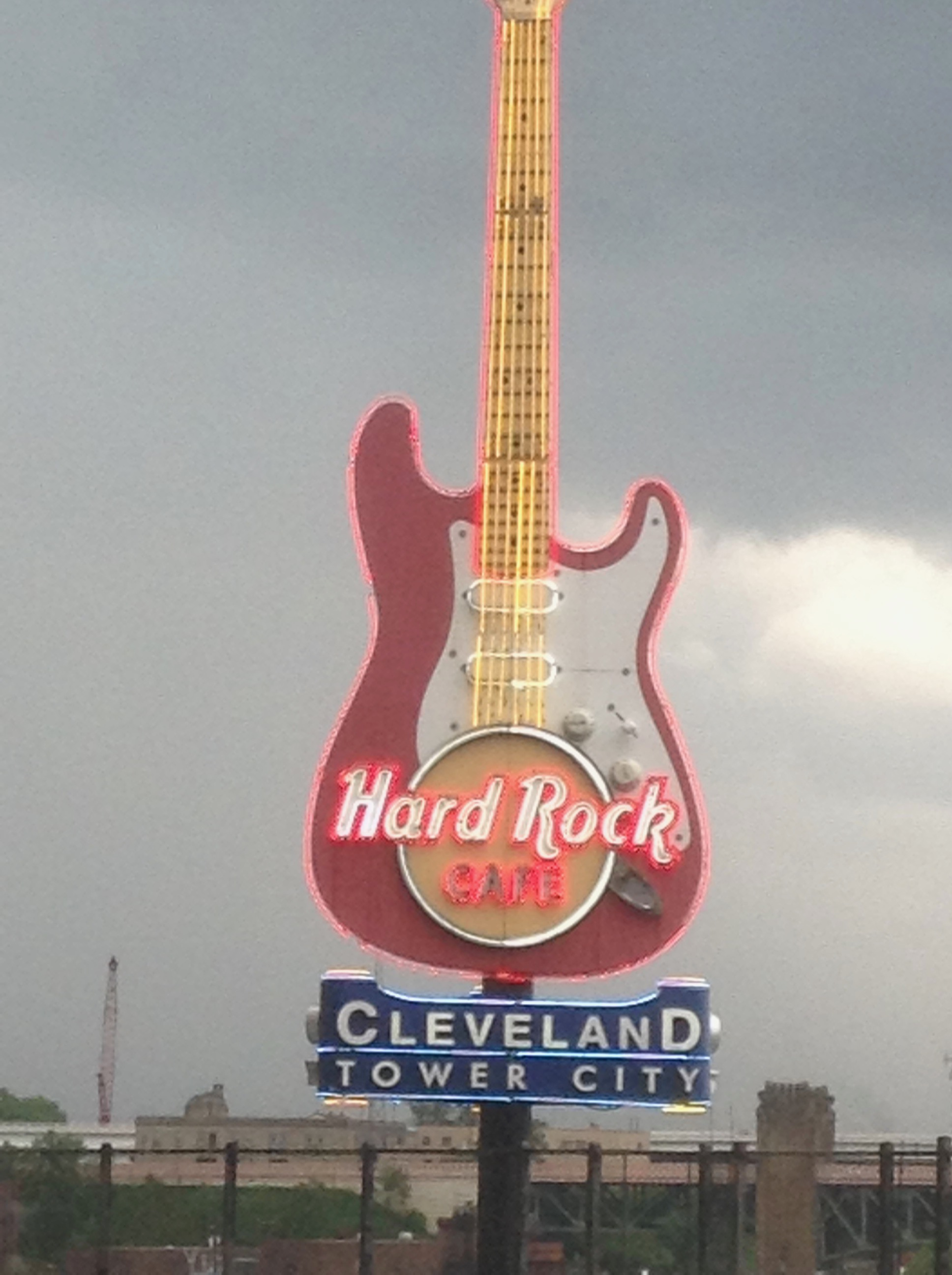
Sign for Tower City before the closing of the Hard Rock Café

== See also ==
- List of tallest buildings in Cleveland
- Hard Rock Cafe
