= Tower City Center =

Mixed-use facility in Cleveland, Ohio

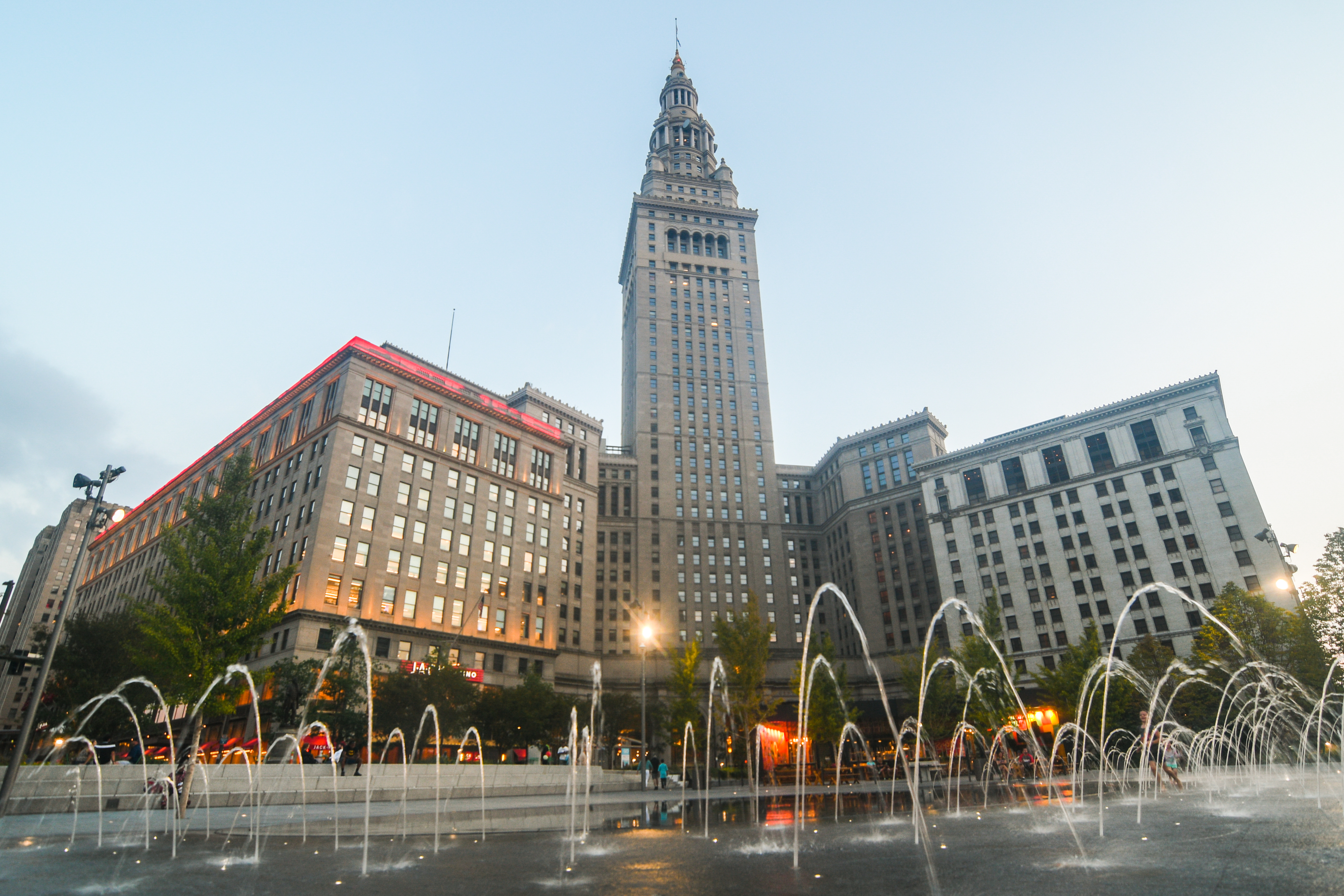
- View from Public Square

General information
- Location: 230 West Huron Road, Cleveland, Ohio
- Coordinates: 41°29′52″N 81°41′39″W

History
- Opened: June 29, 1930 (Terminal)
- Closed: January 14, 1977 (Terminal)
- Former names: Cleveland Union Terminal
Former services
Preceding station	Erie Railroad	Following station
Terminus	Cleveland – Youngstown	East 55th toward Youngstown
Preceding station	Amtrak	Following station
Toledo toward Chicago	Lake Shore	Erie toward New York (Grand Central)
Preceding station	New York Central Railroad	Following station
Linndale toward Chicago	Main Line	East Cleveland toward New York
Linndale toward Cincinnati	Cincinnati – Cleveland	Terminus
Linndale toward St. Louis	Big Four Route Main Line	Terminus
Preceding station	Nickel Plate Road	Following station
Rocky River toward Chicago	Main Line	East Cleveland toward Buffalo
Rocky River toward St. Louis	Cleveland – St. Louis	Terminus
Preceding station	Baltimore and Ohio Railroad	Following station
Terminus	Cleveland – Akron – Wheeling 1940s–1962	Willow toward Wheeling
Terminus	Cleveland – Sterling – Wheeling 1934–1940s	South Brooklyn toward Wheeling
Terminus	Cleveland – Akron – Valley Junction 1934–1940s	Brooklyn toward Valley Junction
- Union Terminal Group
- U.S. National Register of Historic Places
- Architect: Graham, Anderson, Probst & White; Walker & Weeks
- Architectural style: Beaux-Arts, Art Deco
- Website: towercitycenter.com
- NRHP reference No.: 76001405
- Added to NRHP: March 17, 1976
Location

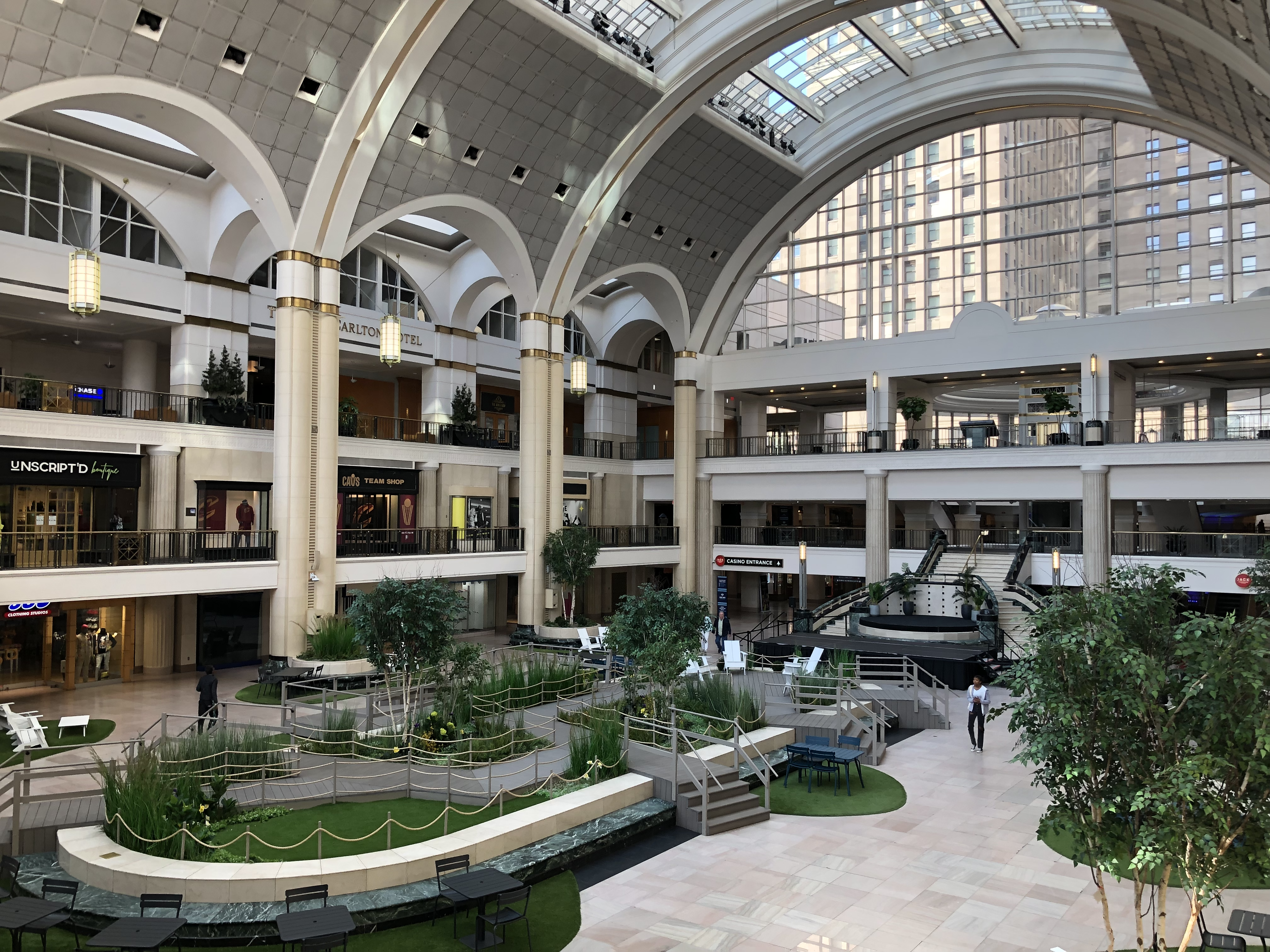
Inside the main shopping concourse in 2023

Tower City Center is a large mixed-use facility in downtown Cleveland, Ohio, in its Public Square. The facility is composed of a number of interconnected office buildings, including Terminal Tower, the Landmark Office Towers, a shopping center, Jack Cleveland Casino, Hotel Cleveland, Chase Financial Plaza, and Tower City station, the main hub of Cleveland's RTA Rapid Transit lines.

The structure was built in 1929 as Cleveland Union Terminal. On March 17, 1976, the complex was added to the National Register of Historic Places.

== History ==
=== Rail terminal ===
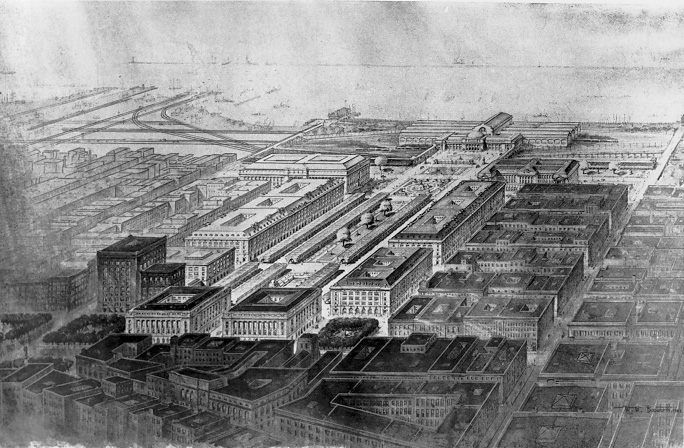
The 1903 Group Plan with a union station on the waterfront

The building complex was originally commissioned by the Van Sweringen brothers, prominent local railroad moguls and real estate developers. The center of the complex was Cleveland Union Terminal (CUT), a terminal for all trains coming into Cleveland via the various railroad lines in a concept similar to Grand Central Terminal in New York City.

When Cleveland Union Terminal was built, the train station allocated the northern set of tracks for interurban or rapid transit service and the southern set of tracks for inter-city rail service. The portion of the station above the interurban tracks was called the Traction Concourse and the portion above the intercity train tracks was called the Steam Concourse. The Van Sweringen brothers envisioned a network of interurban lines extending from the CUT in all directions. They even acquired right-of-way for some of the lines.

The complex was designed by the firm of Graham, Anderson, Probst & White. Site preparation began in 1922, and over 1,000 buildings were demolished. Construction began in 1926, and structural work was completed by 1927. At the time, it was the second-largest excavation project in the world after the Panama Canal. The Terminal Tower opened to its first tenants in 1928. From its completion until 1964, the Terminal Tower was the tallest building in North America outside of New York City. Three other office buildings, the Medical Arts Building, Builders Exchange Building, and Midland Building, were built in addition to the Terminal Tower. The three Art Deco buildings are collectively known as the Landmark Office Towers Complex and were completed in 1929. In addition to the new buildings, the 1918 Hotel Cleveland was connected to the complex. Cleveland Union Terminal was dedicated and officially opened in 1930.

The facility included a number of retail stores and restaurants. Original designs for the complex show that at first the brothers did not plan on building an office tower within the complex. However, they eventually decided to build the 52-story Terminal Tower on the northeast side of the complex facing Public Square.

In 1931, the Higbee Company moved its main store to a new building connected to Cleveland Union Terminal. In 1934, the U.S. Postal Service moved its main Cleveland office to Union Terminal in a new building designed by the firm of Walker and Weeks. It was known as M.K. Ferguson Plaza under the ownership of Forest City Enterprises.

The Union Terminal served most rail lines: the Baltimore and Ohio Railroad, New York Central Railroad and Nickel Plate Road. Exceptions were the Pennsylvania Railroad and initially the Erie Railroad.

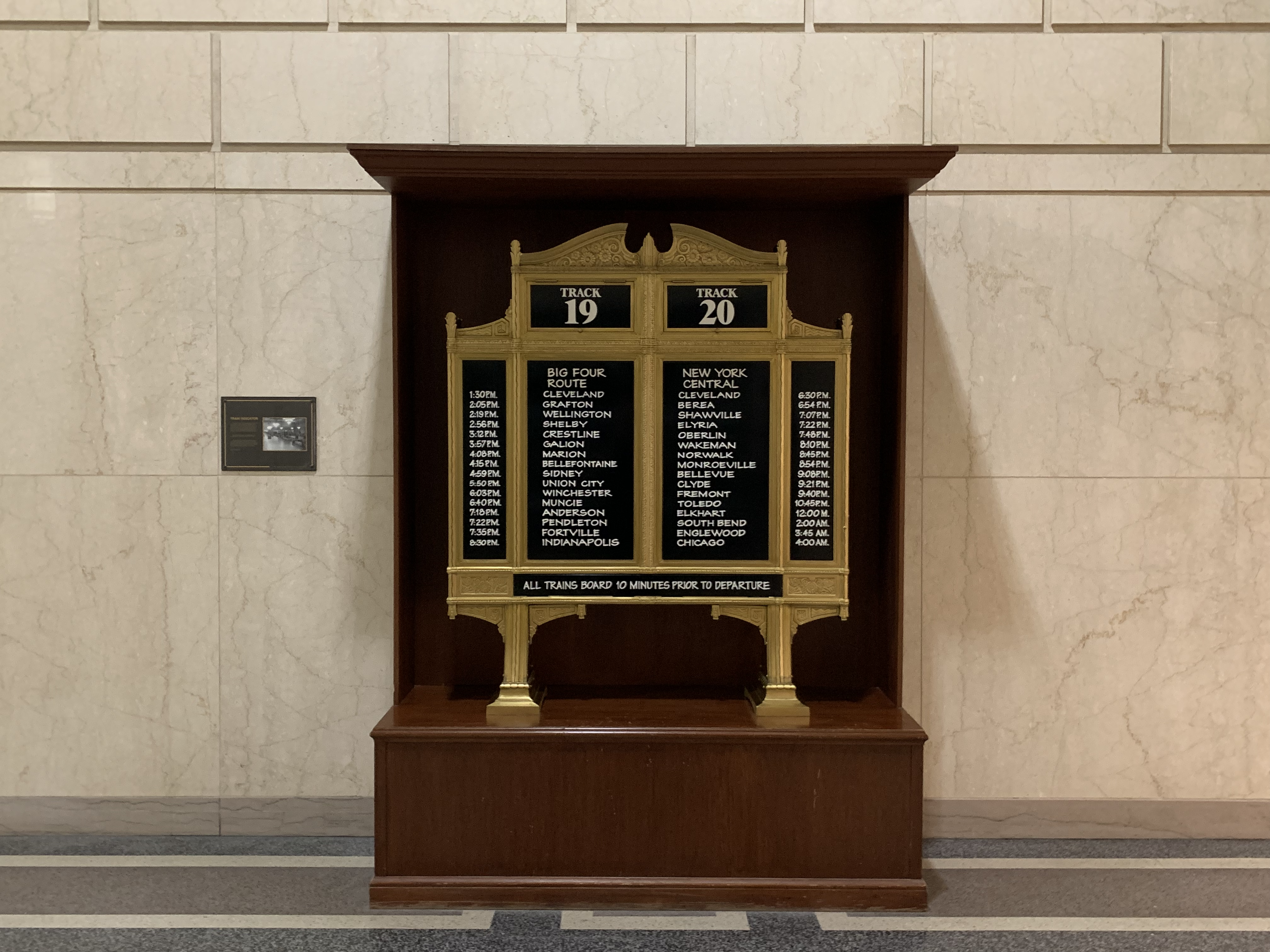
Former departure board

Notable trains, particularly for their destinations included:

- Baltimore and Ohio Railroad:
  - Cleveland Night Express (Cleveland–Pittsburgh–Baltimore)
  - Washingtonian (Cleveland–Pittsburgh–Baltimore)
- Erie Railroad, with the Pittsburgh and Lake Erie Railroad:
  - Steel King (Cleveland–Pittsburgh, with morning and evening variations)
- New York Central Railroad:
  - Chicagoan (Chicago–New York)
  - Cincinnati Mercury (Cincinnati–Cleveland) (beginning in fall, 1951)
  - Cleveland Mercury (Detroit–Cleveland)
  - Empire State Express (Cleveland–New York)
  - Fifth Avenue Special (Chicago–Cleveland-New York)
  - Iroquois (Boston–Chicago; in most years operating westbound only; in some years terminating in Cleveland, in some years having New York as the eastern terminus)
  - North Star (New York–Cleveland; in most years operating westbound only)
  - Ohio State Limited (Cincinnati–Cleveland–New York; in some years stopping for east-bound trips only, in other years running through the city without stopping)
  - Pacemaker (Chicago–Cleveland–New York; in some years stopping for east-bound trips only; in latter years: Cleveland–New York)
  - Southwestern Limited (St. Louis–Indianapolis–Cleveland–New York)
- Nickel Plate Road (Norfolk and Western in final year of service):
  - Nickel Plate Limited (Chicago–Buffalo) [later named City of Chicago westbound/City of Cleveland eastbound]
  - Blue Arrow (Cleveland–St. Louis)/Blue Dart (St. Louis–Cleveland)

However, the station was never particularly popular with the railroads. It required deviating from the quicker route along Lake Erie. As the city would not allow trains to operate under steam power near the downtown area, trains were forced to switch from steam to electric power at a suburban rail yard when heading inbound and then reverse on the way out at another yard. As a result, some lines began to bypass the station entirely, heading along the lake route, and some trains stopped serving the city altogether (examples of the latter case: the New York Central Railroad's Lake Shore Limited and the New England States).

Several east–west routes on the circuit of trains bound east from Chicago through northern Ohio bypassed the city, traveling slightly to the south, passing through Akron and Youngstown, as in the case of B&O and Erie mainlines. In addition, national passenger rail travel had already passed its peak and was starting its gradual decline in favor of the automobile and, later, the airplane. The Erie Railroad, owned by the Van Sweringens, could not afford the electric transfer and continued to use its own nearby station until 1948, when it replaced steam with diesel locomotives and was able to serve the Union Terminal under its own power.

By the end of 1965, the B&O and the Norfolk and Western (the successor to the Nickel Plate) had terminated their last trains that had served Cleveland. By the end of 1967, the New York Central had discontinued all named trains that had run through Cleveland. All that remained as passenger trains were unnamed successors to trains #51 (westbound Empire State Express), #90 (eastbound successor to the Chicagoan), #27/28 (successor to the New England States) and #63/#64 (Chicago–New York) trains.

In the lead-up to the arrival of Amtrak, in 1970 the Erie Lackawanna ran an unnamed train to Youngstown. The Penn Central (successor to the New York Central) Chicago-bound trains stopping at the terminal included an unnamed remnant of the Empire State Express and another unnamed train. East-bound, there was an unnamed successor to the New England States, as well as two other unnamed trains. Southwest-bound there was an Indianapolis-destined remnant of the Southwestern Limited and an Ohio State Limited remnant bound for Columbus.

Amtrak's short-lived Lake Shore served Union Terminal for seven months in 1971. However, Amtrak found the rents prohibitive, and Cleveland's declining rail traffic did not begin to justify such a large facility. When the new Lake Shore Limited began in 1975, Amtrak chose to construct a new station near Lake Erie adjacent to the Cleveland Memorial Shoreway. The new Amtrak station is located near the former Cleveland Union Depot, once served by the Pennsylvania Railroad. The former Erie Railroad commuter service, ultimately inherited by Conrail, was discontinued on January 14, 1977, ending the facility's use as a railroad station.

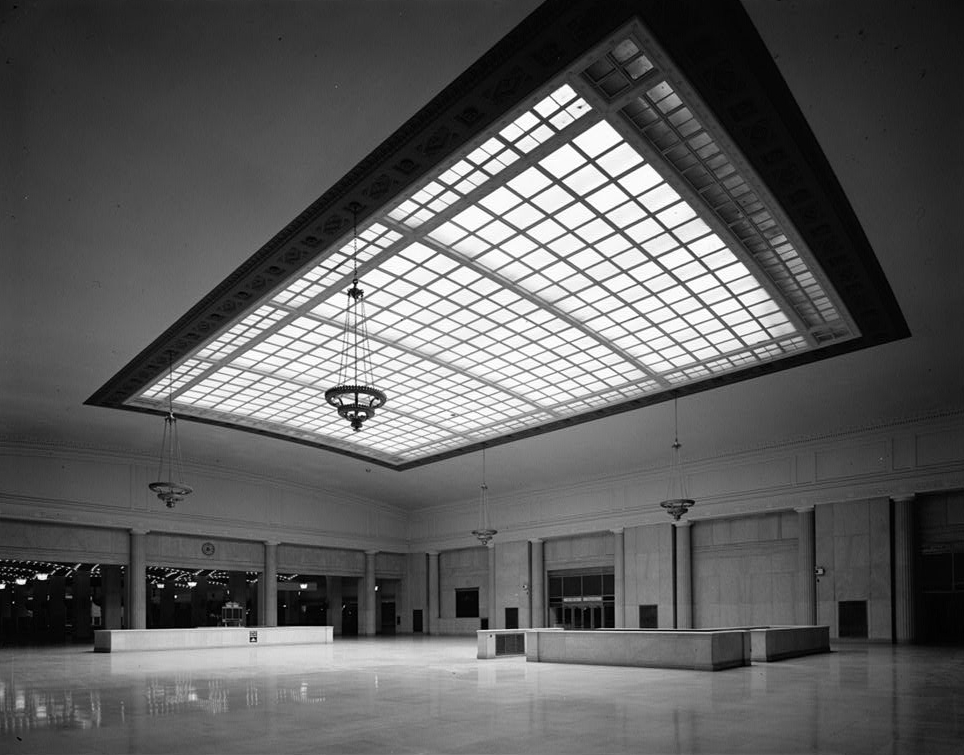
Concourse in 1987

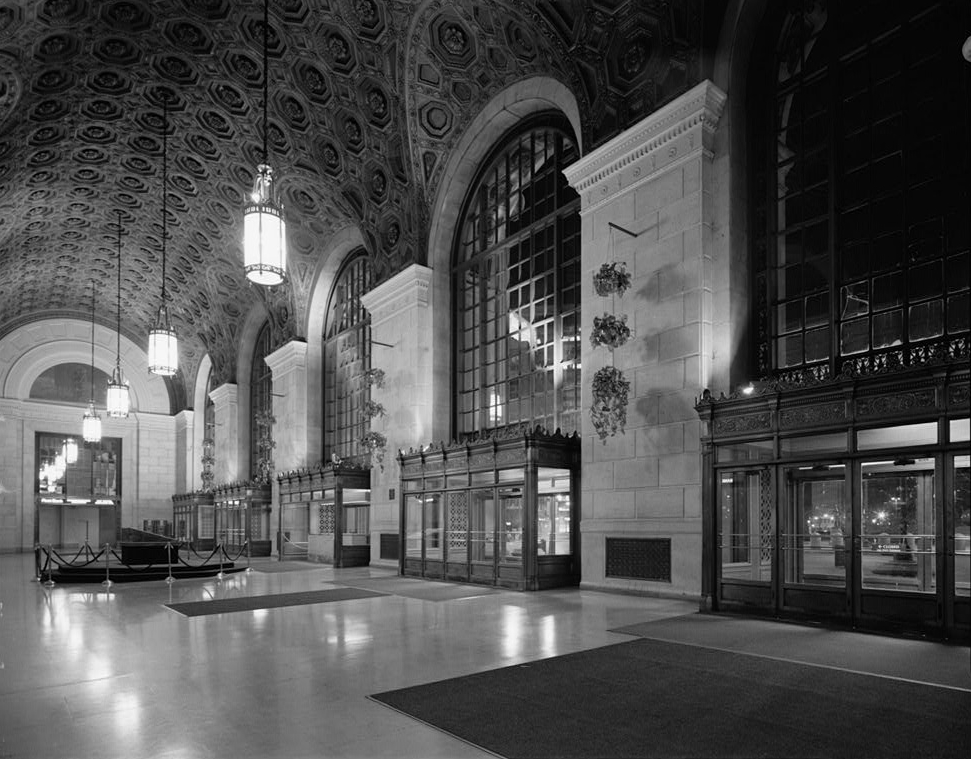

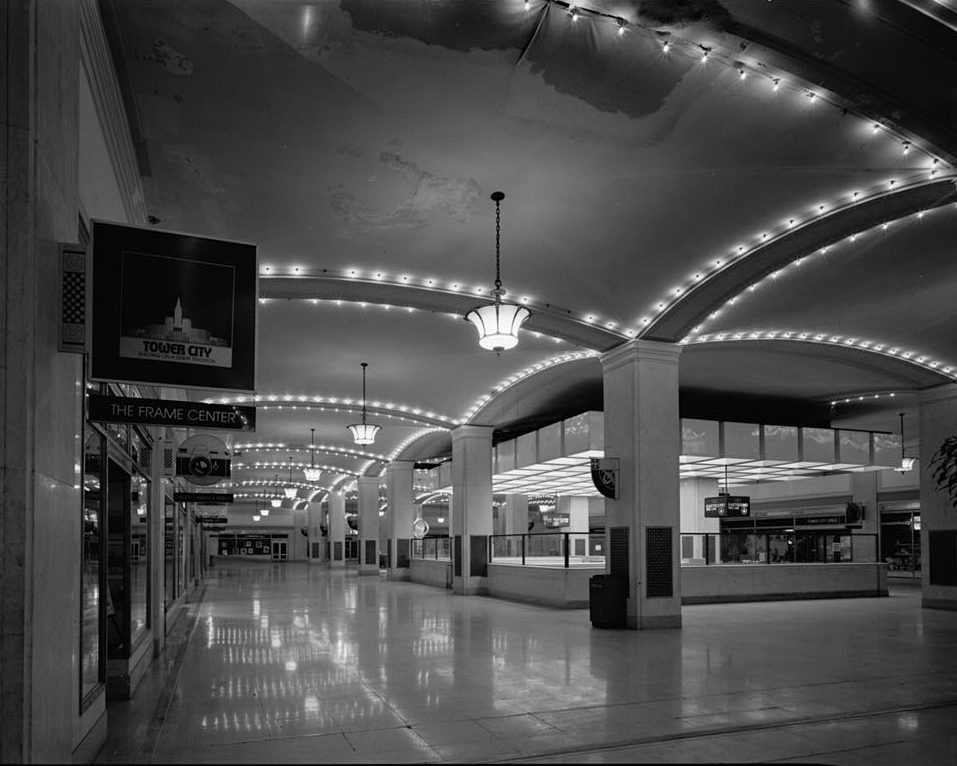

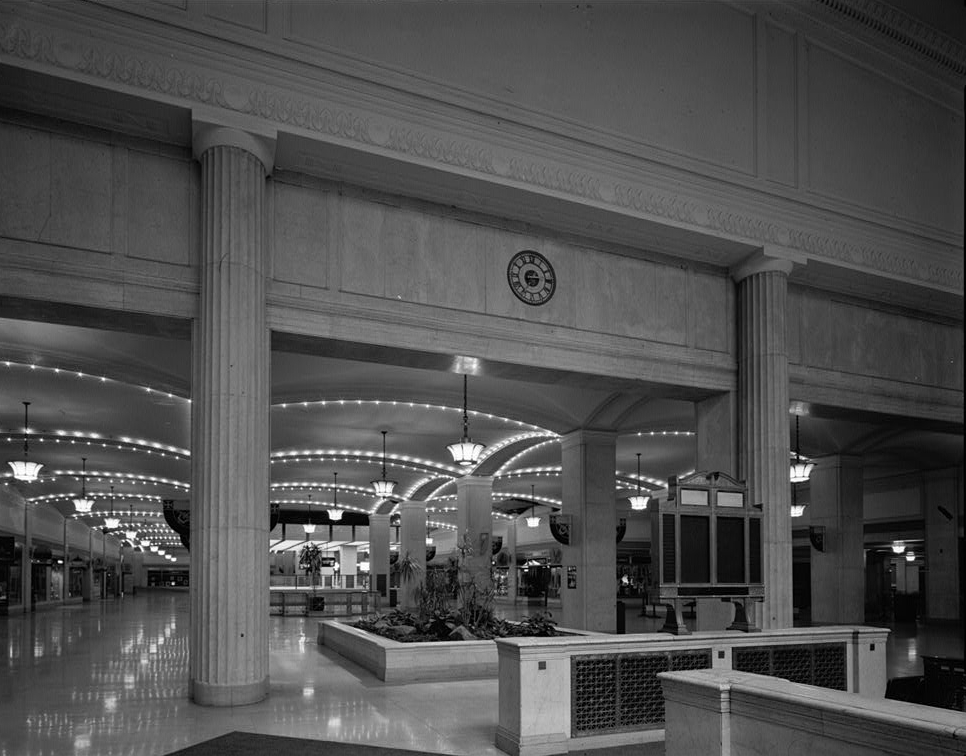

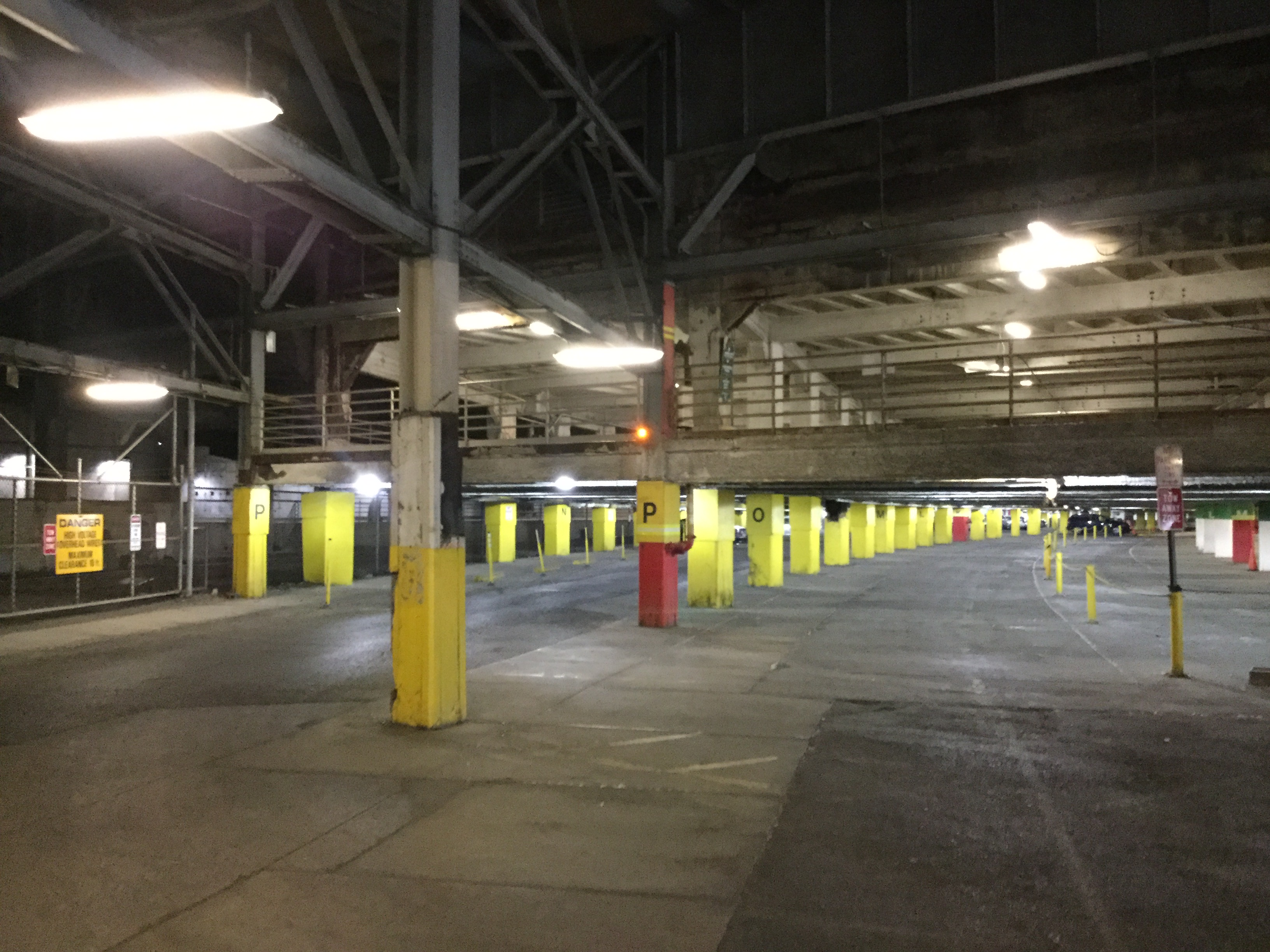
Platforms converted into parking decks

Diagrams of former Cleveland area railroad stations

New York, Chicago and St. Louis

LS&MS (New York Central) - AMTK

ERIE (Erie Lackawanna Railway) - CR

CT&V (Baltimore and Ohio) - CVSR

=== Shopping mall ===
Most of the platform area was demolished in the late 1980s renovation of the building. The station area itself was converted by Forest City Enterprises into a three-story, 367,000 square foot shopping mall and food court known as The Avenue, which opened on March 26, 1990. As part of the renovation, RTA rebuilt its rapid transit station beneath the center. The rest of the platform area was turned into a parking garage for the new complex. When the already renamed Tower City Center reopened, the mall housed many high-end retailers, including Bally of Switzerland, Barneys New York, Fendi, Gucci, Versace, and even had a letter of intent from Neiman Marcus to build a 120,000-square foot anchor store in 1992. Over the following 25 years, many of those shops were replaced by more-modest stores, some of them local retailers.

In 1991, two new 11-story office towers, the Skylight Office Tower and the Chase Financial Plaza, were added. The Chase Building houses Cleveland's Ritz-Carlton Hotel and The Skylight Office Tower once housed the Hard Rock Cafe. After the completion of the nearby Gateway project in 1994, RTA built an indoor walkway connecting Tower City to the complex. A second walkway was built in 2002 to connect Tower City with the Carl B. Stokes U.S. Courthouse.

Higbee's (by then bought by Dillard's) closed its department store in the complex in January 2002. Positively Cleveland (formerly the Convention and Visitors Bureau of Greater Cleveland) and the Greater Cleveland Partnership (the local chamber of commerce) opened offices in the Higbee Building in 2007. Until late 2010, the Cleveland Plus Visitors Center occupied the first floor. The building was opened on May 14, 2012, as the Horseshoe Casino Cleveland. After Rock Gaming LLC assumed management of the Horseshoe, the casino was transformed into Jack Cleveland Casino and reopened on May 11, 2016.

In 2001, Time Warner Cable Amphitheater opened as an outdoor stage along the Cuyahoga River near the Tower City Complex. A site on the Cuyahoga River side of the complex was proposed as a location for a new Cleveland convention center, but in January, 2009 the Cuyahoga County Commissioners decided to redevelop the existing facility.

In July 2021 businessman Dan Gilbert's company Bedrock announced plans to convert the mall into a "retail marketplace" with a blend of retail and entertainment. In 2022, the mall's signature dancing fountain was shut down and capped with Skylight Park, a greenery and boardwalk installation. The fountain was removed in early 2026 to create more event space in the mall.

== Former rapid transit stations ==
=== Former Cleveland Transit System station ===
The Red Line took the place of a never-completed interurban line. An additional vault for that line was located at Mayfield Road, now the Little Italy–University Circle station.

==== History ====
The Shaker rapid transit remained the only service using the interurban portion of the CUT for 25 years. When the Cleveland Transit System built its rapid transit (later designated the Red Line) in 1955 (using much of the right-of-way previously developed by the Van Sweringens), another rapid transit station was built in the former interurban area of the CUT to serve it. Since the CTS Rapid Transit (Red Line) and the Shaker rapid transit (Green and Blue Lines) were owned by different entities at the time, there was no fare transfer between the trains, and the stations were entirely separate.

In 1968, the Cleveland Transit System line finished its extension through Cleveland's west side to Cleveland Hopkins International Airport and Cleveland became the first North American city with direct rapid transit access from downtown to an airport.

Both lines became part of the Greater Cleveland Regional Transit Authority when it assumed control on September 5, 1975. The two stations remained separate until December 17, 1990, when an entirely new station was completed with the development of Tower City Center.

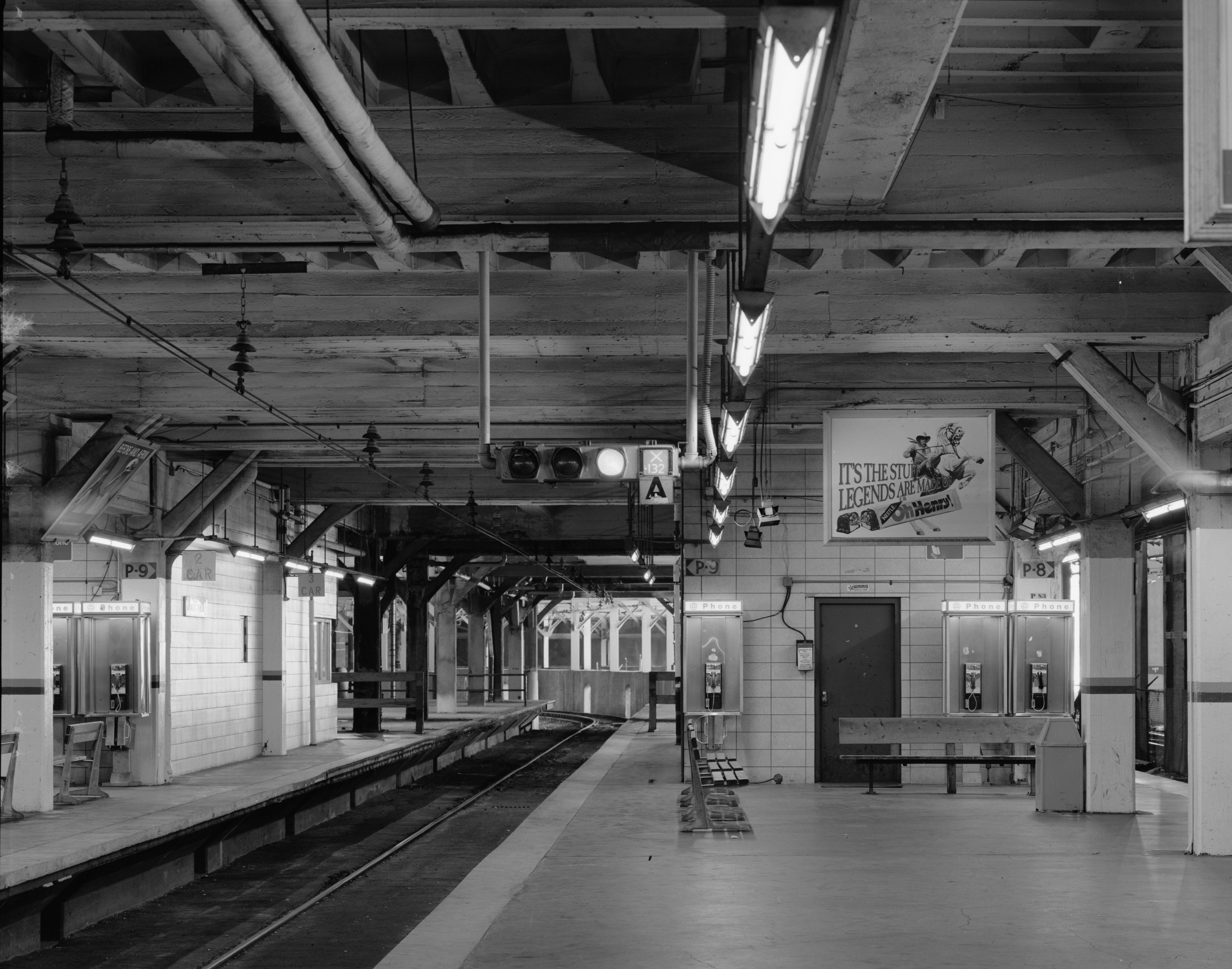
Platform looking west

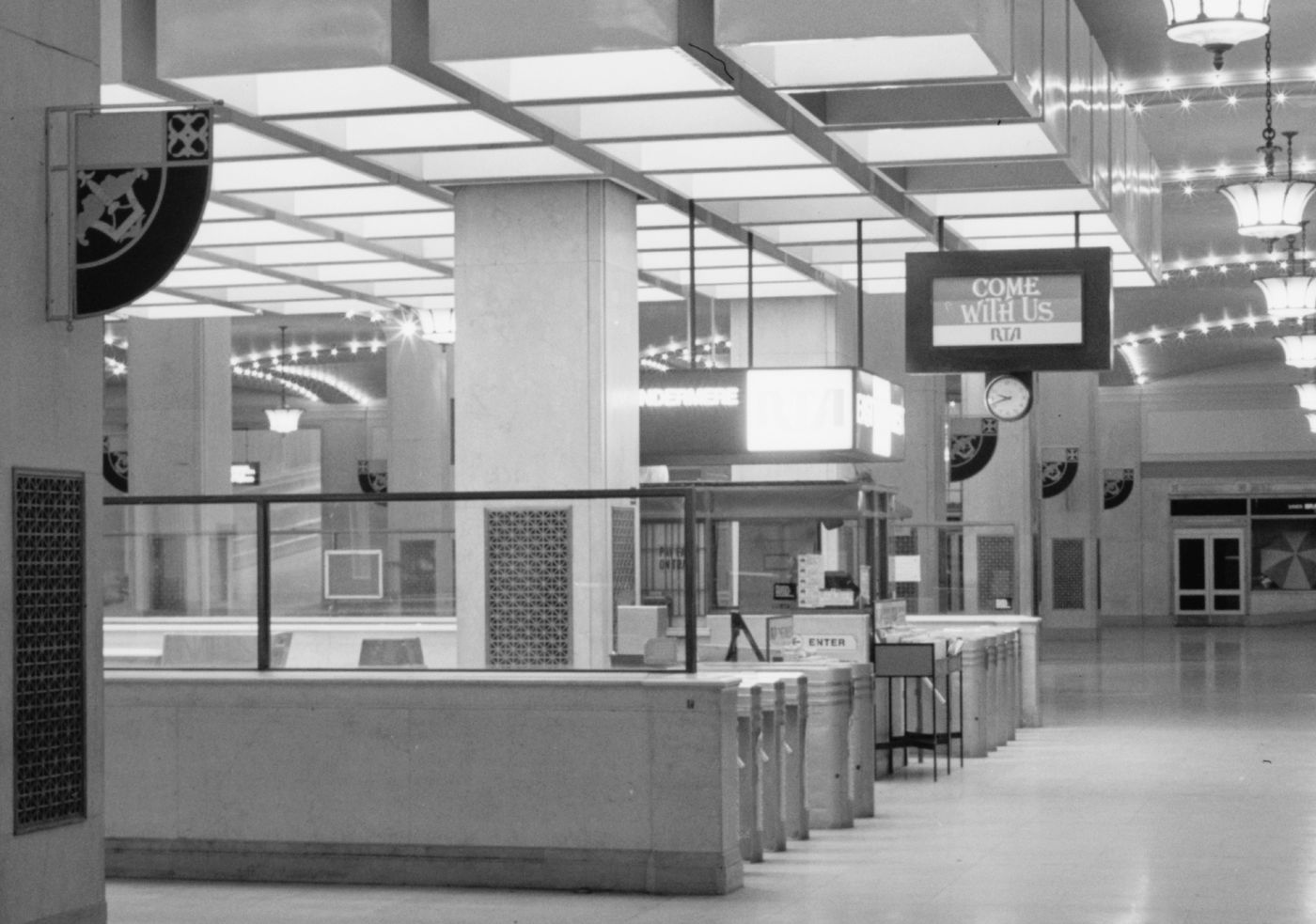
Main Red Line entrance in 1980s

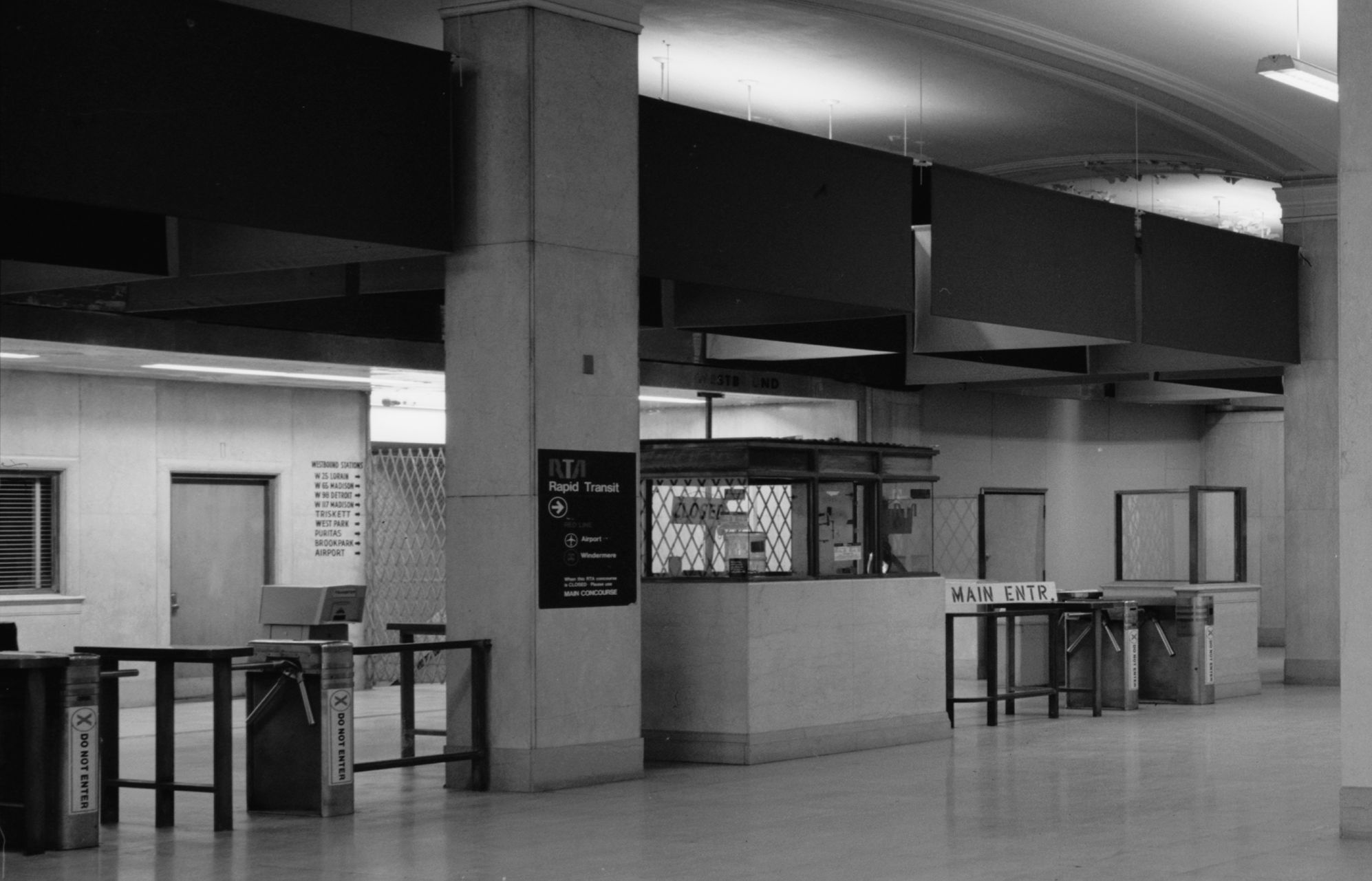
Secondary Red Line entrance in 1980s

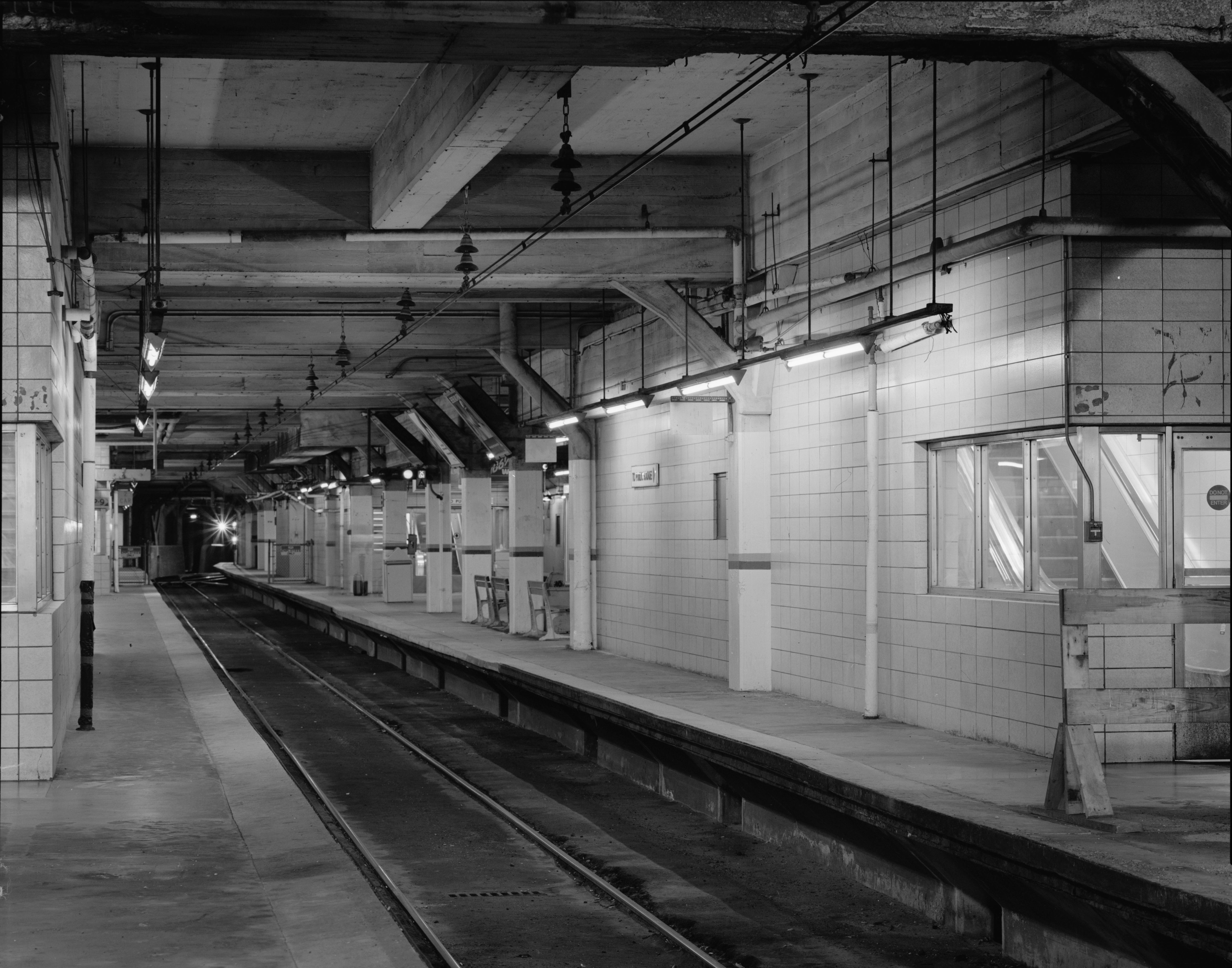
Red Line platform in 1980s looking east

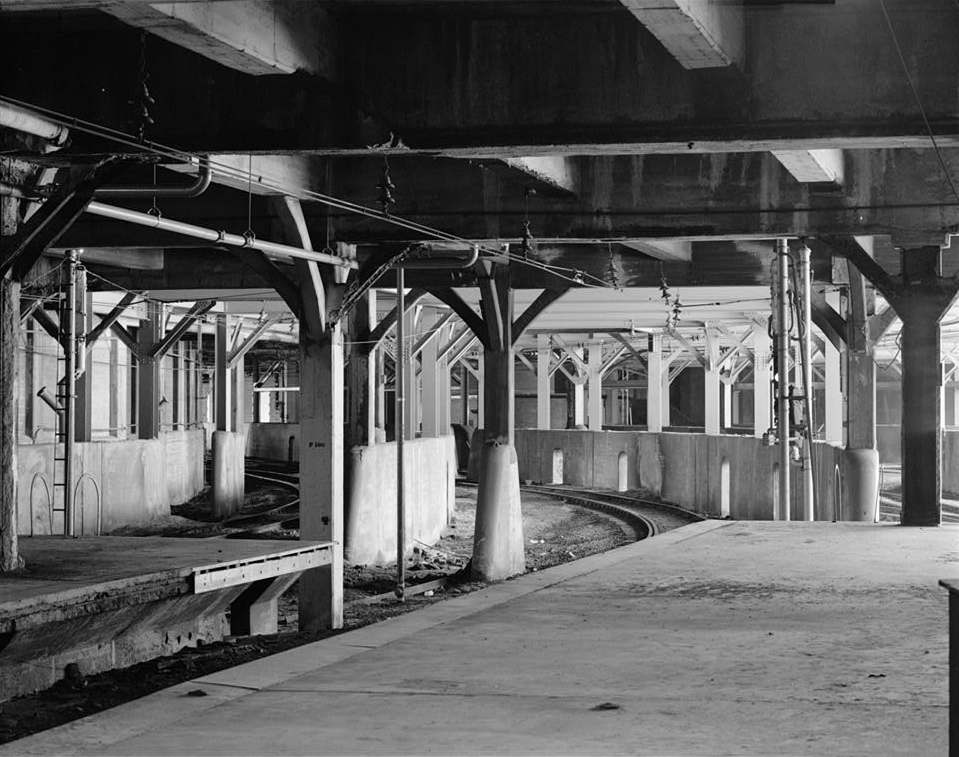
End of platform

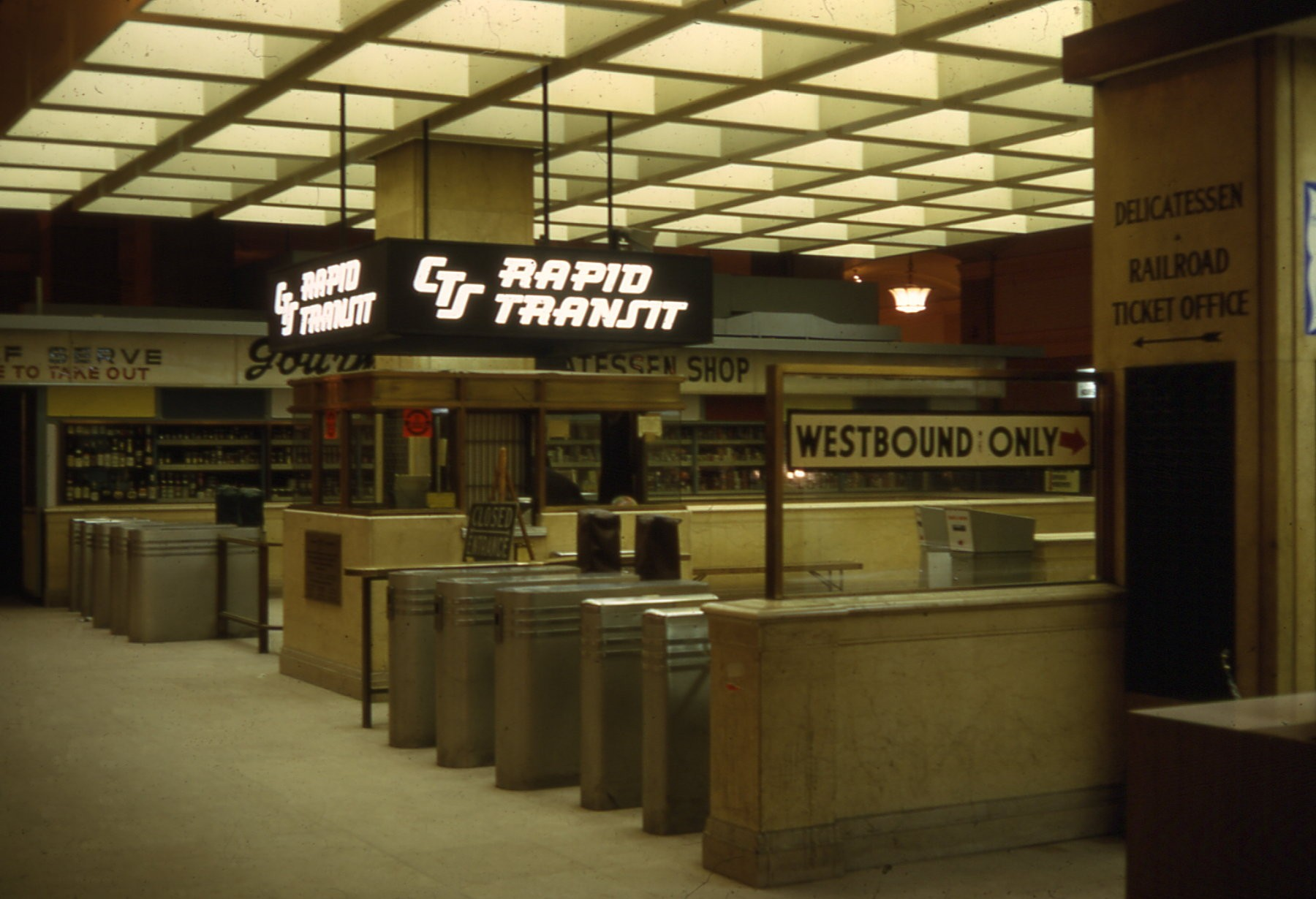
The entrance to the CTS station in 1968

=== Former Shaker Rapid station ===
Tower City
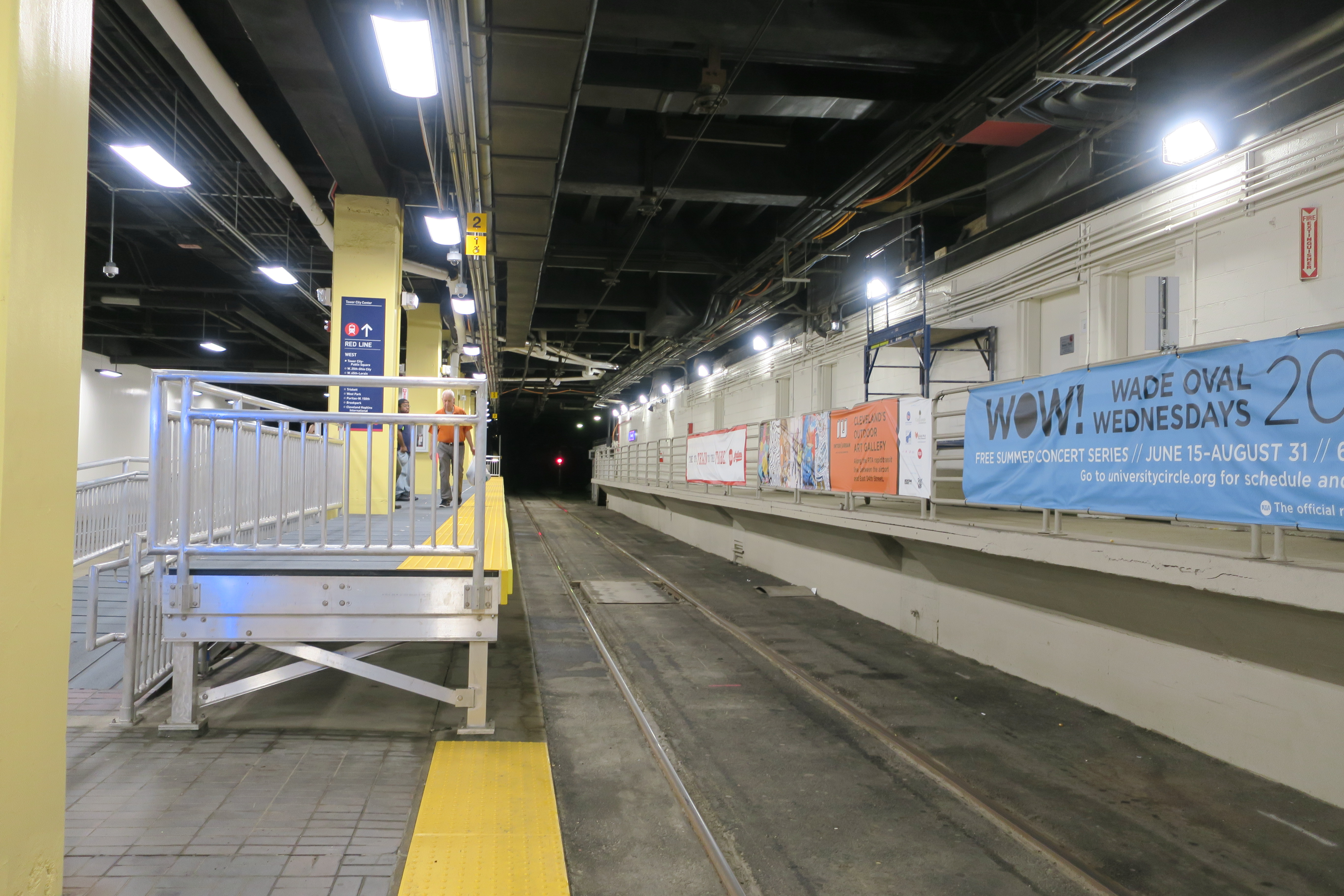
- Temporary platforms in August 2016

General information
- Owner: Greater Cleveland Regional Transit Authority

Construction
- Structure type: Underground

History
- Opened: July 20, 1930; July 31, 2016; March 20, 2017; December 28, 2020; March 5, 2024; February 17, 2025
- Closed: December 9, 1990; November 26, 2016; April 2, 2017; 2021; May 16, 2024
- Former names: Public Square, Downtown Terminal, Cleveland Terminal
- Original company: Cleveland Interurban Railroad
Former services
Preceding station	Rapid Transit	Following station
2016, 2017, 2020, 2024, 2025
West 25th–Ohio City toward Airport	Red Line	Tri-C–Campus District One-way operation
through to Waterfront Line	Blue Line	Tri-C–Campus District One-way operation
through to Waterfront Line	Green Line	Tri-C–Campus District One-way operation
Settlers Landing toward South Harbor	Waterfront Line	through to Blue and Green Lines
Until 1980s
Terminus	Blue Line	East 34th–Campus toward Warrensville–Van Aken
Terminus	Green Line	East 34th–Campus toward Green Road
Location

These platforms opened with the extension of the Cleveland Interurban Railroad from just east of the ramp at East 34th Street and Broadway in 1930.

==== History ====
Since the Van Sweringens-owned Cleveland Interurban Railroad which served the suburb of Shaker Heights, the interurban portion of the CUT was immediately occupied by the Shaker trains upon completion on July 20, 1930. (Previously, the Shaker trains had used streetcar tracks to reach downtown from East 34th Street, which caused significantly slower service.) The Shaker rapid transit station was located along the northernmost tracks of the complex, and it included a small yard for the storage of a few trains and a loop to allow trains to reverse direction. Development of the other interurban services, however, was stalled by the Great Depression, which hit the Van Sweringens particularly hard. By 1944, ownership of the Shaker rapid transit passed to the city of Shaker Heights.

The Shaker and Van Aken lines became part of the Greater Cleveland Regional Transit Authority when it assumed control on September 5, 1975. The two stations remained separate until December 17, 1990, when a completely new station was completed with the development of Tower City Center.

The platform was temporarily re-opened for westbound passengers in 2016, 2017, 2020, 2024, and 2025.

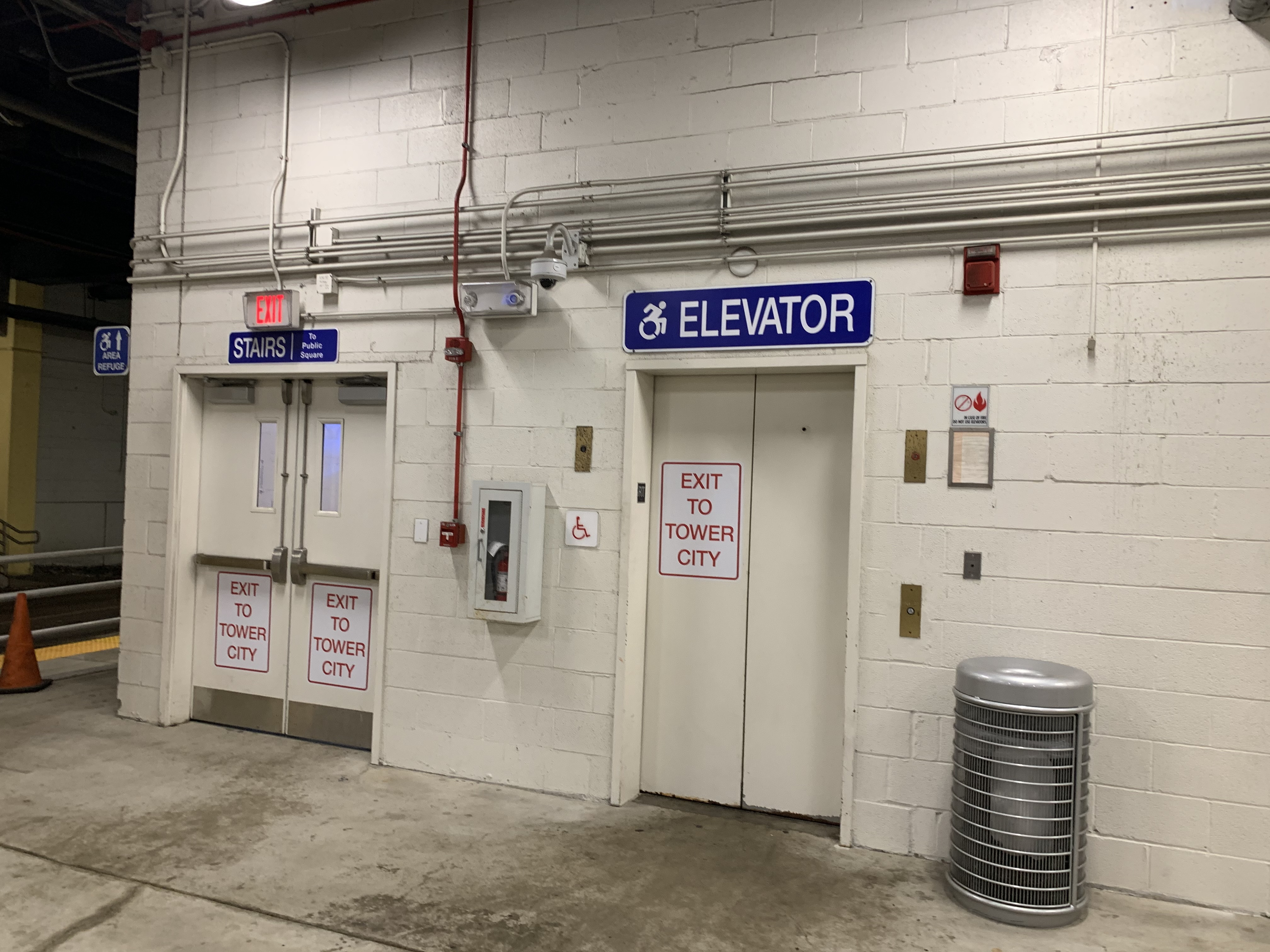
Stair and Elevator Access

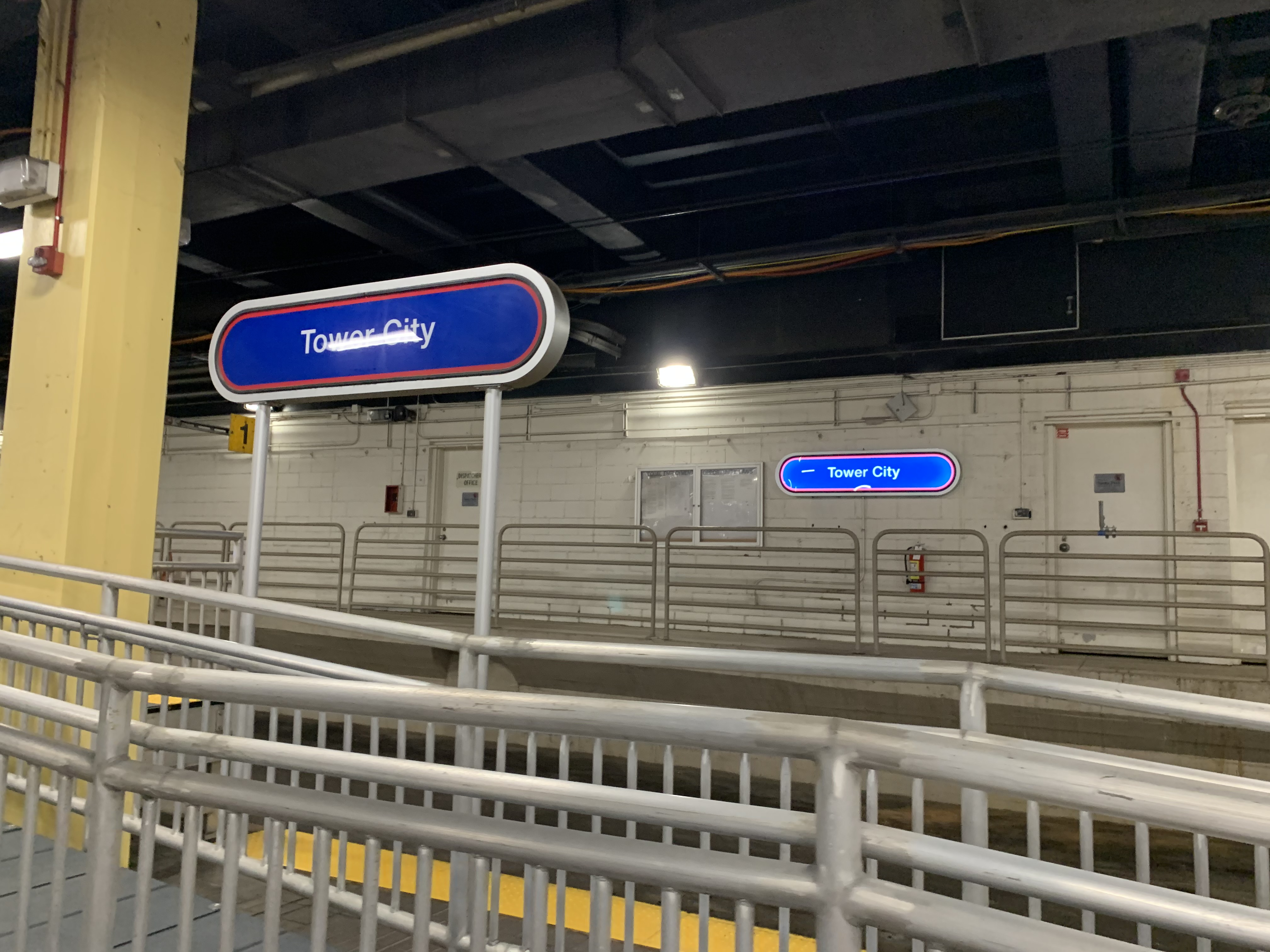
Platform signage

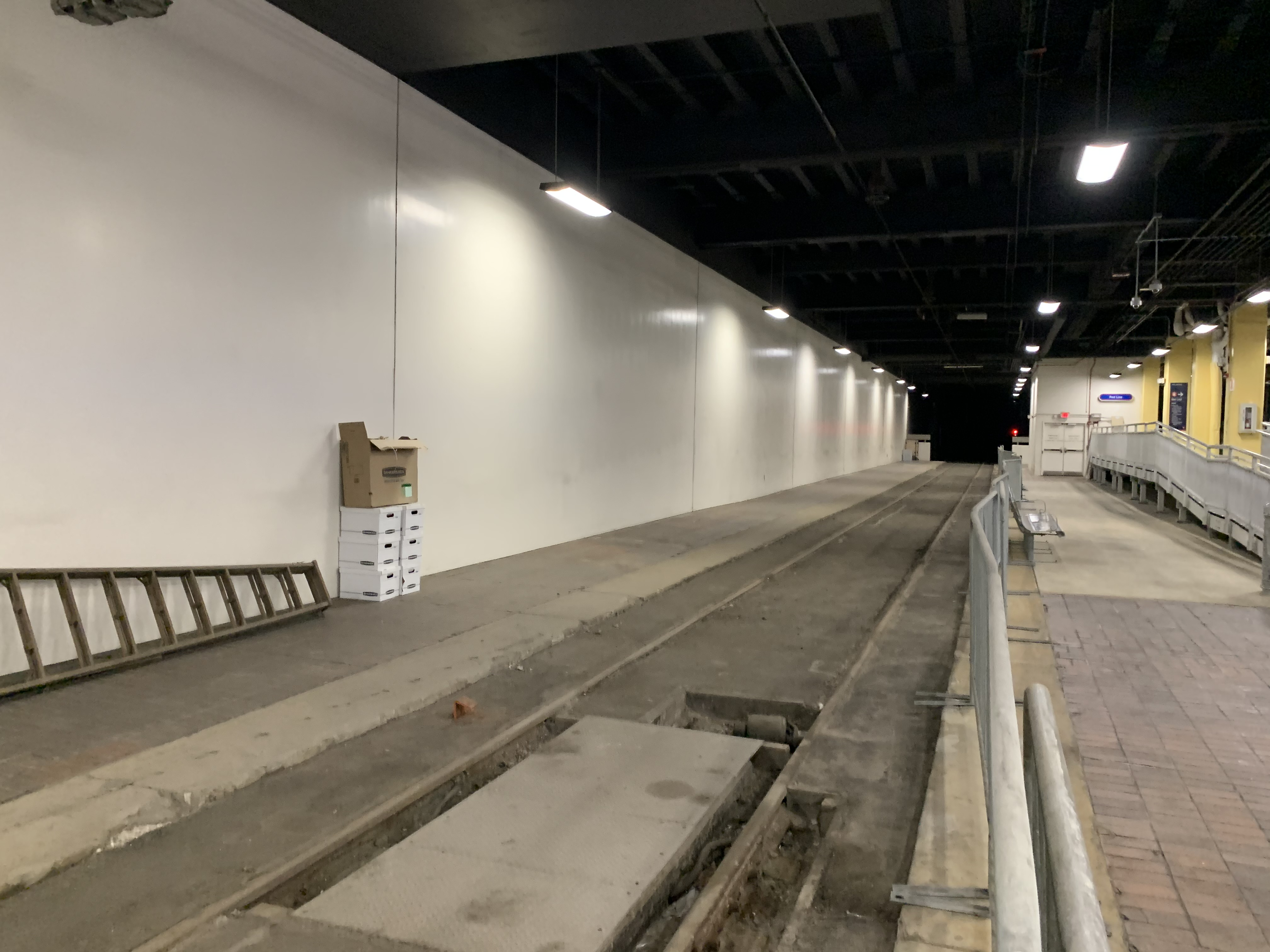
Former Shaker platforms

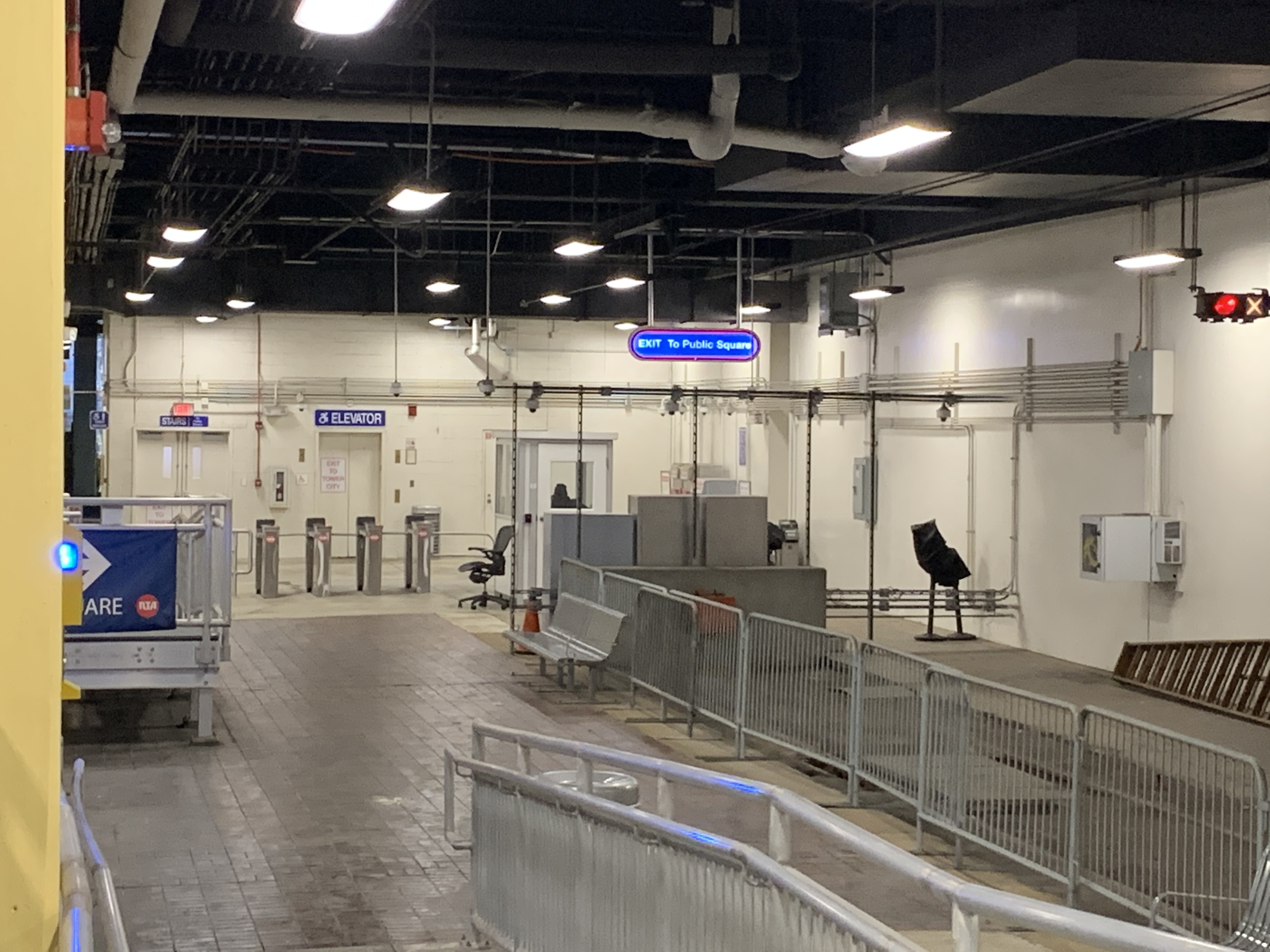
Platform view of turnstiles

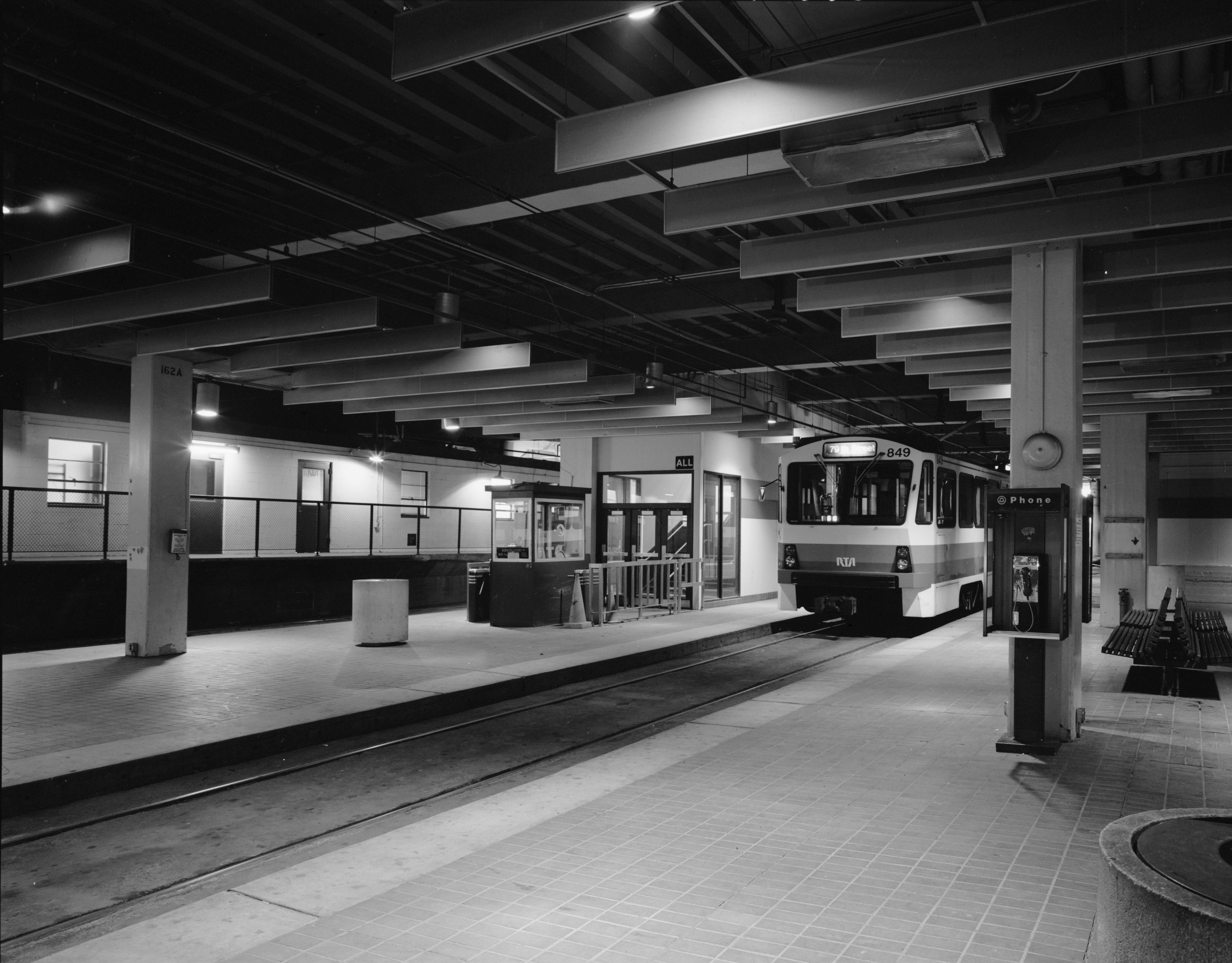
Platforms in the 1980s

== See also ==
- Public Square
- List of Registered Historic Places in Cleveland, Ohio
- List of historical passenger rail services in Cleveland

=== Connected components of Tower City Center ===
- Tower City station
- Chase Financial Plaza
- Jack Cleveland Casino
- Hotel Cleveland
- Skylight Office Tower
- Terminal Tower
