= Puritas–West 150th station =

Rapid transit station in Cleveland

Puritas
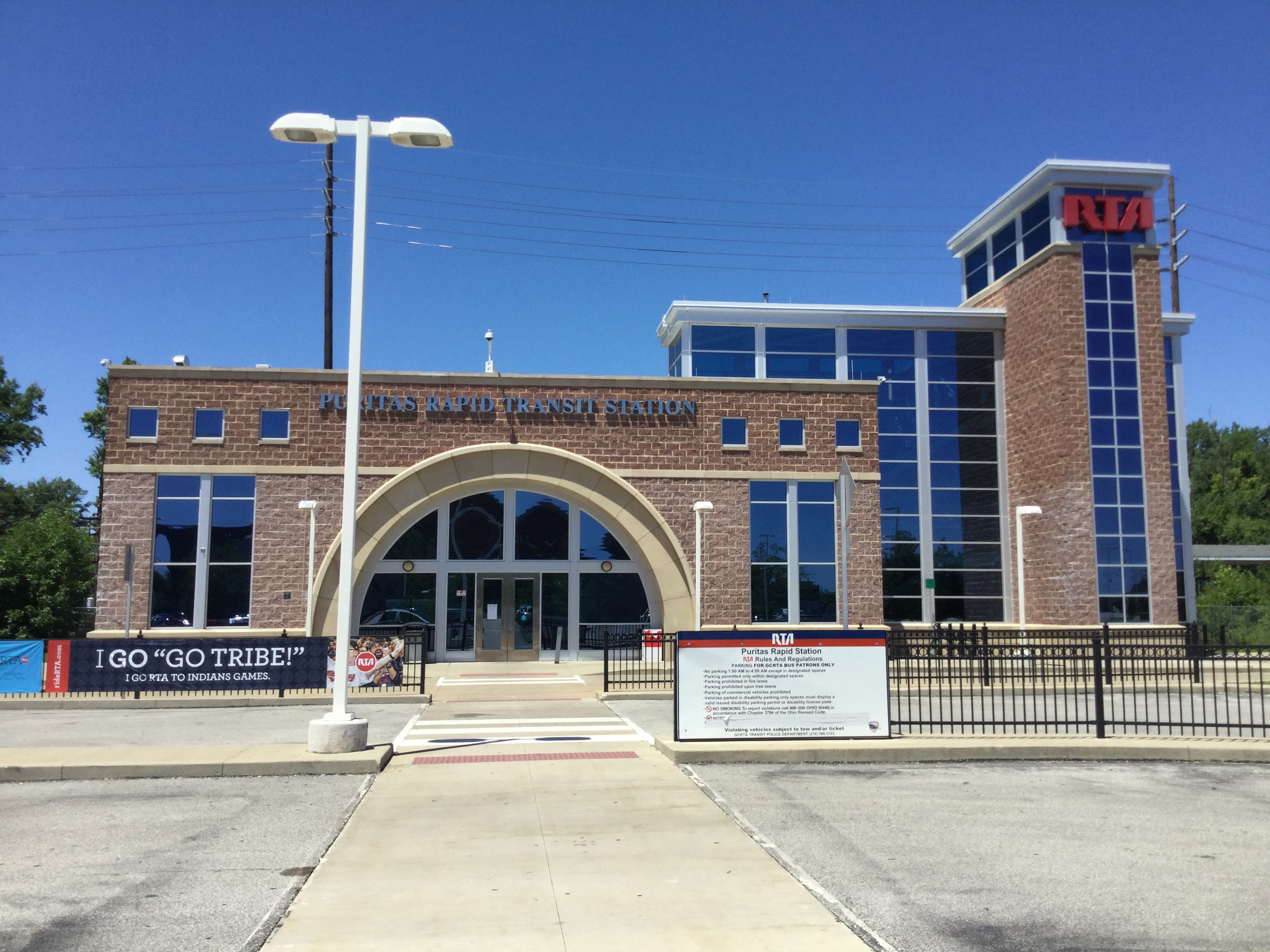
- Puritas–West 150th station house

General information
- Location: 4200 West 150th Street; Cleveland, Ohio
- Coordinates: 41°26′28″N 81°48′21″W
- Owner: Greater Cleveland Regional Transit Authority
- Line: Red Line (Cleveland)
- Platforms: 1 island platform
- Tracks: 2
- Connections: RTA: 78

Construction
- Structure type: At-grade
- Parking: 558 spaces
- Cycle facilities: Racks
- Accessible: Yes

Other information
- Website: riderta.com/facilities/puritas

History
- Opened: November 15, 1968; 57 years ago
- Rebuilt: 2011
- Original company: Cleveland Transit System

Services
Preceding station	Rapid Transit	Following station
Brookpark toward Airport	Red Line	West Park toward Windermere
Location

Puritas–West 150th station (signed as Puritas) is a station on the RTA Red Line in Cleveland, Ohio. It is located at off West 150th Street just north of Interstate 71. The entrance to the station parking lot is off exit/entrance ramp to Interstate 71. There is also an entrance from West 154th Street, connecting the station directly to Puritas Avenue.

== History ==
The station opened with the extension of the CTS Rapid Transit to Cleveland Hopkins International Airport on November 15, 1968. As originally constructed, the headhouse on the northwest side of the parking lot included an escalator to a tunnel leading under the Norfolk Southern (formerly New York Central Railroad) tracks and the eastbound Red Line tracks to a second escalator connecting the platform. The tunnel also extended under the westbound Red Line tracks to another station entrance on a cul-de-sac at the eastern end of Valleyview Avenue.

In 2009, groundbreaking occurred for a renovation of the station, which was completed in May 2011. The new station includes a completely rebuilt headhouse built on the site of the former headhouse as well as a replacement entrance on Valleyview Avenue. The former tunnel was replaced with a bridge over the tracks and public art was installed in parts of the station. To make the station accessible compliant, three elevators, one at each entrance, and one connecting the bridge to the platform, were installed. In addition, the station now includes designated overnight parking.

== Gallery ==
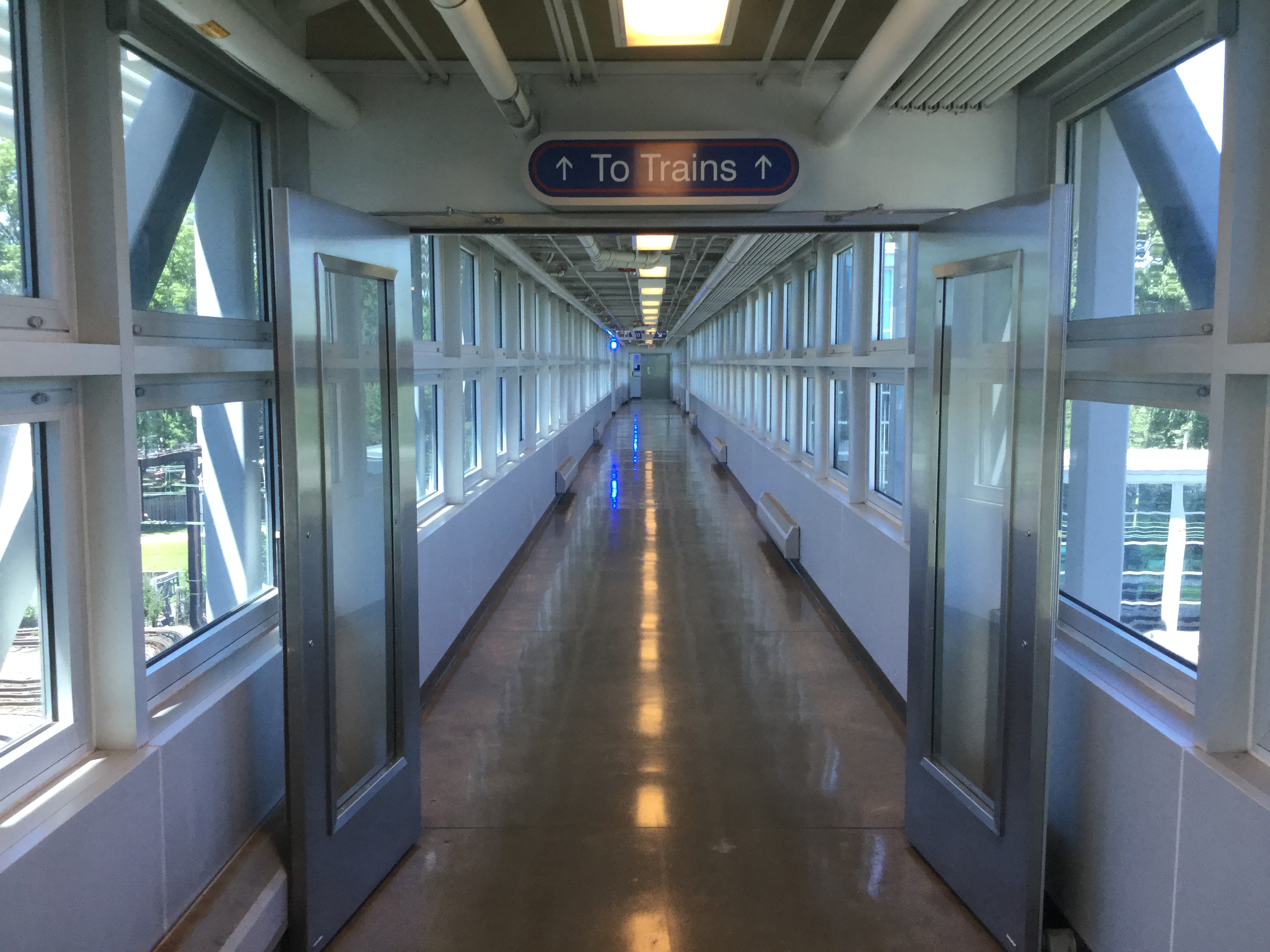

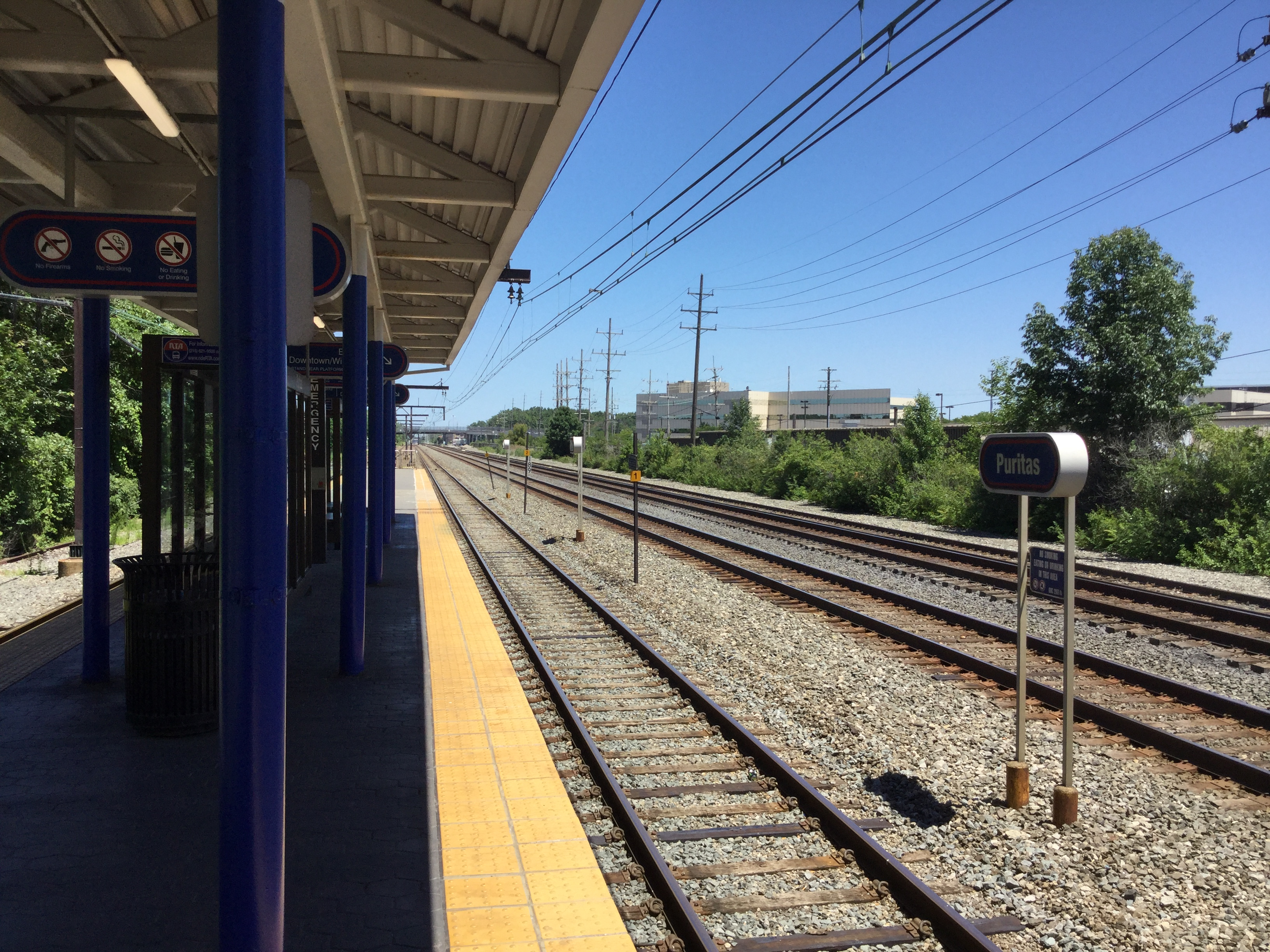

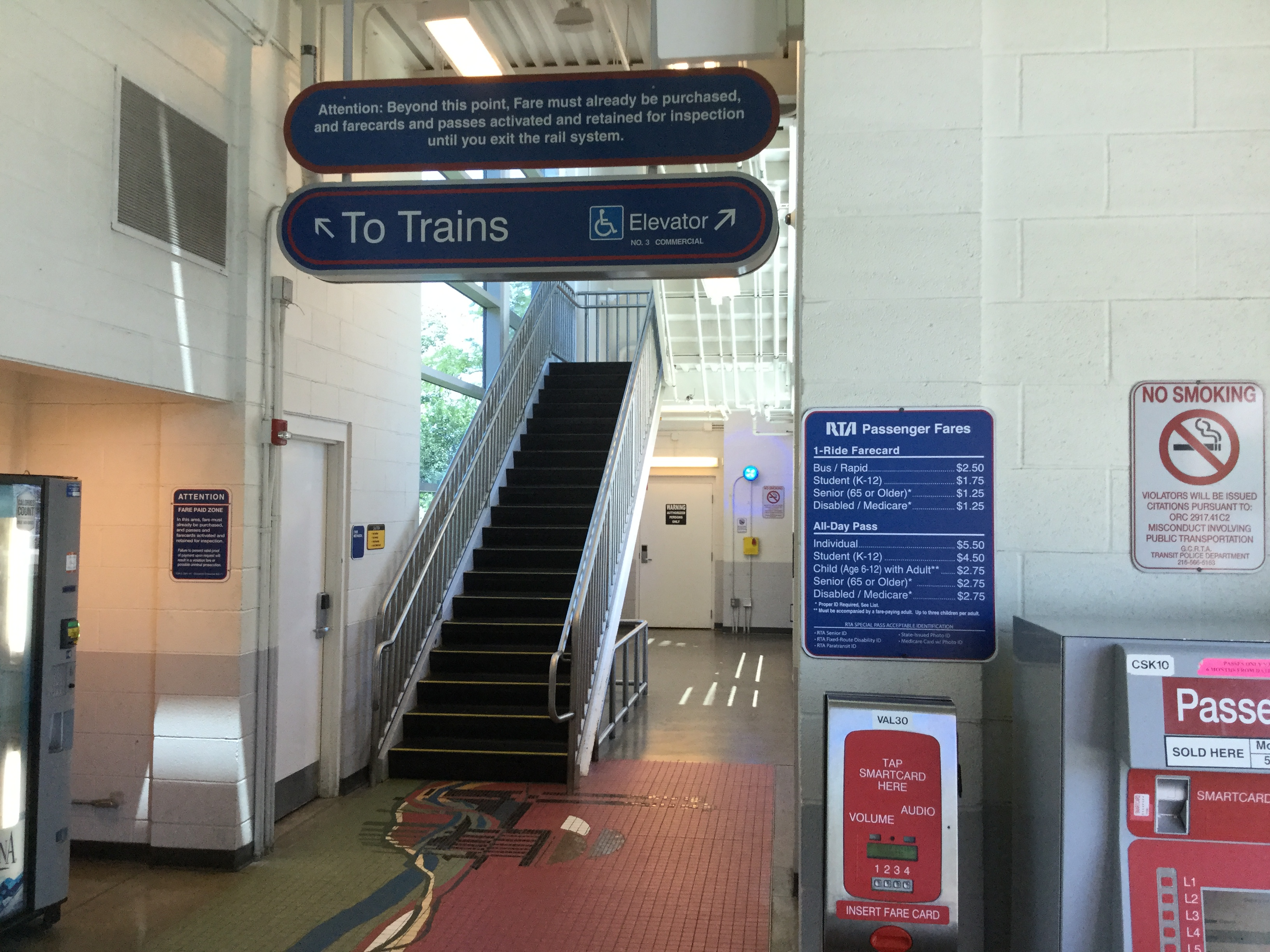

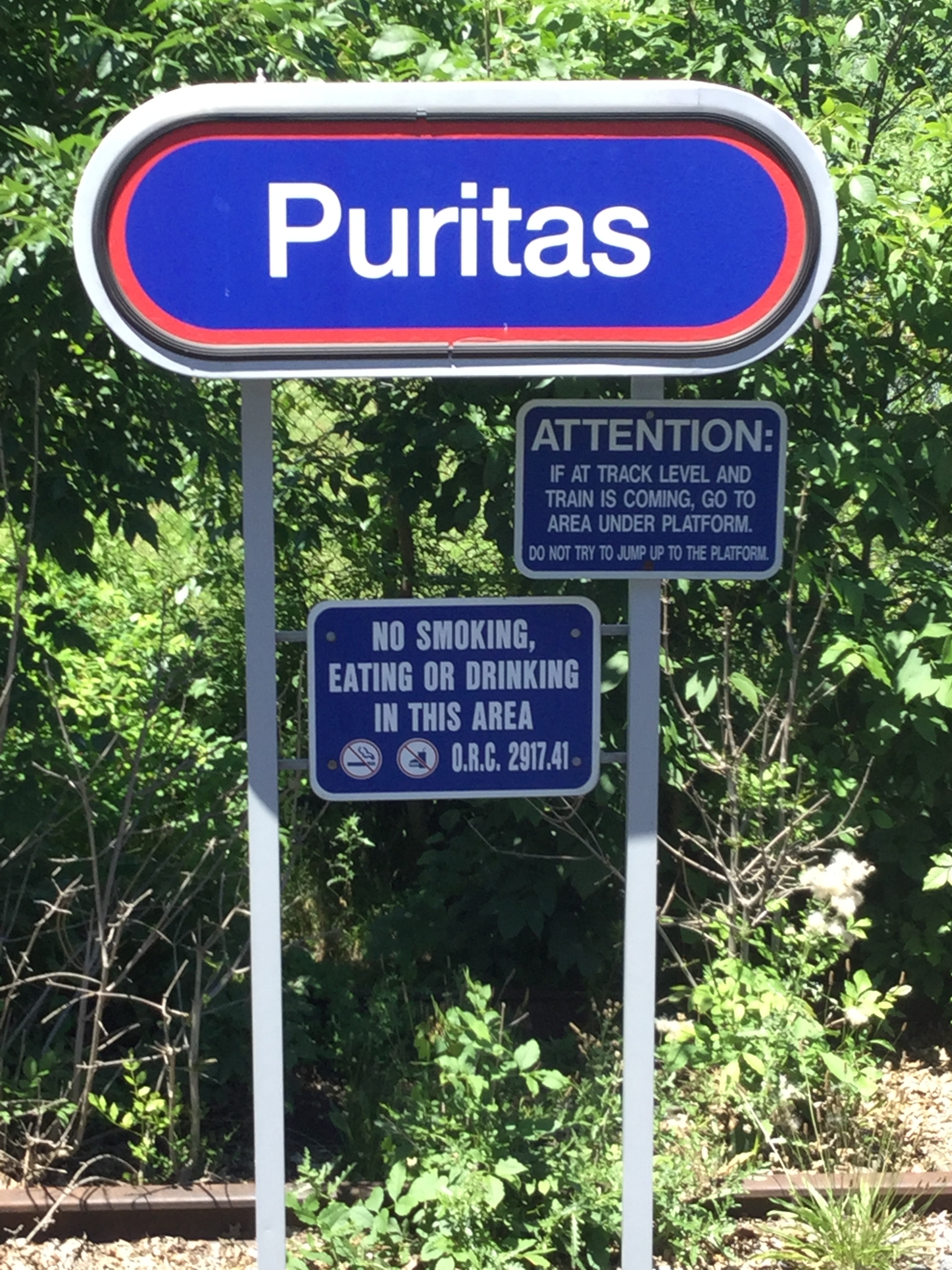

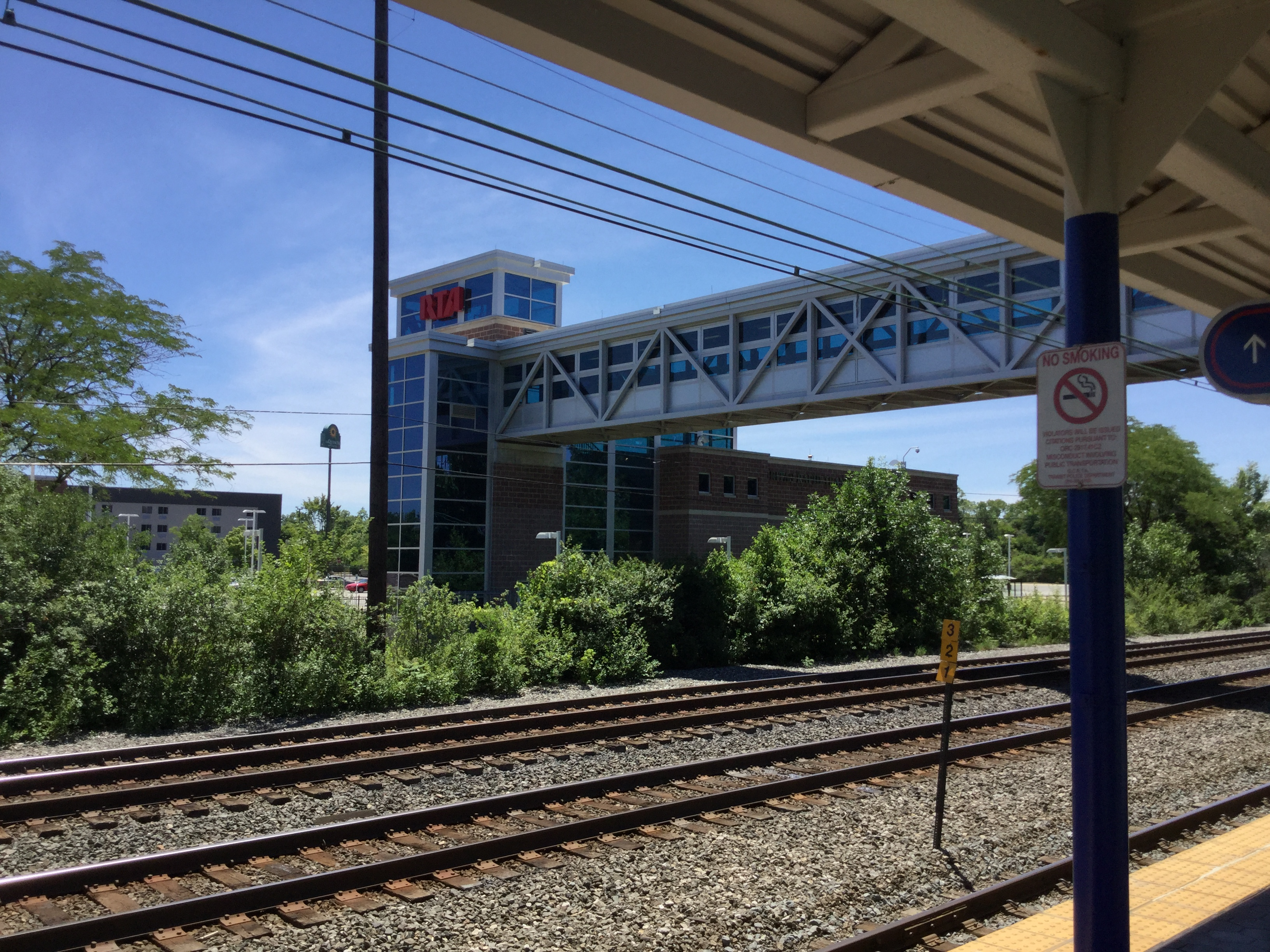

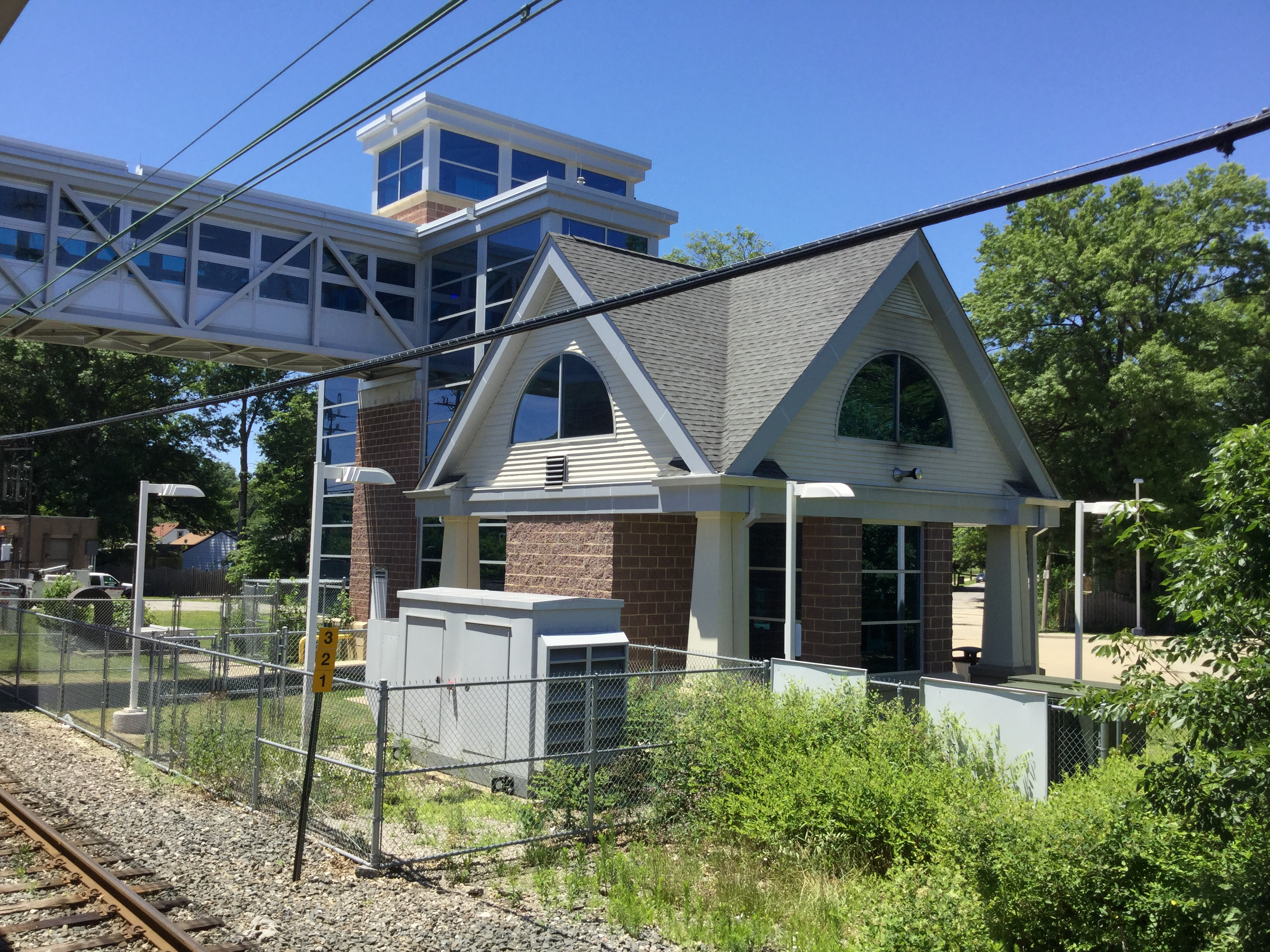

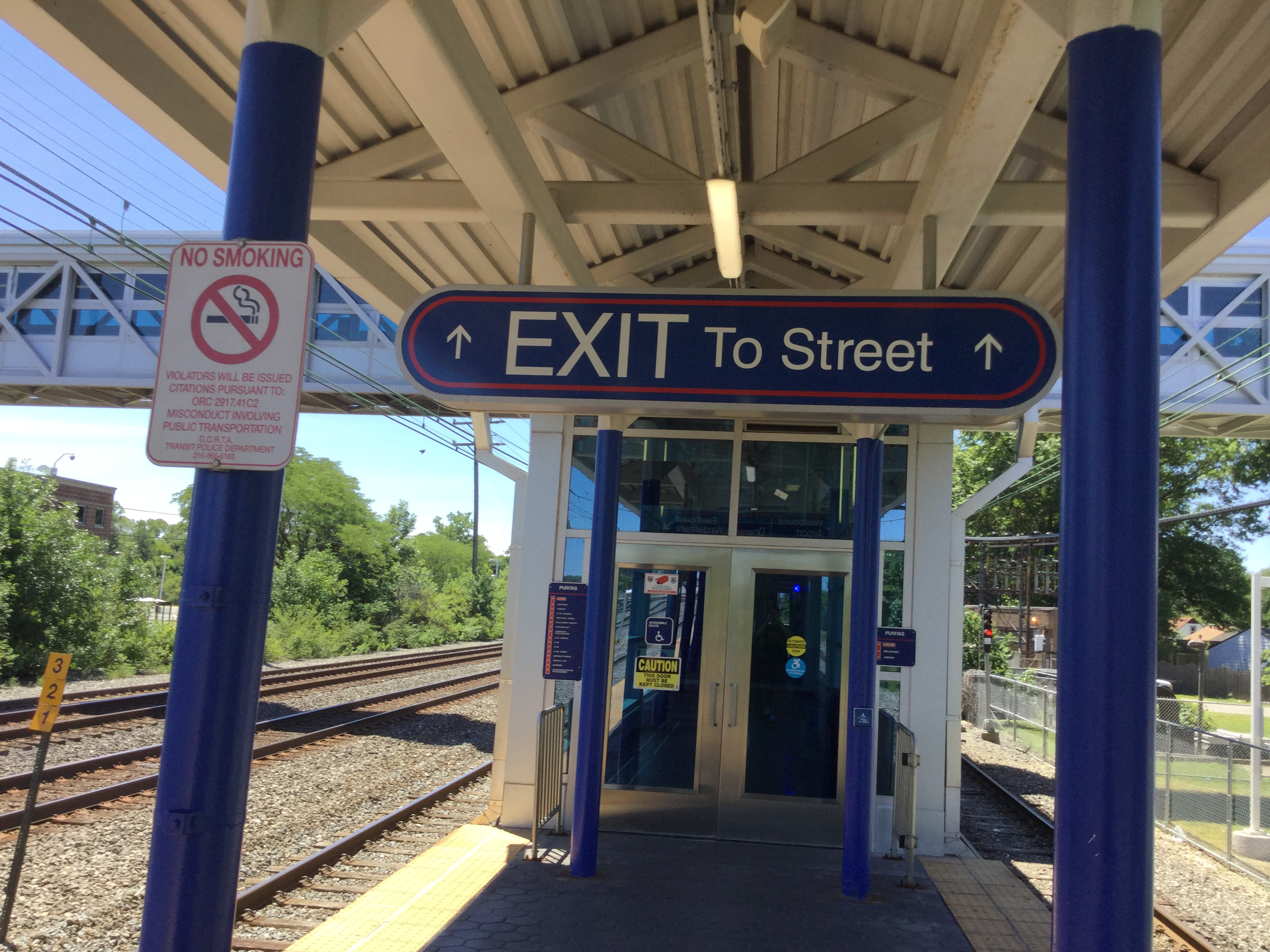

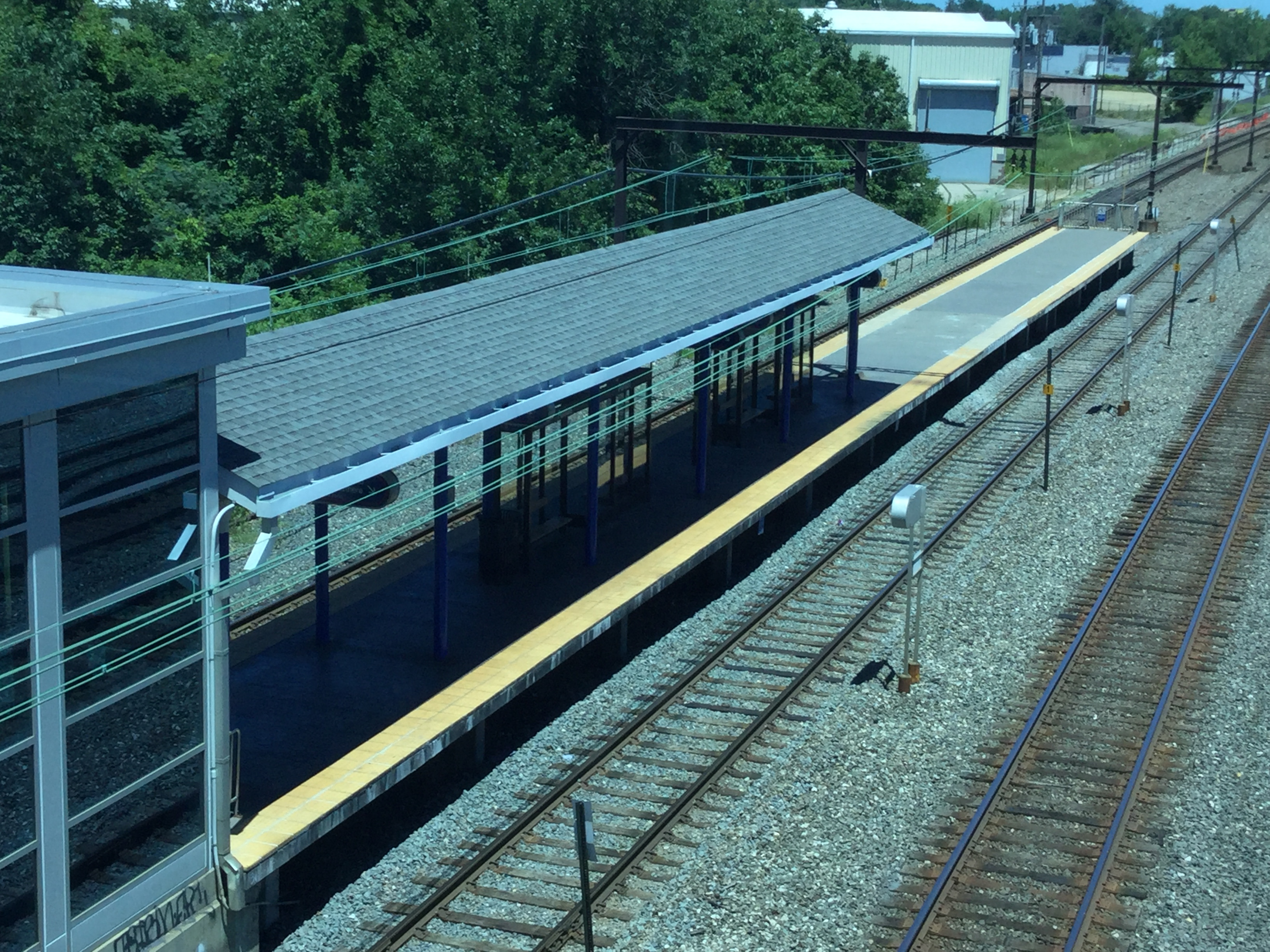
