= Brookpark station =

Rapid transit station in Cleveland

Brookpark
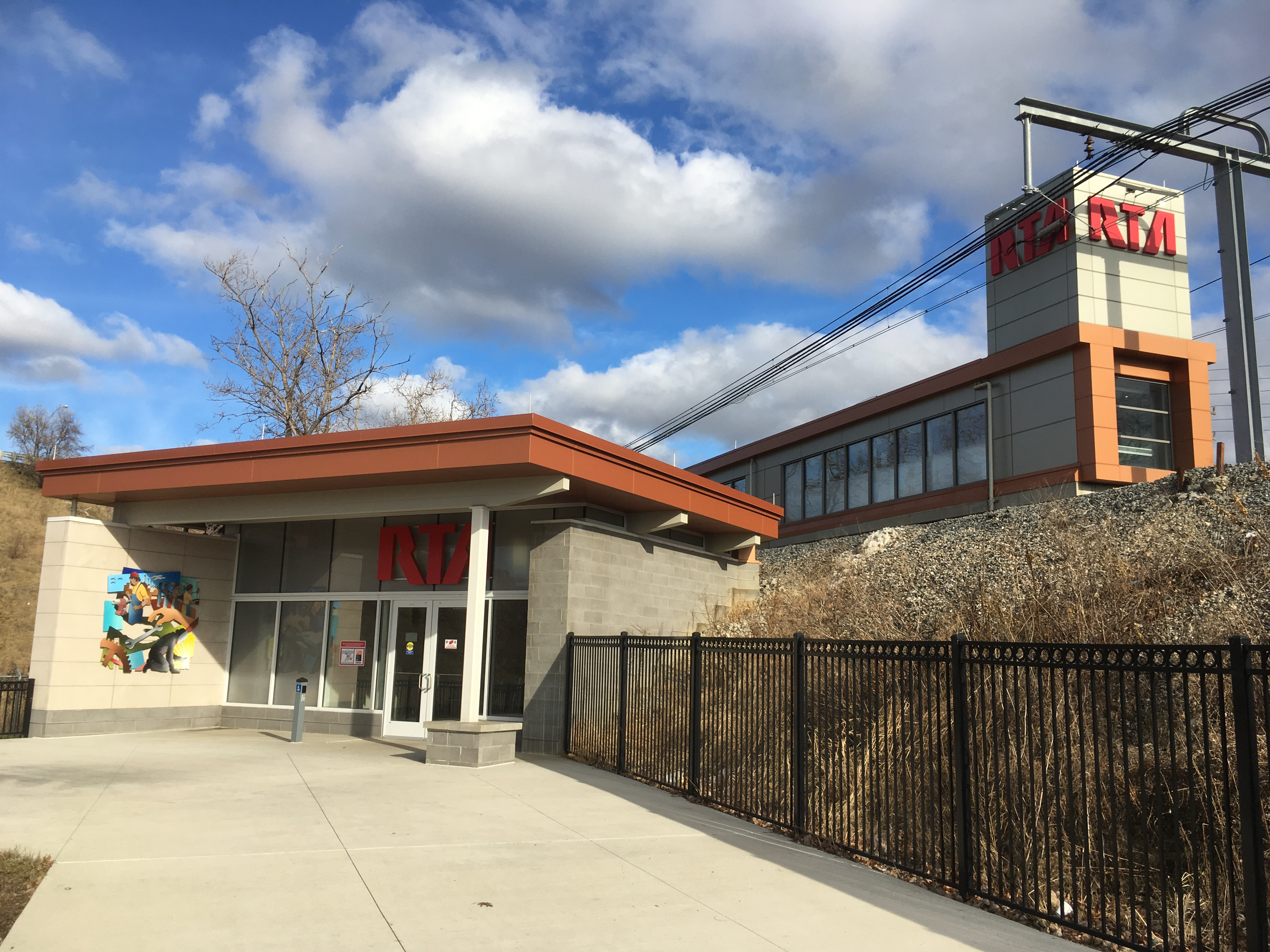
- Brookpark station house with platform in upper right

General information
- Location: 18010 Brookpark Road; Cleveland, Ohio
- Coordinates: 41°25′10″N 81°49′26″W
- Owner: Greater Cleveland Regional Transit Authority
- Lines: NS Chicago Line; NS Cloggsville Line
- Platforms: 1 island platform
- Tracks: 2
- Connections: RTA: 54, 78, 86; GoBus: Gray Line

Construction
- Structure type: Embankment
- Parking: 1,283 spaces (east), 322 spaces (west)
- Cycle facilities: Racks
- Accessible: Yes

Other information
- Website: riderta.com/facilities/brookpark

History
- Opened: April 20, 1969; 57 years ago
- Rebuilt: 2017
- Original company: Cleveland Transit System

Services
Preceding station	Rapid Transit	Following station
Airport Terminus	Red Line	Puritas–West 150th toward Windermere
Location

Brookpark station is a station on the RTA Red Line located on the borders of Brook Park and Cleveland, Ohio, USA. It is located along Brookpark Road (Ohio State Route 17), west of the intersection of Henry Ford Boulevard (Ohio State Route 291) and east of the intersection of the Berea Freeway (Ohio State Route 237).

It is the westernmost station on the RTA Rapid Transit that includes free parking, and it is the second busiest station on the RTA Rapid Transit system, after Tower City.

== History ==
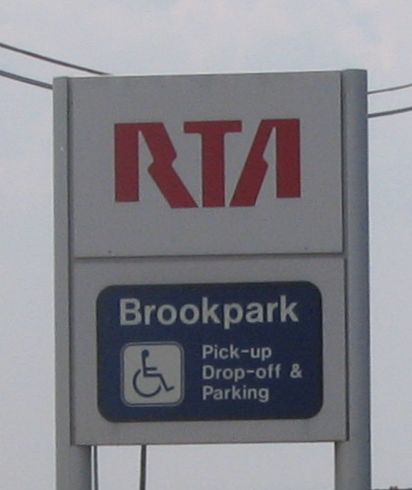
Station sign

The four-mile extension of the CTS Rapid Transit from West Park station to Cleveland Hopkins International Airport was opened in November 1968, but the Brookpark Station was not opened when this extension was opened. The station opened the following spring on April 20. The station lobby and parking lot were originally located on the northeast side of the tracks and connected to the platform by a tunnel extending under the eastbound track and the adjacent tracks of Norfolk Southern.

In 2000, RTA announced plans for a $7.5 million renovation of the station, similar to other Red Line stations that have been or are being rebuilt. The plans called for closing the present station and building a temporary station on the other side of the tracks. The temporary station was erected, and the old station closed, but further plans for a new station were sidetracked.

In 2005, the RTA Board approved a letter of intent to build a permanent station as a part of a larger transit-oriented development, which includes hotels, restaurants and other commercial venues. The agreement provided for the completion of the new station in three years, but due to the poor economy, this development has not yet been realized.

In March 2011, the early stages of a design for the renovation of the station were approved and in October 2011, RTA announced that the agency had received federal funds to repave the parking lot and bus station pavement.

A $1.2 million federal stimulus grant paid for a completely new station. The upgrades included rebuilt entrances, a new platform, a new tunnel under the tracks to remove the grade crossing, better lighting, landscaping and sidewalk improvements, better waiting areas, and improvements to the parking area to improve car and pedestrian mobility. The new eastern entrance and rail platform opened to the public on April 10, 2017.

== Station layout ==
Brookpark has a single island platform for the Red Line. At the south end of the platform is an enclosed waiting area and a staircase and elevator. The island platform is accessed by a tunnel underneath the tracks, connecting it to both the eastern and western parking lots on either side of the station. All buses serving Brookpark stop at the bus bay on the eastern side of the station.

== Intermodal Transit Center (2026) ==
Following the closure of the historic Cleveland Greyhound Station on Chester Avenue on February 4, 2026, the Brookpark station site was expanded to serve as the city's primary intercity bus terminal.

The new facility, located at 17510 Brookpark Road on a former overflow parking lot, was developed through a partnership between the Greater Cleveland Regional Transit Authority (GCRTA) and intercity carriers including Greyhound Lines, and Barons Bus Lines. This relocation provides a direct connection between long-distance bus routes, the RTA Red Line, and RTA mass transit bus routes, facilitating transfers to Cleveland Hopkins International Airport and Tower City Center. While the Brookpark terminal serves as the main regional hub, carriers maintain a secondary curbside stop in downtown Cleveland on East 12th Street to ensure continued access to the central business district.

== Notable places nearby ==
- Cleveland Engine
