= West Park station =

Rapid transit station in Cleveland

West Park
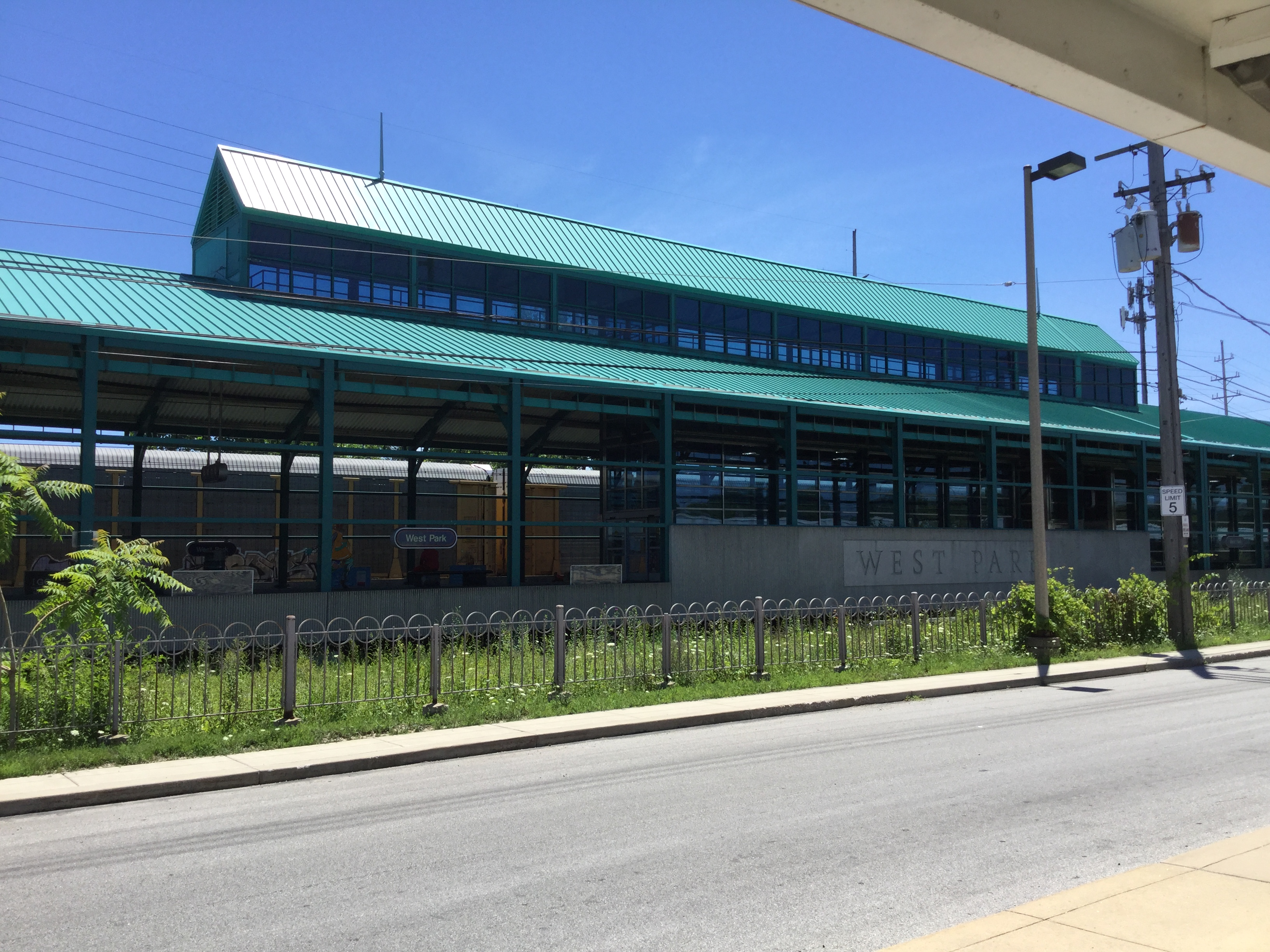
- West Park station platform

General information
- Location: 14510 Lorain Road; Cleveland, Ohio
- Coordinates: 41°27′25″N 81°47′34″W
- Owner: Greater Cleveland Regional Transit Authority
- Line: NS Chicago Line
- Platforms: 1 island platform
- Tracks: 2
- Connections: RTA: 22, 83, 86

Construction
- Structure type: At-grade
- Parking: 351 spaces
- Cycle facilities: Racks
- Accessible: Yes

Other information
- Website: riderta.com/facilities/westpark

History
- Opened: November 15, 1958; 67 years ago
- Rebuilt: 1996
- Original company: Cleveland Transit System

Services
Preceding station	Rapid Transit	Following station
Puritas–West 150th toward Airport	Red Line	Triskett toward Windermere
Former services
Preceding station	New York Central Railroad	Following station
Berea Terminus	Old Main Line	Cleveland toward Nottingham
Location

West Park station is a station on the RTA Red Line in Cleveland, Ohio. It is located off Lorain Avenue just west of West 143rd Street in the West Park neighborhood.

The station includes a large parking lot accessible from Lorain Avenue. The access road has been named Lloyd Peterson Lane. A station lobby building is located on the southeast side of the parking lot adjacent to the tracks. The station headhouse includes bus loading areas and also houses a training facility, which opened in 1983. The headhouse is connected to the platforms by a tunnel extending underneath the westbound track.

== History ==
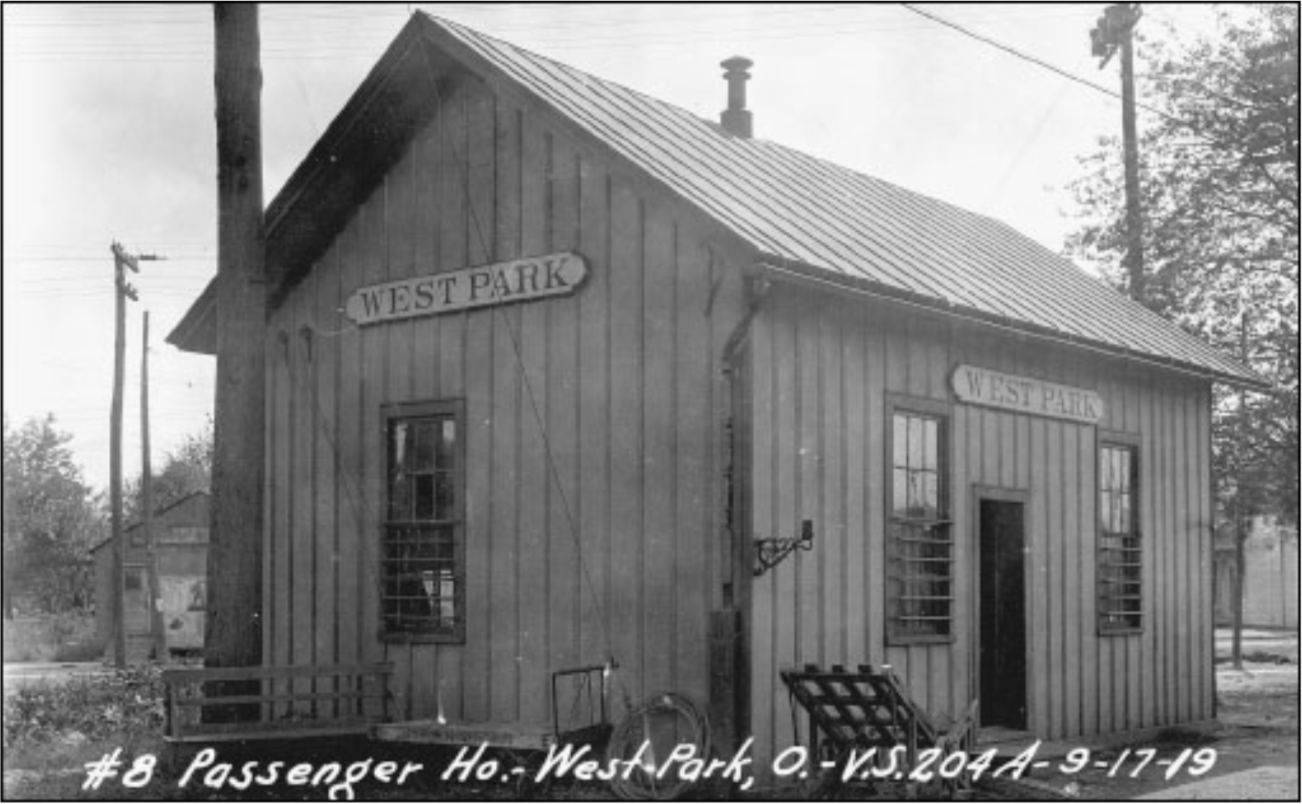
West Park station in 1919

The CTS Rapid Transit was extended to West Park station on November 15, 1958, and the station functioned as the western terminus of the line for ten years. There was a small rail yard just southwest of the station. When the line was extended to Cleveland Hopkins International Airport in 1968, the yard was removed, and a new yard was built just beyond Brookpark station. The station building was connected to the platform by a tunnel extending under the westbound track.

In May 1996, RTA completed a $4-million renovation of the station that made it accessible to people with disabilities.

== Notable places nearby ==
- John Marshall High School
