= Red Line (RTA Rapid Transit) =

Rapid transit line in Cleveland, Ohio

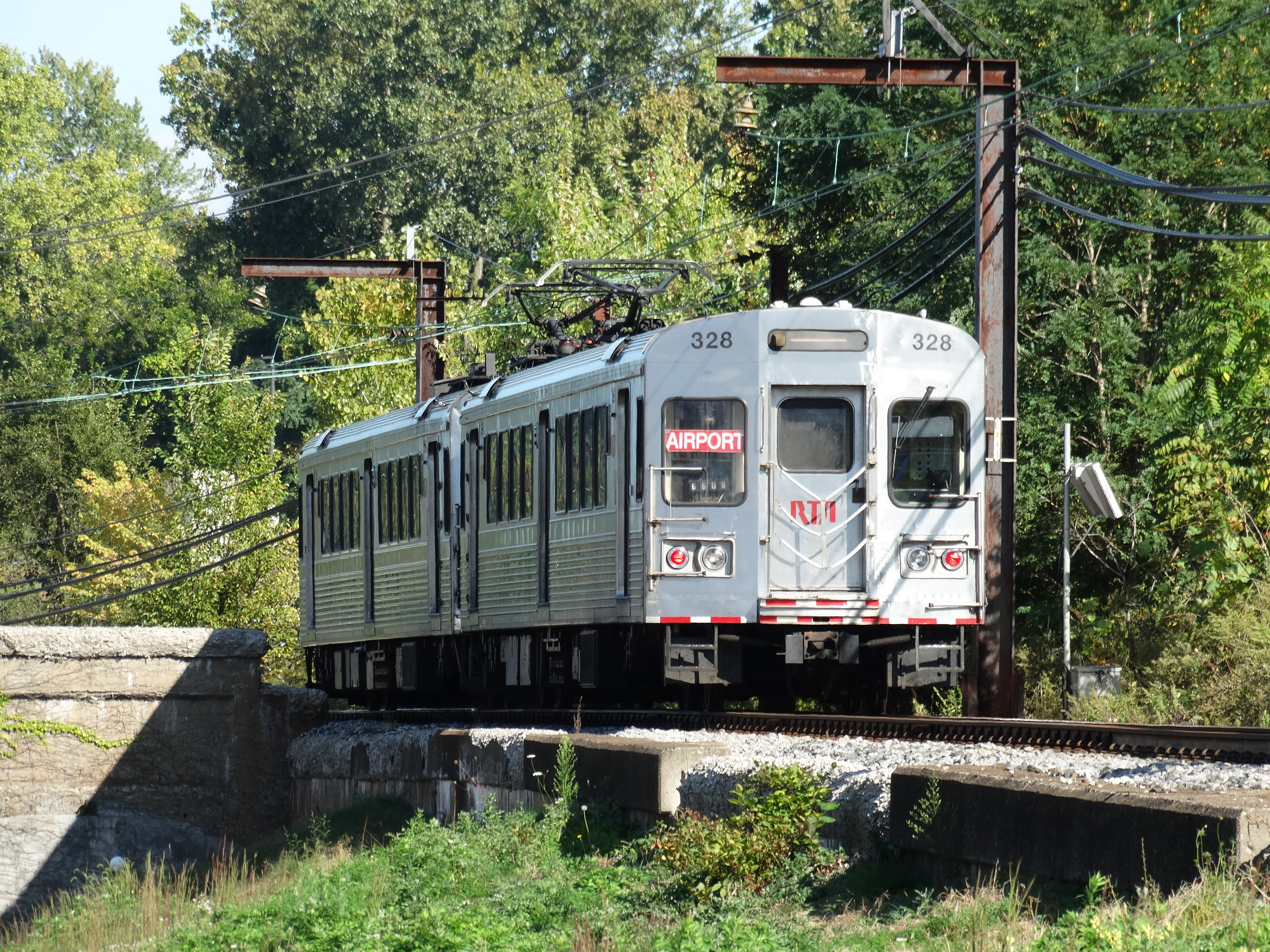
- A Red Line train departing East 55th station

Overview
- Owner: Cleveland Transit System (1955–1975); Greater Cleveland Regional Transit Authority (1975–present)
- Locale: Cleveland and East Cleveland, Ohio
- Termini: Airport; Windermere
- Stations: 18

Service
- Type: Rapid transit
- System: RTA Rapid Transit
- Rolling stock: 40 Tokyu HRVs
- Daily ridership: 9,300 (weekdays, Q2 2026)
- Ridership: 2,860,500 (2025)

History
- Opened: March 15, 1955; 71 years ago
- Last extension: 1968

Technical
- Line length: 19 mi (31 km)
- Number of tracks: 2
- Track gauge: 4 ft 8 1/2 in (1,435 mm) standard gauge
- Electrification: Overhead line, 600 V DC
- Operating speed: 60 mph (97 km/h)
Route map
Red Line highlighted in red

The Rapid Red Line (formerly and internally known as Route 66, also known as the Airport–Windermere Line) is the sole rapid transit line of the RTA Rapid Transit system in Cleveland, Ohio. It runs from Cleveland Hopkins International Airport northeast to Tower City in downtown Cleveland, then east and northeast to Windermere. The Red Line shares 2.6 miles (4.2 km) of track with the light rail Blue and Green lines, including the Tri-C–Campus District and East 55th stations. These stations have high platforms for Red Line trains and low platforms for Blue and Green Line trains.

The Red Line is built primarily within or alongside former railroad rights-of-way. It uses the pre-1930 right-of-way of the New York Central between Brookpark and West 117th Street, the Nickel Plate right-of-way between West 98th and West 65th streets, and the post-1930 New York Central right-of-way between West 25th Street and Windermere. The line is electrified by overhead lines and cars use a pantographs to collect power, with trains operated using one-person operation. In 2025, the line had a ridership of 2,860,500, or about 9,300 per weekday as of the second quarter of 2026.

As of 2026, the Red Line is being prepared for a transition from rapid transit to light rail vehicles.

== History ==
The corridor along which the Red Line runs had been planned for use since before 1930 when the Cleveland Union Terminal opened. The first short section, between East 34th and East 55th Streets, was in use by the Cleveland Interurban Railroad in 1920, and in 1930 the line between East 34th and the Union Terminal was completed. Planning efforts were boosted by increased transit ridership during World War II, and the city approved a scheme in 1946 which called for a single subway line. Cleveland's streetcar system was abandoned leading up to the subway's opening, as it was believed the cost did not justify the limited ridership capacity operating concurrently with the new system. It was not until March 15, 1955, that the eastern half of the Red Line opened, from the existing line near East 55th northeast next to the New York, Chicago and St. Louis Railroad (Nickel Plate Road) to Windermere. The line from downtown southwest to West 117th Street opened on August 15, 1955. This line ran next to the Nickel Plate to the crossing of the New York Central Railroad near West 101st Street, and then next to the New York Central. On November 15, 1958, an extension to West Park opened, and the final section, continuing to Cleveland Hopkins International Airport, opened in 1968, the first airport rail link in North America.

== Schedule and headways ==
The Red Line runs from approximately 3:15 a.m. to 1:45 a.m. daily. Trains run approximately every 15 minutes all day every day.

== Rolling stock ==
The Red Line uses a fleet of 40 (originally 60) stainless-steel subway-type cars manufactured by Tokyu Car Corporation and delivered to RTA between 1984 and September 1985. The cars have three sets of doors on each side, one in the center and one at each end. The cars' exteriors originally had orange and red stripes along the sides, but these stripes were removed when RTA changed to a red, white, and blue color scheme. All cars are built as single vehicles. 20 of the cars are dual-ended and they are numbered 181–200. The other 40 cars are single-ended, and they are numbered 301–340. Dual-ended cars can operate independently, while single-ended cars can only operate coupled to another car at the non-cab end. Trains are typically two cars long, but can be operated with up to three.

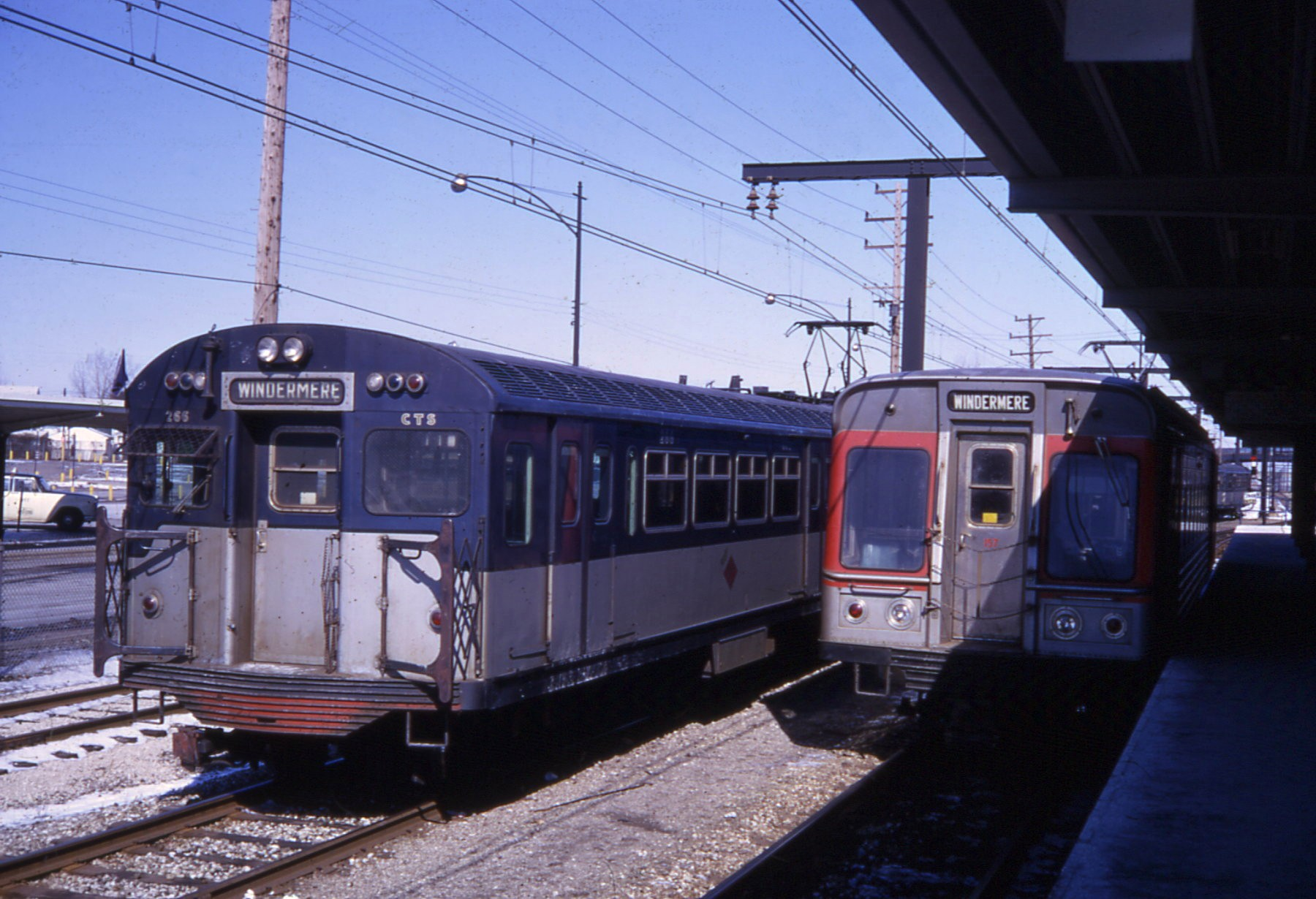
Red Line cars at the West Park station in 1968

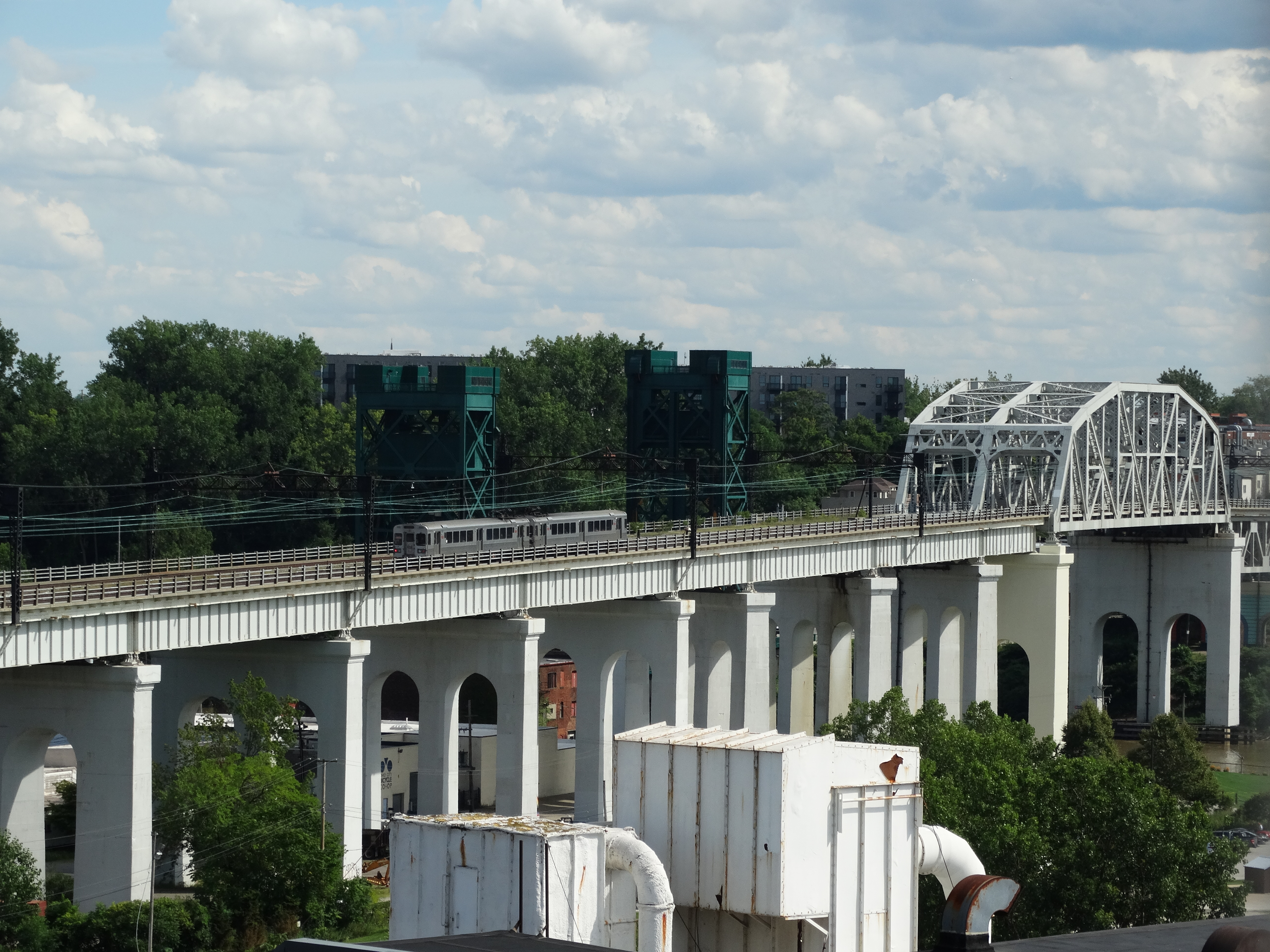
A Red Line train crossing the Union Terminal viaduct

The current fleet of Red Line cars underwent an in-house rehabilitation under the direction of the former director of rail Michael Couse. The cars were overhauled over the course of five years using federal grant money. Cars received pantographs and controllers, along with rebuilt trucks, traction motors, resistor banks, new flame-retardant flooring, LED lighting, new seat frames, revised interior paneling, and additional open space for improved ADA compliance. The first of the rebuilt cars was unveiled to the public on December 10, 2013.

The current cars represent the third generation of cars that have been used on the line. The line opened using a fleet of shorter cars manufactured by the St. Louis Car Company in 1954 and 1955. The cars were 48 1/2 feet (14.8 m) long with blue and gray exteriors and are often referred to as "Blue Birds." They were virtually identical to the cars built by St. Louis Car at the same time for what is now the MBTA's Blue Line. Twelve cars were operable as single units with cabs at each end, and 56 cars operable as pairs. The single units were numbered as 101–112, and the paired units as 201–256. Additional cars in this fleet were purchased in 1958 when the line was extended to West Park. These comprised six additional single unit cars (numbers 113–118) and 14 additional double unit cars (numbers 257–270).

When the extension to Hopkins Airport was being built in 1967, a fleet of 20 longer cars was purchased to supplement and replace the Blue Birds. These second-generation cars, numbered 151–170, were 72 feet (22 m) long and were built by Pullman-Standard Car Manufacturing Company. The cars, which had a stainless steel exterior with red and white trim and featured interior luggage racks, were promoted as "Airporters." The Airporters supplanted the Blue Birds, except during rush hour when extra cars were needed. In 1970, ten additional Airporters were purchased, numbered as 171–180. With the purchase of the Tokyu cars in 1981, all Airporters and Blue Birds were retired starting in 1984.

In April 2019, a study recommended that 34 new cars be procured in 2020 for delivery in 2023, but the subsequent COVID-19 pandemic may have delayed this. During a board meeting in January 2020, a contract was awarded to LTK Consulting to prepare specifications. In September 2020, RTA received $15 million from the federal government for the replacement of both its light (Blue/Green/Waterfront lines) and heavy rail fleet, but the 2019 study suggested it would take $102 million to replace the heavy rail and $96 million to replace the light rail, totaling $198 million. As of the September 2020 post, it was planned a contract would be awarded during the second quarter of 2021, but the contract was not awarded until April 2023, the RTA announced that Siemens would build new S200 cars to replace the current fleet.

In preparation for the new cars' arrival, 18 decommissioned cars (combined light rail and heavy rail) had been scrapped by May 2021.

== Stations ==
All stations are ADA accessible stations.

Station	Date opened	Date rebuilt	Location	Connections / notes
Airport	November 15, 1968	May 1994	Hopkins	Cleveland Hopkins International Airport
Brookpark	April 20, 1969	April 10, 2017	Hopkins/Brook Park	RTA Bus: 54, 78, 86
Puritas–West 150th	November 15, 1968	May 17, 2011	Kamm's Corners/Jefferson	RTA Bus: 78
West Park	November 15, 1958	May 1996	Jefferson	RTA Bus: 22, 83, 86
Triskett	November 15, 1958	August 15, 2000	Kamm's Corners	
West 117th–Madison	August 14, 1955	October 16, 2007	Edgewater/Cudell/Lakewood	RTA Bus: 25, 78
West Boulevard–Cudell	August 14, 1955	April 1999	Edgewater	RTA Bus: 18, 26, 26A
West 65th–Lorain	August 14, 1955	September 21, 2004	Detroit–Shoreway	RTA Bus: 22, 25, 71
West 25th–Ohio City	August 14, 1955	September 1992	Ohio City/Tremont	RTA Bus: 22, 25, 45, 51, 51A
Tower City	March 15, 1955	December 17, 1990	Downtown	RTA Rapid Transit: Blue Green Waterfront; RTA BRT: HealthLine; RTA Bus: 1, 3, 8, 9, 11, 14, 14A, 15, 19, 19A, 19B, 22, 25, 26, 26A, 39, 45, 51, 51A, 53, 53A, 55, 55B, 55C, 71, 77, 90, 251; Laketran: 10, 11, 12; METRO RTA: 61; PARTA: 100; SARTA: 4
Tri-C–Campus District	March 1, 1971	August 18, 2003; September 24, 2018	Central	RTA Rapid Transit: Blue Green; RTA Bus: 15, 19, 19A, 19B
East 55th	March 15, 1955	October 11, 2011	North Broadway	RTA Rapid Transit: Blue Green; RTA Bus: 16
East 79th	March 15, 1955	March 10, 2021	Kinsman	RTA Bus: 2
East 105th–Quincy	March 15, 1955	November 4, 2005	Fairfax	RTA Bus: 8, 10, 11
Cedar–University	March 15, 1955	August 28, 2014	University Circle	RTA Bus: 11, 48, 50
Little Italy–University Circle	August 11, 2015		University Circle	RTA Bus: 9 Replaced Euclid–East 120th station
Superior	March 15, 1955	September 1996	East Cleveland	RTA BRT: HealthLine; RTA Bus: 3, 35, 40
Windermere	March 15, 1955	June 22, 1997	East Cleveland	RTA BRT: HealthLine; RTA Bus: 3, 7, 7A, 28, 28A, 31, 35, 37, 41, 41F

== In popular culture ==
The Red Line is prominently featured in the final scenes of the film Proximity, starring Rob Lowe and James Coburn. The finale involves a hostage on a Red Line train and a gunfight and chase scene through the Tower City station.

== See also ==
- Northern Ohio Railway Museum
