= Cleveland Hopkins International Airport =

Airport in Cleveland, Ohio, United States

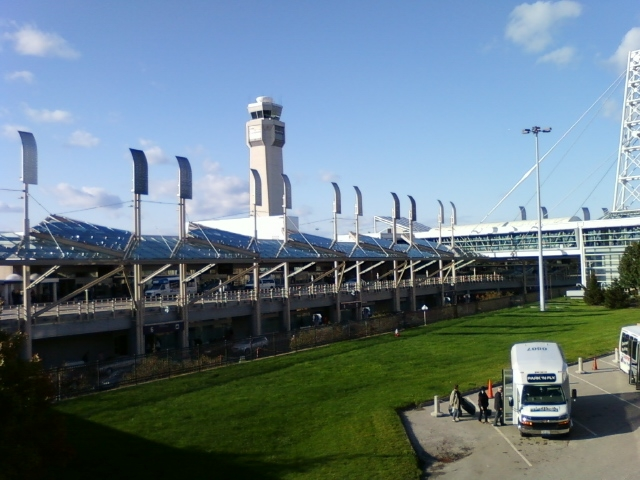
- IATA: CLE; ICAO: KCLE; FAA LID: CLE

Summary
- Airport type: Public
- Owner: City of Cleveland
- Operator: Department of Port Control
- Serves: Greater Cleveland; Northeast Ohio
- Location: Hopkins, Cleveland, Ohio, U.S.
- Opened: July 1, 1925; 101 years ago
- Operating base for: Frontier Airlines
- Coordinates: 41°24′42″N 081°50′59″W
- Public transit access: Red at Airport
- Website: clevelandairport.com

Maps
- FAA airport diagram
- Interactive map of Cleveland Hopkins International Airport

Runways
Direction	Length		Surface
Direction	ft	m	Surface
06L/24R	9,000	2,743	Concrete
06R/24L	9,953	3,034	Concrete
10/28	6,018	1,834	Asphalt/Concrete

Statistics (2025)
- Total passengers: 10,003,833 ▼1.67%
- Aircraft landings: 47,856
- Source: FAA and Cleveland Airport.

Cleveland Hopkins International Airport (IATA: CLE, ICAO: KCLE, FAA LID: CLE) is a city-owned international airport in Cleveland, Ohio, United States, and is the primary airport serving Greater Cleveland and Northeast Ohio. It is the largest and busiest airport in the state, as well as in the top fifty largest airports in the U.S. by passenger numbers. The airport has a passenger catchment area of 4.9 million people. Located in Cleveland's Hopkins neighborhood 9 miles (14 km) southwest of Downtown Cleveland, it is adjacent to the Glenn Research Center, one of NASA's ten major field centers.

The airport has been at the forefront of several innovations that are now commonplace. It was the first airport with an air traffic control tower and a two-level design separating arrivals from departures. It was also the first airport in North America to be directly connected with a rail transit line.

Cleveland was a hub for United Airlines from the post–World War II era until the mid-1980s. After United moved out, Continental Airlines moved in, making it the dominant carrier at the airport in the 1990s and 2000s. In 2010, United and Continental merged, keeping the United name and eliminating the Continental name, resulting in Cleveland becoming a United hub again. However, in 2014, United discontinued its hub, though it still has a flight attendant base, pilot base, and maintenance facilities at the airport and is its largest carrier by passenger count.

When United stopped using Cleveland as a hub, it closed Concourse D, but the airline kept paying to lease the facility. However, United's hub closure created an opening for low-cost carriers to enter the market, which had previously had among the highest average fares in the country. Within a few years after United closed the hub, passenger traffic rebounded to where it had been before the closure.

Cleveland Hopkins offers non-stop passenger service to 43 destinations. Cleveland Hopkins is operated by the Cleveland Department of Port Control, which also operates Burke Lakefront Airport located downtown.

Cleveland Hopkins International Airport was founded on July 1, 1925, and celebrated its 100th anniversary on July 1, 2025.

== History ==
Cleveland Hopkins is of particular importance to the history of commercial air travel due to a number of first-in-the-world innovations that would eventually become the global standard. Founded on July 1, 1925, it was one of the first municipality-owned facilities of its kind in the United States. It was the site of the first air traffic control tower (1929), the first ground-to-air radio control system (1939), and the first airfield lighting system (1930), and it was the first U.S. airport to be directly connected to a local or regional rail transit system (1968).

It was also the first airport to employ a two-level terminal design separating arrivals from departures. The airport was named after its founder, former city manager William R. Hopkins, on his 82nd birthday in 1951.

=== First closure of United hub, establishment of Continental hub ===
United Airlines established its easternmost domestic hub in Cleveland after World War II, which it maintained until the mid-1980s, when it closed its Cleveland hub and moved capacity to a new hub at Washington–Dulles. Following the closure of the United hub, Continental Airlines (which at the time was a separate carrier and lacked a Midwest hub) responded by adding capacity to Cleveland, as did USAir, which was the dominant carrier at the airport from 1987 until the early 1990s. While USAir soon reduced its schedule from Cleveland, Continental substantially increased its hub capacity, becoming the airport's largest tenant and eventually accounting for upwards of 60 percent of passenger traffic. Continental and the airport both made substantial operational and capital investments in the airport's infrastructure. In 1992, the airport completed a $50 million renovation of Concourse C, which housed all of Continental's flights. The renovation included the installation of a continuous skylight, a Continental President's Club lounge, and a new Baggage Claim area. In 1999, the airport completed an $80 million expansion that included the construction of the new Concourse D (now closed), which was built to accommodate Continental Express and Continental Connection flights.

In June 1999, Continental Airlines launched flights to London's Gatwick Airport aboard a Boeing 757-200. This was Cleveland's first scheduled transatlantic service, since the 1992 discontinuation of JAT's DC-10 service to Ljubljana and Belgrade, Serbia. The carrier suspended the link after the September 11 attacks and resumed it in April 2002. The following year, Continental made the route seasonal.

Continental began flying into London's Heathrow Airport instead of Gatwick in May 2009; Heathrow offered more connecting flights. The airline discontinued the service four months later, citing the recession and an inability to obtain affordable seasonal slots at Heathrow. The company was also about to join the Star Alliance, to which United Airlines belonged. Consequently, London-bound passengers would be able to transit through United's Chicago hub instead of Cleveland. The cancellation of the route left the city without a direct link to Europe until 2018.

=== United—Continental merger, second closure of United hub ===
On May 2, 2010, Continental and United Airlines announced that they would merge operations, completing the integration by October 1, 2010. The merger resulted in the United name being kept and the Continental name disappearing, prompting concerns that a post-merger United would reduce or close its hub in Cleveland and instead route passengers through the new United's Chicago-O'Hare and Washington-Dulles hubs. On November 10, 2010, United/Continental CEO Jeff Smisek stated in a speech in Cleveland that "Cleveland needs to earn its hub status every day" and added that overall profitability would be the determining factor in whether the new United kept or closed the Cleveland hub.

At its peak, United served 68 destinations from Cleveland. United continued to reduce its capacity in Cleveland following the merger, which already had been substantially reduced in the wake of the 2008 financial crisis. On February 1, 2014, United announced that the airline would shut down its Cleveland hub, stating as justification that the airline's hub at Cleveland "hasn't been profitable for over a decade." By June 5, 2014, United had effectively terminated its hub operation at the airport, reducing its daily departures by more than 60%. United also closed Concourse D and consolidated all of its remaining operations in Concourse C, although it is required to continue to pay the airport $1,112,482 a month in rent for the facility until 2027.

=== Post-hub history ===
The airport initially experienced a sharp decline in passenger counts following the closure of United's hub in 2014. Several other airlines, however, increased their service to Cleveland in subsequent years. Frontier Airlines significantly increased its service to the airport and declared Cleveland a focus city. New routes connected Cleveland with destinations as far as Luis Muñoz Marín International Airport in San Juan, Puerto Rico. In November 2023, Frontier Airlines announced it would make Cleveland a crew base in March 2024, employing up to 110 pilots, 250 flight attendants, and 50 aircraft maintenance personnel.

Other low-cost airlines such as Spirit Airlines and Allegiant Air began new service to the airport as well, and existing airlines such as American Airlines, Delta Air Lines, and Southwest Airlines also increased their number of daily flights and destinations. As a result, by 2017, the airport's passenger count exceeded levels achieved during the last full year that United maintained a hub in Cleveland.

Despite the closure of its hub, as of 2017 United still maintained roughly 1,200 employees in Greater Cleveland, including a flight attendant and pilot base as well as maintenance facilities. United also remains the largest carrier at Hopkins. Regional airline CommuteAir, which flies exclusively on behalf of United Express, is headquartered in nearby Westlake, Ohio.

Icelandair and Wow Air inaugurated flights to Reykjavík in May 2018. Wow Air employed Airbus A321s on the route, while Icelandair used a Boeing 737 MAX. Wow Air left Cleveland in October 2018 amid financial troubles. Icelandair decided to make its service seasonal, with the first season ending in October. In March 2019, however, the carrier announced it would not be returning. The Boeing 737 MAX had been grounded, and some analysts said Icelandair might have been dissatisfied with the route's performance.

In 2021, the airport received $32.5 million from the Federal Aviation Administration to provide economic relief funds for costs related to operations, personnel, cleaning, sanitization, janitorial services, debt service payments, and combating the spread of pathogens during the COVID-19 pandemic.

In May 2023, Aer Lingus launched flights between Cleveland and Dublin on Airbus A321LR aircraft. It is currently the only nonstop transatlantic flight between Europe and Cleveland.

In 2023, Cleveland was one of the areas where United Airlines pilots picketed in pursuit of a better contract.

Frontier overtook United for the #1 spot in passengers carried monthly in June 2024. Given financial troubles and a new bankruptcy, Spirit Airlines announced it would cease operations at the airport, effective April 15, 2026. On March 18, 2026, Avelo Airlines announced it was inaugurating new service at Cleveland Hopkins, beginning June 19, 2026.

== Facilities ==
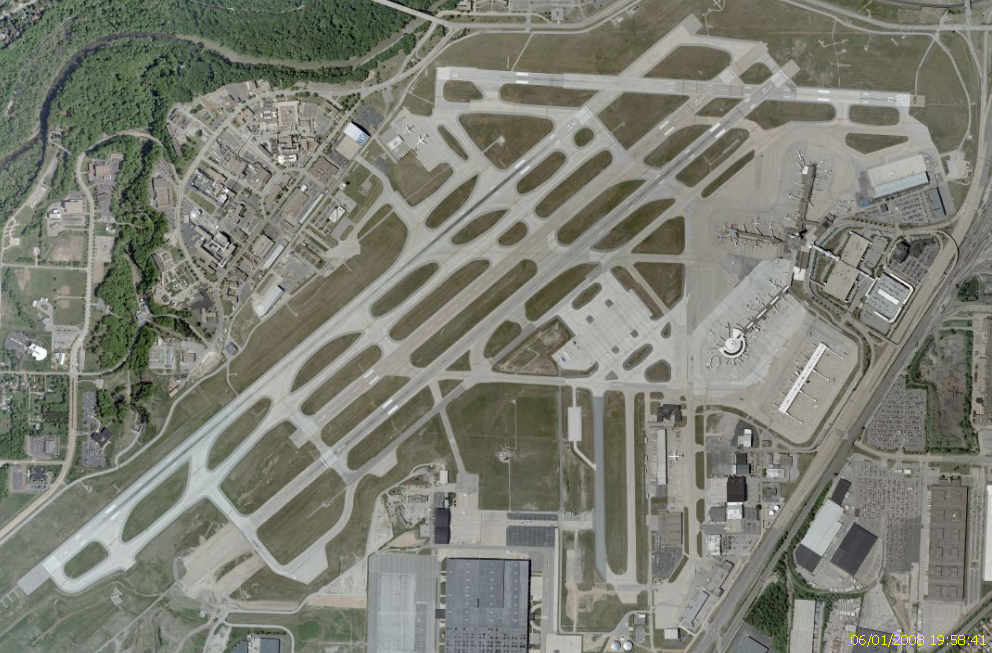
Satellite view of the airport in 2004

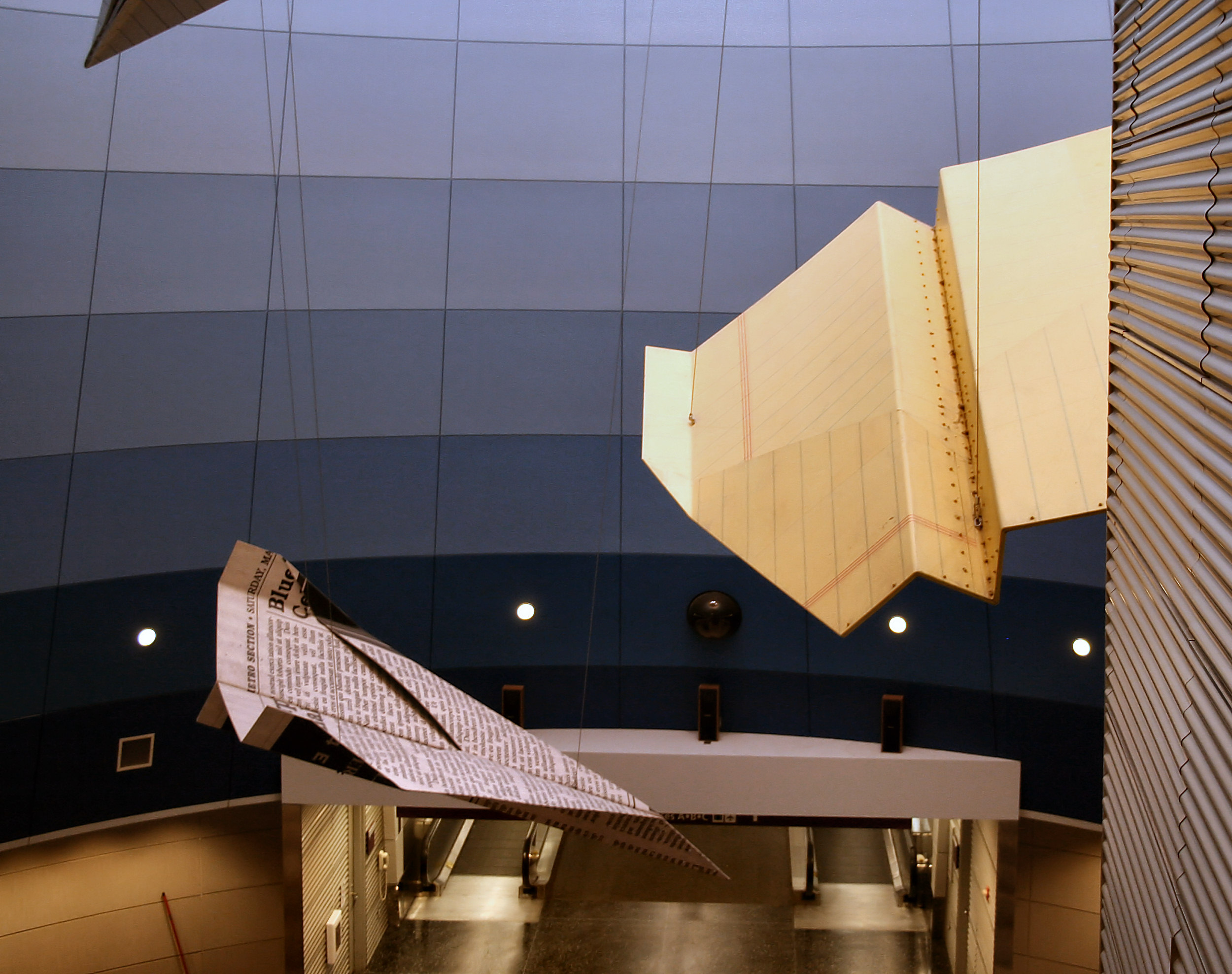
Hopkins Airport's giant "paper" airplane sculptures, located in the underground walkway between Concourses C and D (now closed to the public).

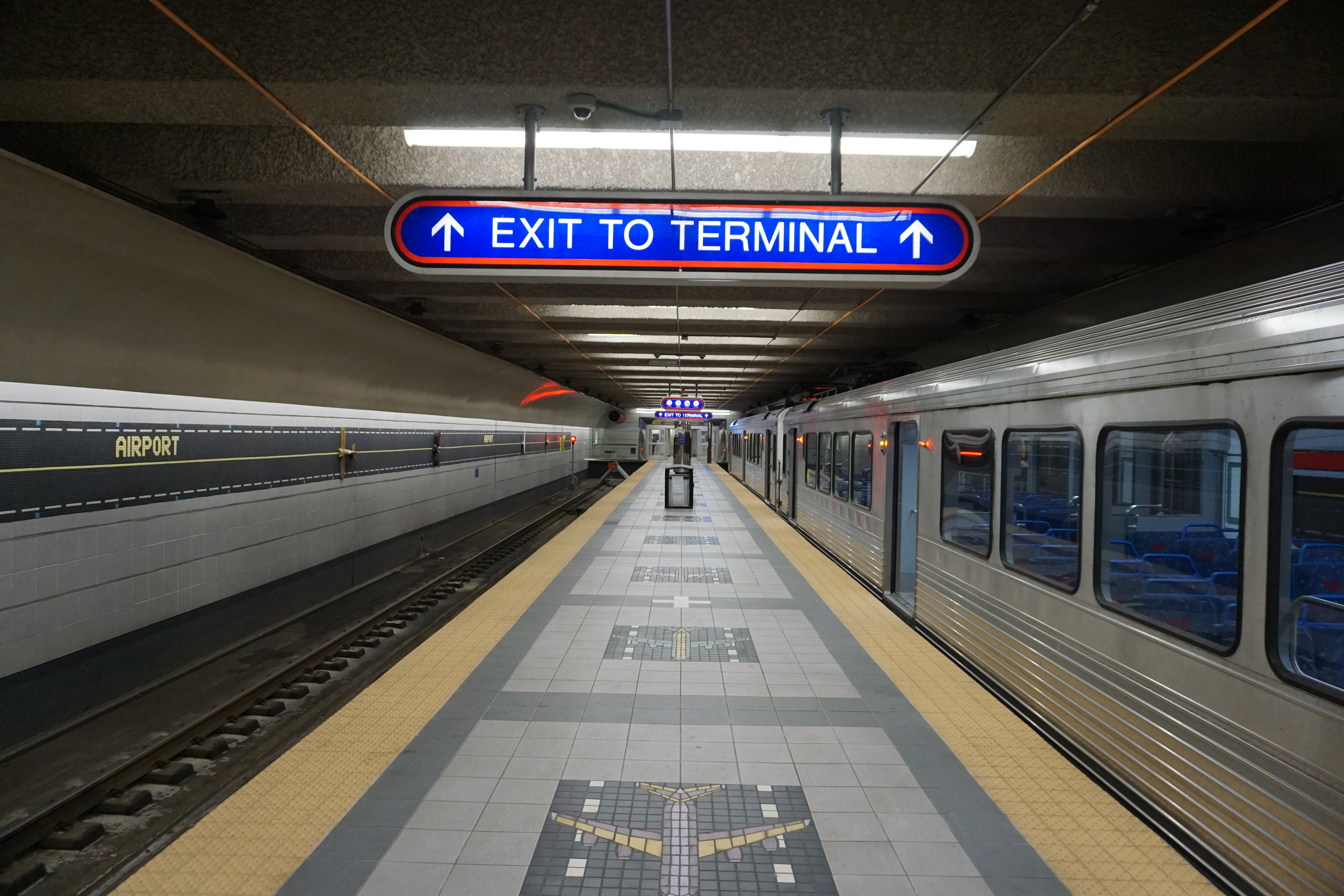
The Cleveland RTA's Airport station.

=== Terminal ===
Cleveland Hopkins consists of one two-level passenger terminal, which was completed in 1978, and renovated in 2016. There are four concourses, three of which are currently in use. There are three security checkpoints: one for each active Concourse. Passengers can move freely, airside between Concourse A, B and C after passing security.

- Concourse A houses Avelo, Frontier, and all non-preclearance international arrivals. Delta Air Lines also uses it for overflow parking and sports charters. It also houses the airport's Federal Inspection Services (FIS) customs and border protection facility. Originally known as "North Concourse", it was opened in 1957 and rebuilt in 1978–79.
- Concourse B houses Delta and Southwest. Originally the “West Concourse”, it was built in 1954 as the first extension pier to the airport, and was rebuilt and expanded from 1982 to 1983.
- Concourse C houses Aer Lingus, Air Canada Express, Alaska, American, JetBlue and all United services, except for non-preclearance international arrivals which are handled in Concourse A. Originally known as "South Concourse", it opened in 1969 and was renovated in 1992.
- Concourse D has been vacant since 2014, when United closed its gates and consolidated all operations to Concourse C. Built in 1999, it is a separate terminal connected to Concourse C by an underground walkway. Although capable of handling larger jets such as the Boeing 737, it exclusively handled smaller regional aircraft during its operation. Concourse D contains 12 jet bridge gates and 24 ramp loading positions.

In 2022, the airport began discussions for a $2 billion renovation. The airport wanted to expand security and check-in counters, add an improved checked baggage inspection system, expand gate waiting areas, and add 8 new gates to be able to accept additional flights. Concourses A and C will be renovated, concourse B would be rebuilt, and a new concourse would be built to replace Concourse D.

=== Runways ===
Cleveland Hopkins covers an area of 1,717 acres (695 ha) and has three runways:

- 06R/24L: 9,953 ft × 150 ft (3,034 m × 46 m) concrete
- 06L/24R: 9,000 ft × 150 ft (2,743 m × 46 m) concrete
- 10/28: 6,018 ft × 150 ft (1,834 m × 46 m) asphalt/concrete

=== Other facilities ===
Cleveland Hopkins is home to both crew and maintenance bases for United Airlines.

The airport is also home to one of five kitchens operated by airline catering company Chelsea Food Services, a subsidiary of United Airlines.

Cleveland Airmall, a unit of Fraport USA, manages the retail and dining locations at the airport. Tenants include Johnston & Murphy, Great Lakes Brewing Company, Rock & Roll Hall of Fame Museum Store, Bar Symon, and Sunglass Hut.

A former Sheraton Hotel also occupied the airport grounds immediately east of the terminal. Built in 1959, it had 243 rooms and was a popular layover point for passengers and crews during the airport's hub days with United and Continental. The hotel closed in June 2022 after its ownership group defaulted on its loans. The airport subsequently acquired the building and it has since been demolished.

The airport has two lounges: a United Club in Concourse C, and The Club CLE near the entrance to Concourse B in the Main Terminal.

=== Ground transportation ===
The airport is connected to the Cleveland Rapid Transit system with the Red Line Rapid Transit station beneath the terminal. The airport has a dedicated taxi service of 110 vehicles. In 2023, the airport received $3.2 million in federal funding to renovate, among other terminal facilities, the public transportation tunnel to the airport. This will include modernizing wall surfaces, replacing the tunnel ceiling and waterproof membrane in the tunnel tramway, structural repairs, and installation of a new drainage system.

Rental car operations are located at a consolidated rental car facility off the airport property. Shuttle services are provided between the airport and the facility.

== Expansion ==
=== CLEvolution: Phase 1 (2025–2032) ===
In 2025, airport authorities and the City of Cleveland announced a seven-year, $1.6 billion project to rebuild Cleveland Hopkins' landside facilities. Construction commenced in June 2026 and include the following projects:

- New 1,600 space Gold Lot adjacent to Concourse D
- New 6,000 space parking garage on site of current Orange Lot
- Demolition of existing Smart Parking Garage
- New and relocated GCRTA Red Line station
- New Ground Transportation Center
- New $1.1 billion terminal headhouse on site of current Smart Parking Garage

All landside improvements except for work on the terminal will be completed by 2029. During this time, the new headhouse will be designed. Once the existing Smart Parking Garage is demolished, the new headhouse and arrivals and departures roadways will begin construction targeting completion in 2032.

== Airlines and destinations ==
=== Passenger ===
Airlines	Destinations
Aer Lingus	Dublin
Air Canada Express	Toronto–Pearson; Seasonal: Montréal–Trudeau
Alaska Airlines	Seattle/Tacoma
American Airlines	Charlotte, Chicago–O'Hare, Dallas/Fort Worth, Los Angeles, Miami, Phoenix–Sky Harbor; Seasonal: Philadelphia
American Eagle	Chicago–O'Hare, New York–JFK, New York–LaGuardia, Philadelphia, Washington–National; Seasonal: Charlotte, Miami
Avelo Airlines	Charlotte/Concord, New Haven
Delta Air Lines	Atlanta, Minneapolis/St. Paul, Salt Lake City
Delta Connection	Boston, Detroit, Minneapolis/St. Paul, New York–JFK, New York–LaGuardia
Frontier Airlines	Atlanta, Cancún, Denver, Fort Lauderdale, Fort Myers, Las Vegas, Miami, Orlando, Phoenix–Sky Harbor, Punta Cana, Raleigh/Durham, Tampa; Seasonal: San Juan (resumes December 17, 2026)
JetBlue	Boston, Fort Lauderdale, New York–JFK
Southwest Airlines	Baltimore, Chicago–Midway, Dallas-Love (begins March 11, 2027), Denver, Las Vegas, Nashville, Orlando, Phoenix–Sky Harbor, St. Louis
United Airlines	Cancún, Chicago–O'Hare, Denver, Fort Lauderdale, Houston–Intercontinental, Las Vegas, Los Angeles, Newark, Orlando, San Francisco, Washington–Dulles; Seasonal: Fort Myers, Miami (resumes December 3, 2026), Tampa
United Express	Chicago–O'Hare, Newark, Washington–Dulles; Seasonal: Houston–Intercontinental

== Statistics ==
=== Airline market share ===
Largest airlines at CLE (January 2025 – December 2025)
Rank	Carrier	Percentage	Passengers
1	United Airlines	23.14%	2,184,000
2	Frontier Airlines	21.26%	2,007,000
3	Southwest Airlines	13.35%	1,260,000
4	American Airlines	11.11%	1,049,000
5	Delta Air Lines	9.61%	907,000
	Other	21.52%	2,031,000

=== Top destinations ===
Busiest domestic routes from CLE (January 2025 – December 2025)
Rank	City	Passengers	Carriers
1	Atlanta, Georgia	455,360	Delta, Frontier, Southwest
2	Chicago–O'Hare, Illinois	402,780	American, United
3	Orlando, Florida	297,080	Frontier, Spirit, Southwest, United
4	Denver, Colorado	277,350	Frontier, Southwest, United
5	Dallas/Fort Worth, Texas	227,490	American, Frontier
6	Charlotte, North Carolina	218,320	American, Frontier
7	New York-LaGuardia, New York	185,470	American, Delta, Frontier
8	Newark, New Jersey	180,320	United
9	Fort Lauderdale, Florida	161,490	Frontier, Spirit, United
10	Las Vegas, Nevada	159,730	Frontier, Southwest

=== Annual passenger traffic ===
Annual passenger traffic at CLE 1999–Present
Year	Passengers	Year	Passengers	Year	Passengers
1999	13,020,285	2009	9,715,604	2019	10,040,817
2000	13,288,059	2010	9,492,455	2020	4,122,517
2001	11,864,411	2011	9,176,824	2021	7,283,896
2002	10,795,270	2012	9,004,983	2022	8,695,234
2003	10,555,387	2013	9,072,126	2023	9,868,868
2004	11,264,937	2014	7,609,404	2024	10,173,861
2005	11,463,391	2015	8,100,073	2025	10,003,833
2006	11,321,050	2016	8,422,676	2026	
2007	11,459,390	2017	9,140,445	2027	
2008	11,106,196	2018	9,642,729	2028	

== Accidents and incidents ==
- On May 24, 1938, United Air Lines Flight 9, a Douglas DC-3 flying from Newark to Chicago via Cleveland crashed on approach to Cleveland, killing all seven passengers and three crew members on board.
- On August 27, 1971, a Chicago & Southern Airlines Volpar Turboliner (Beechcraft Model 18) with 2 occupants on board suffered a loss of power on the no.1 engine shortly after takeoff. It stalled and crashed killing 1 crew member of the 2 on board.
- On December 18, 1978, an Allegheny Commuter DeHavilland Heron (operated by Fischer Brothers Aviation) was landing at Cleveland from Mansfield Lahm Airport when a ground controller cleared a snow plow to cross the runway at the same time the aircraft was landing, resulting in a collision. The flight had a crew of 2 pilots and 15 passengers. There were no fatalities nor serious injuries. The aircraft was damaged beyond repair.
- On January 4, 1985, an armed 42-year-old Cleveland woman named Oranette Mays hijacked Pan Am flight 558, a Boeing 727 scheduled to fly from Cleveland to New York City's John F. Kennedy International Airport. During the boarding process for the flight in Cleveland, Mays shot her way onto the plane, shooting and injuring a USAir employee who tried to stop her in the process. Mays then commandeered the plane, took 7 hostages (including an 8-month-old baby), and demanded to be taken to Rio de Janeiro, Brazil. After a 6-hour stand-off, a SWAT team made up of Cleveland police and FBI agents stormed the plane. Mays and an officer were shot before police were able to arrest Mays.
- On February 17, 1991, Ryan International Airlines Flight 590, a McDonnell Douglas DC-9-15 cargo flight bound for Indianapolis International Airport stalled and crashed after takeoff from CLE due to wing contamination. While the DC-9 was on the ground for 35 minutes, there was no de-icing service on the aircraft and blowing snow accumulated on the wings, causing a stall and loss of control on takeoff. Both occupants were killed.
- On December 15, 1992, a Mohican Air Service Volpar Turboliner II (Beechcraft Model 18) on a ferry flight crashed after its initial climb, the sole occupant was killed. Improper installation of the elevator during recent maintenance on the aircraft was the probable cause.
- On January 6, 2003, a Continental Express Embraer ERJ 145LR overran the runway upon landing from Bradley International Airport in Windsor Locks, CT. The airplane continued beyond the departure end, on the extended runway centerline, and struck the ILS runway 6 localizer antenna. It came to rest with the nose about 600 feet (180 m) beyond the end of the runway. The nose landing gear had collapsed rearward and deformed the forward pressure bulkhead.
- On November 29, 2004, an Embraer EMB-135BJ sustained substantial damage during a ground collision with a parked airplane while taxiing after landing at the Cleveland-Hopkins International Airport. While exiting taxiway "J" with the co-pilot steering the airplane from the left seat, the airplane entered a ramp area where scheduled maintenance was to be performed. However, another EMB-135BJ had been parked perpendicular to the ramp entrance, with its nose wheel approximately 30 feet from the front of a hangar, and with its tail approximately 45 feet from the edge of the ramp pavement. According to written statements provided by the flight crew, per their standard operating procedures, they waited at the ramp entrance for a marshaller to assist them in parking. When one did not arrive, they decided to pass behind the parked airplane slowly, but while the pilot attempted to verbally direct the co-pilot and observe the position of the right wingtip, the airplane's right winglet collided with the parked airplane. The probable cause of the incident was found to be the pilot in command's improper decision to continue taxi without a ground marshaller, and her misjudged clearance from a parked airplane, which resulted in a ground collision during taxi.
- On February 18, 2007, Delta Connection Flight 6448, an Embraer E 170 operated by Shuttle America with 4 crew members and 71 passengers aboard, landed at CLE in snowy weather and gusty winds. Despite the use of full reverse and braking, the aircraft didn't slow down, left the runway and partially went through a fence 150 feet from the end of the runway. There were no fatalities. Even though the aircraft was substantially damaged, it was repaired and put back into service.
- On July 26, 2016, a flight attendant on an Embraer E170 inbound to Cleveland Hopkins was injured after an inadvertent encounter with turbulence. The aircraft landed safely.
- On November 23, 2022, an area man broke onto airport property, drove onto a runway, and destroyed radar equipment at the airport.

== Controversies ==
=== Ground Transportation Center ===
In May 2015, the airport moved the pick-up and drop off location for most shuttles to the former limo lot, requiring most passengers to take two escalators underneath the former shuttle parking in the arrivals lane at the airport. Originally meant to be a temporary fix, the airport made the Ground Transportation Center a permanent fixture in May 2017. This angered many travelers, who complained on various social media platforms, as well as local media outlets, garnering negative publicity for the airport's plans. In March 2019, the pick up and drop off locations for most of the shuttles (except for limo shuttles) have moved to the north end of the baggage claim level.

=== Parking ===
In May 2013, the airport demolished its aging, 2,600-space Long Term Garage, replacing it with a 1,000 space surface lot for $24 million. This in turn created a parking shortage. The airport converted the Short Term Garage to a so-called Smart Garage and valet parking garage. The airport eliminated its free half-hour courtesy parking perk, and began to charge $3 for a half-hour.

=== Terminal Renovation ===
In October 2026, an expanded conceptual masterplan for the airport's $3 billion, two-decade Terminal Modernization Development Program was published on the city's CLEvolution website. The plan would replace the three active concourses (A, B, and C, with 46 gates) with two new concourses of about 20 gates each, for a total of 40, with room to add gates if demand warrants. It would also relocate rental cars to an on-site facility, replacing the Maplewood Avenue facility used since 1998.

== See also ==
- Ohio World War II Army Airfields
- List of tallest air traffic control towers in the United States
