= Airport station (GCRTA) =

Rapid transit station in Cleveland

Airport
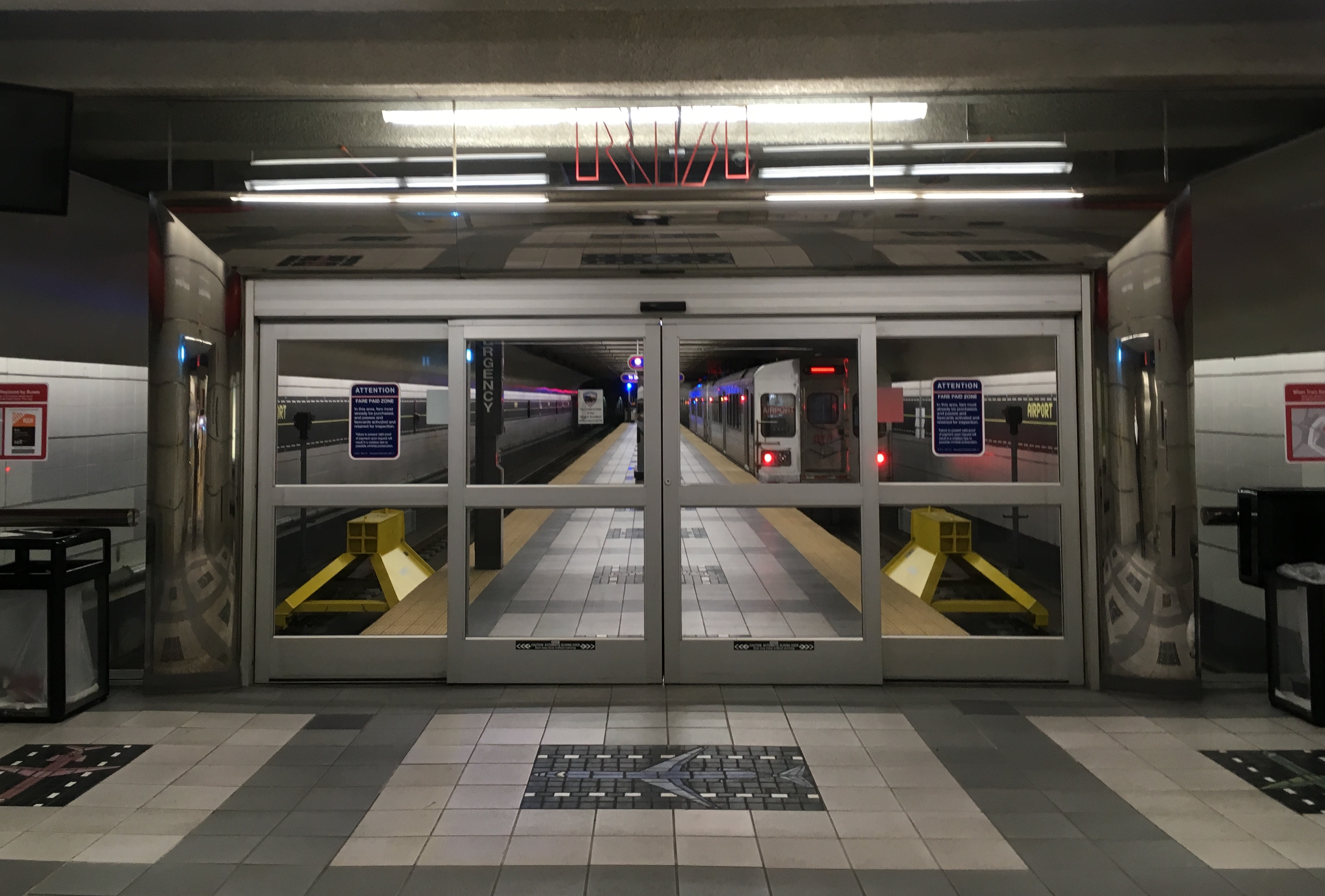
- Entrance to Airport station

General information
- Location: 5300 Riverside Drive; Cleveland, Ohio
- Coordinates: 41°24′40″N 81°50′15″W
- Owner: Greater Cleveland Regional Transit Authority
- Platforms: 1 island platform
- Tracks: 2

Construction
- Structure type: Underground
- Parking: Paid parking only
- Accessible: Yes

Other information
- Website: riderta.com/facilities/airport

History
- Opened: November 15, 1968; 57 years ago
- Rebuilt: 1994
- Original company: Cleveland Transit System

Services
| Preceding station | Rapid Transit | Following station |
|---|---|---|
| Terminus | Red Line | Brookpark toward Windermere |
Location

Airport station is a Rapid station on the RTA Red Line in Cleveland, Ohio. It is the western terminus of the Red Line and is located off the lower level below the middle of the baggage claim level of Cleveland Hopkins International Airport.

== History ==
The station opened on November 15, 1968, when the CTS Rapid Transit was extended four miles from West Park station, making Cleveland the first city in North America to offer direct rapid transit service to its major airport. A $1.9-million renovation of the station was completed in May 1994.

RTA has considered extending the Red Line beyond Hopkins Airport to Berea. Several different plans were considered in the late 1990s. One plan would have extended the Red Line from Hopkins Airport along Ohio State Route 237 past the I-X Center and into downtown Berea. Another plan would have the rapid extend from the Brookpark station past the I-X Center and into Berea. The proposal included the possibility that direct service to the airport terminal would end, with a new station outside the airport grounds which would require riders to be transferred to the terminal by other means. However, the extension failed to obtain approval of the Northeast Ohio Areawide Coordinating Agency because it was too expensive and would not attract enough riders.

RTA continues to consider Red Line extensions to development areas adjacent to the airport, and an extension along the southwest corridor to the I-X Center, Berea or the growing areas of Lorain County is included as part of RTA's long-range plan, Transit 2025. RTA is also working with the City of Cleveland, the State of Ohio, and other passenger rail interests to create an Amtrak station near Hopkins Airport, which would serve as an intermodal airport hub similar to those in Newark, Baltimore, or Milwaukee.

== Gallery ==
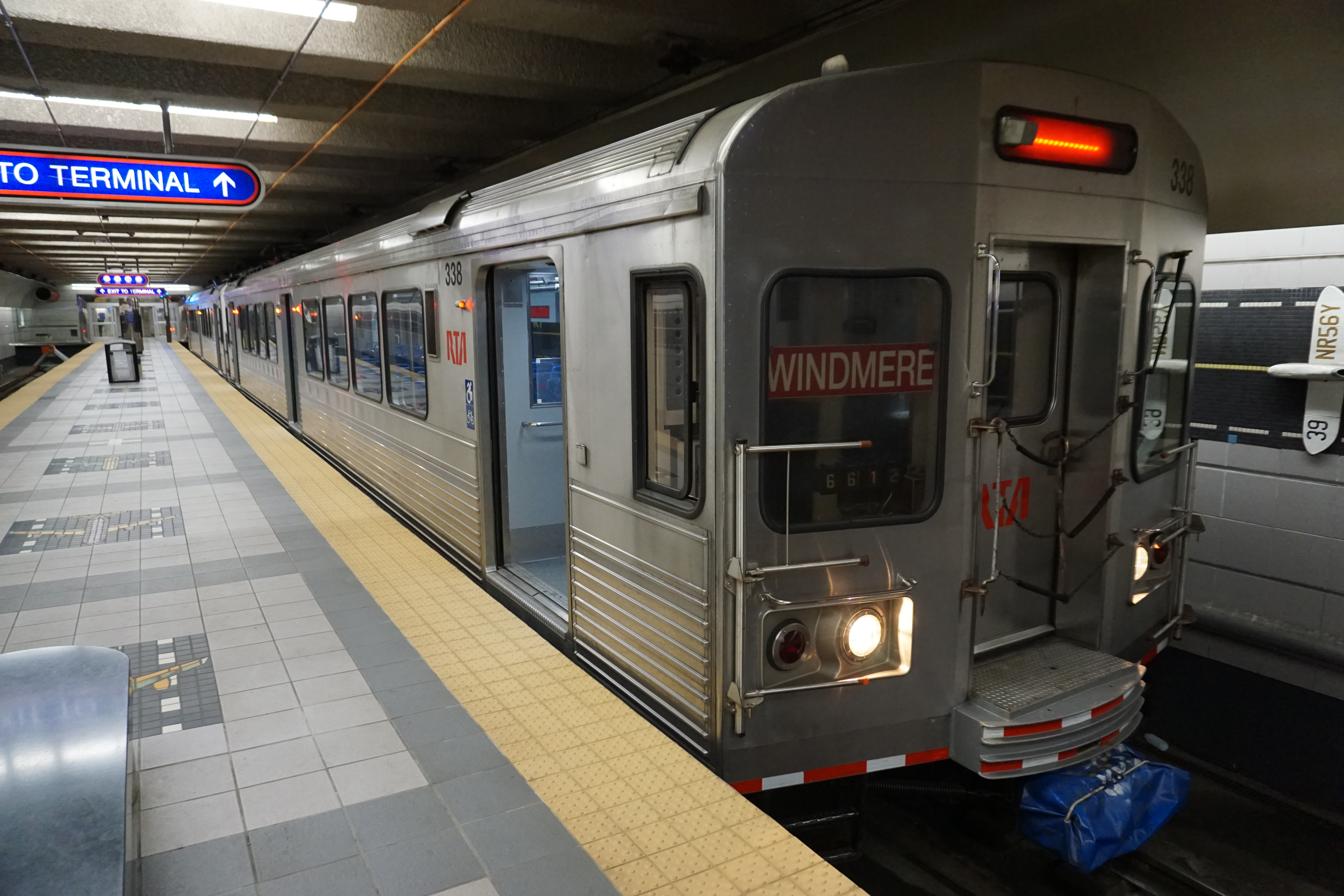
Red Line train at Airport station

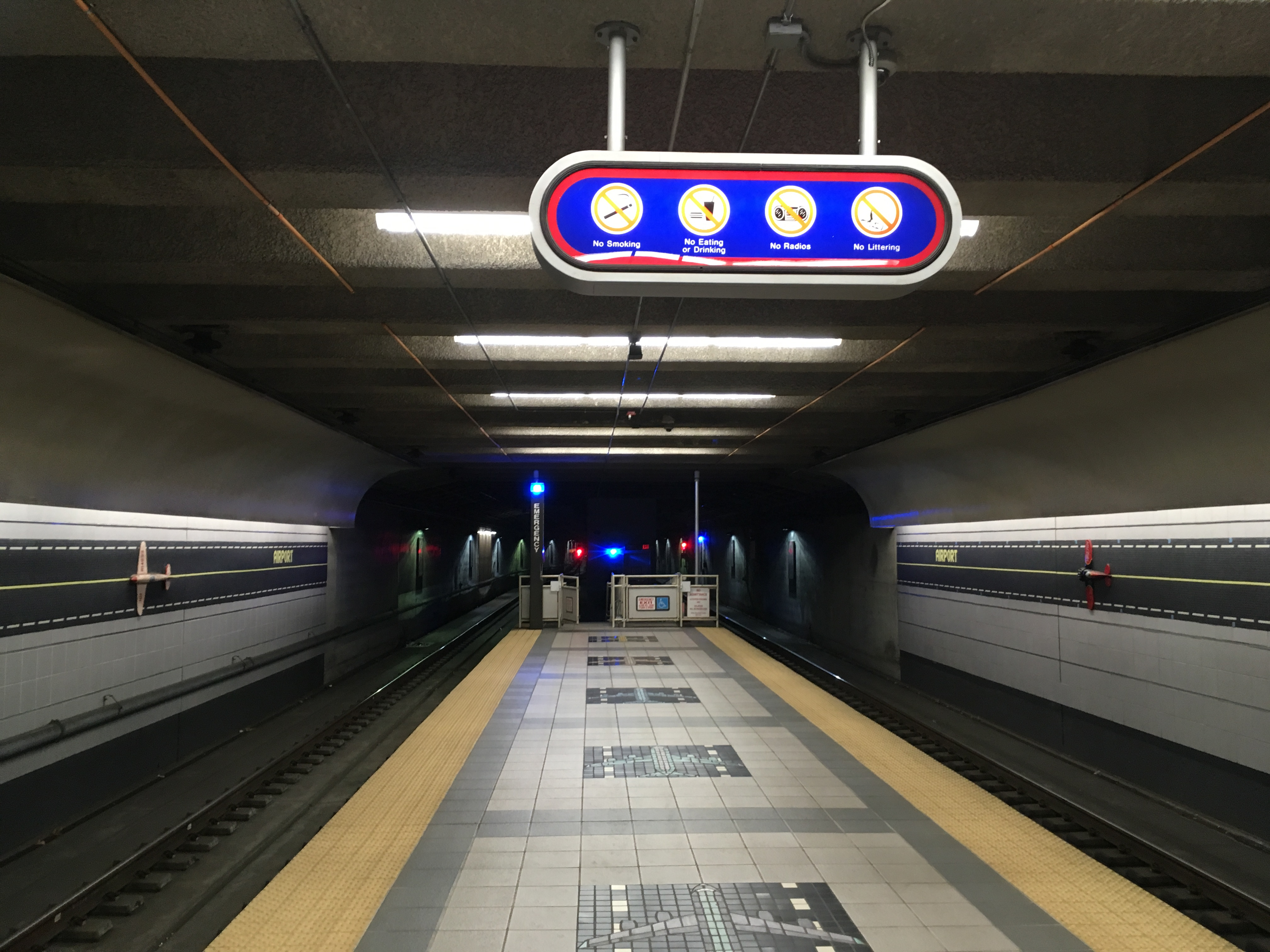
Airport station platform

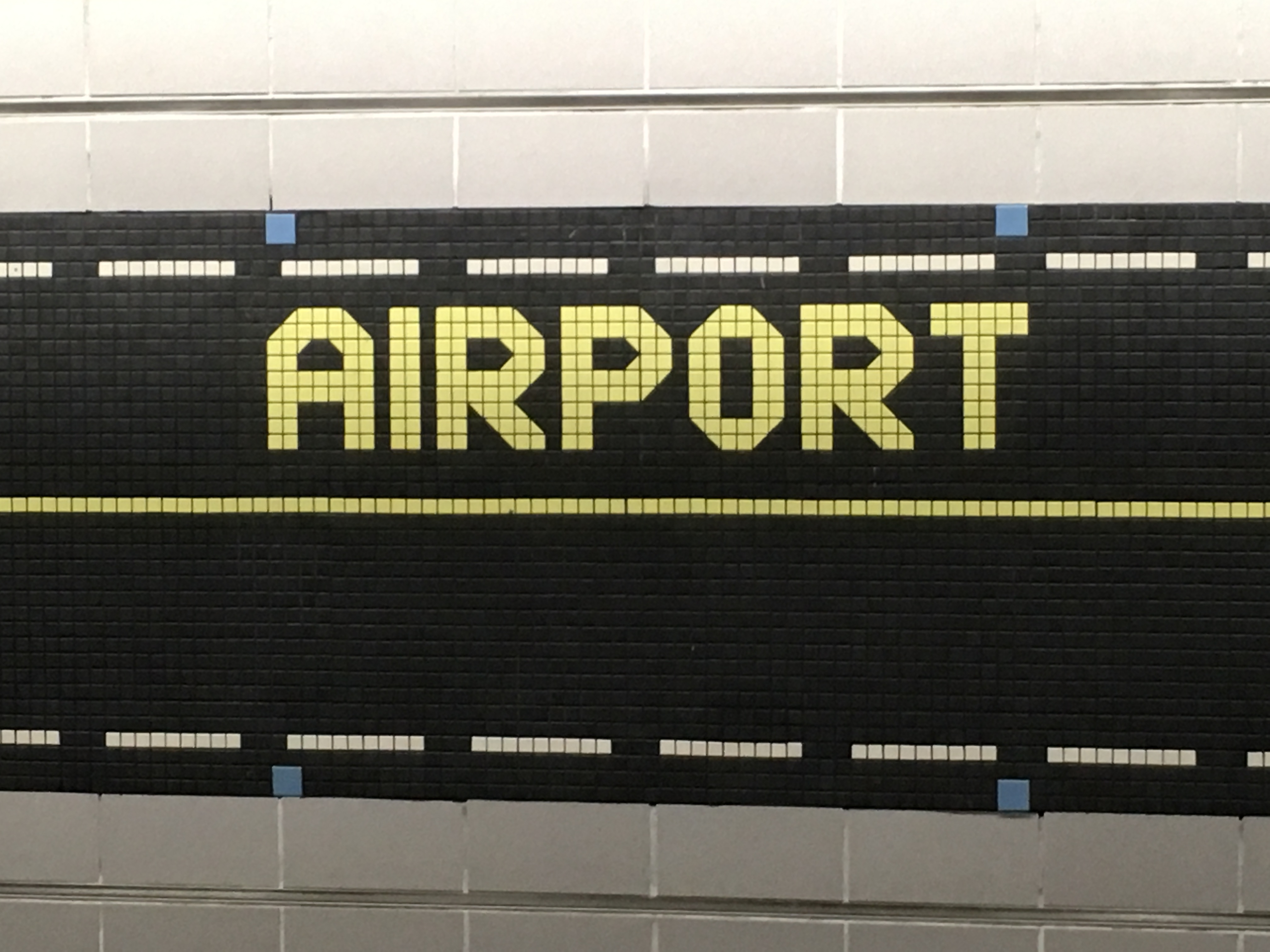
Airport station wall design

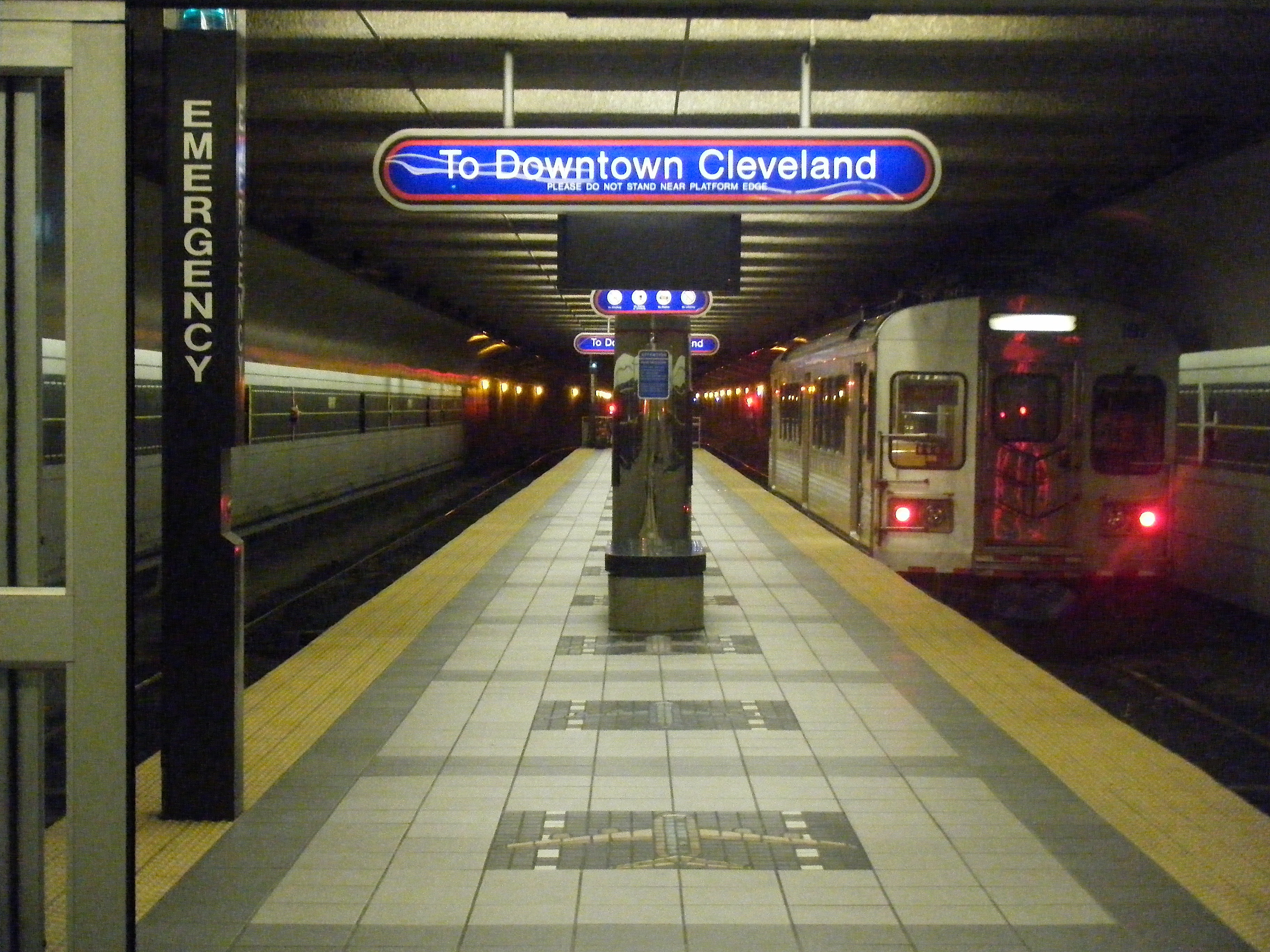
Airport station platform seem from entrance

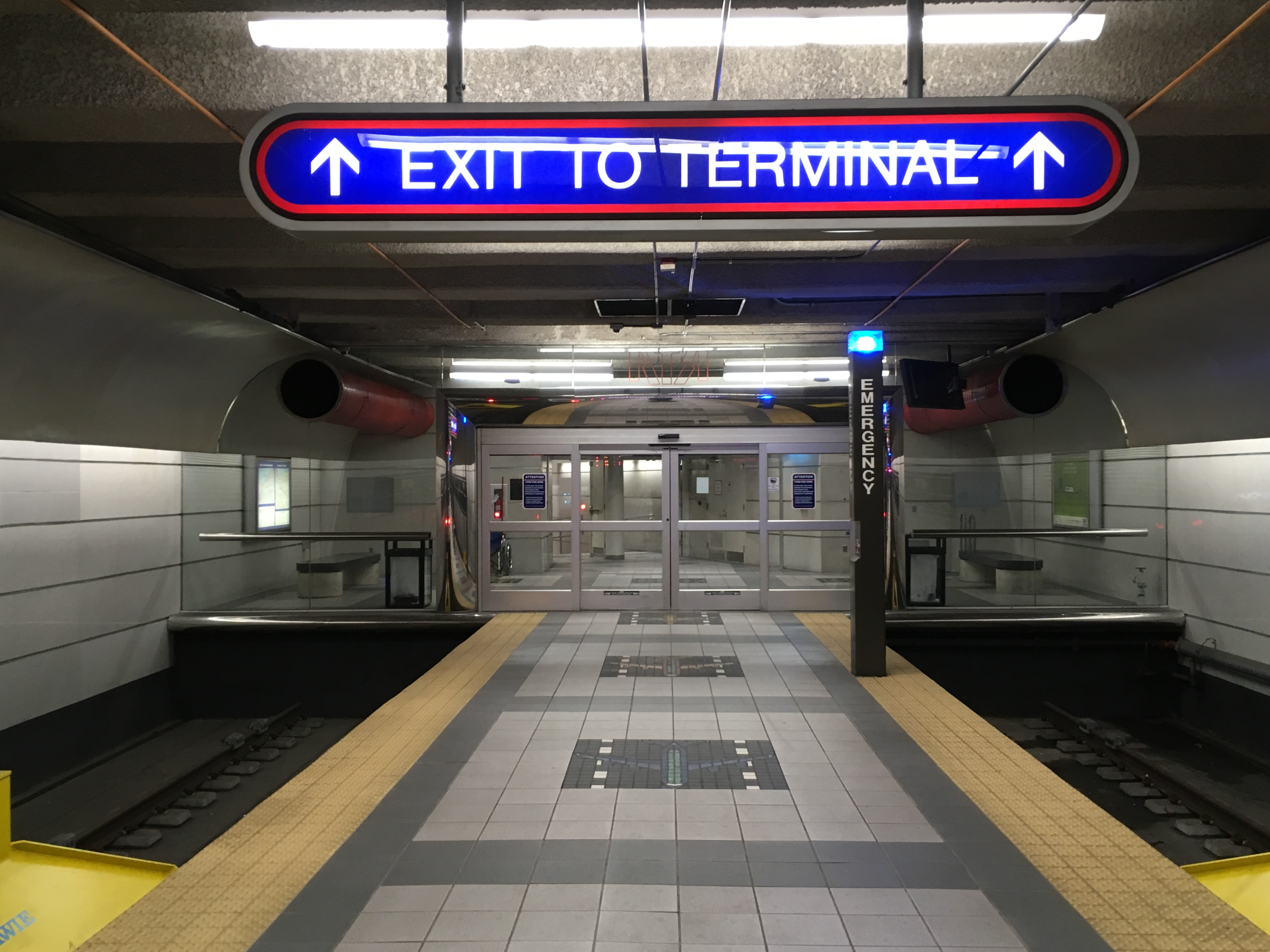
Exit to terminal seen from Airport station platform

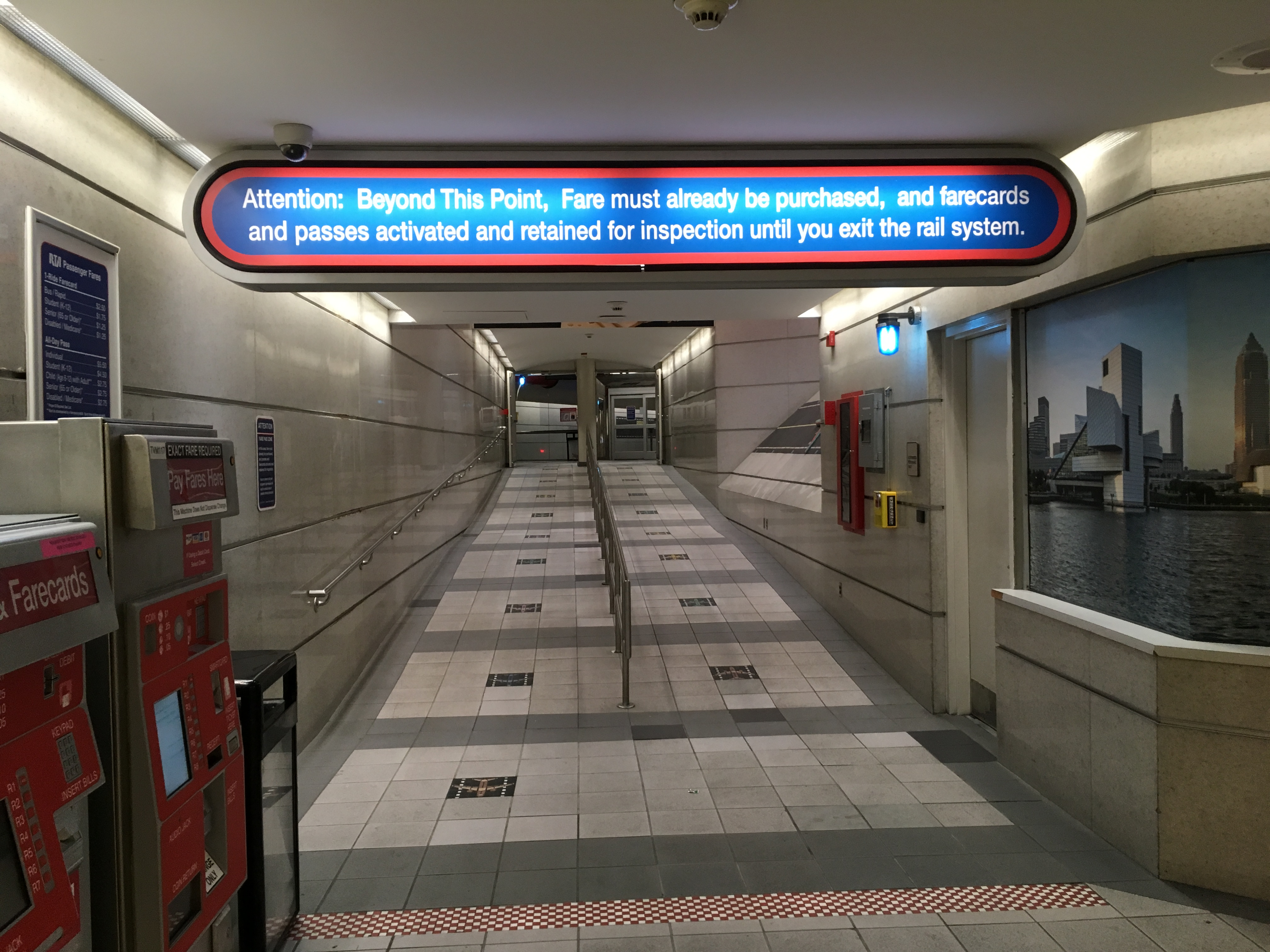
Hallway from ticket machines to platform
