= Louis Stokes Station at Windermere =

Rapid transit station in Cleveland

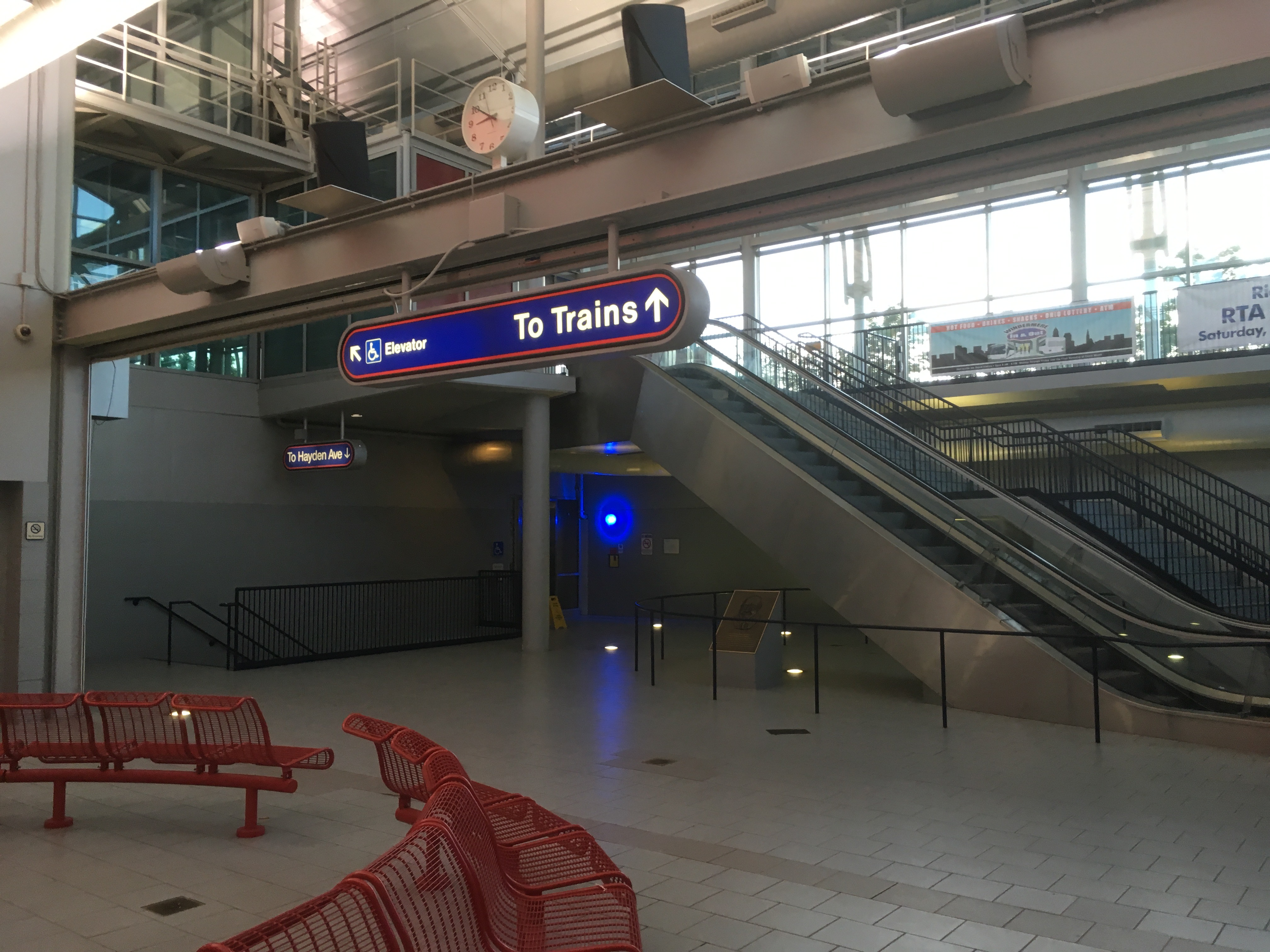
- Lower level of Louis Stokes Station at Windermere

General information
- Location: 14233 Euclid Avenue; East Cleveland, Ohio
- Coordinates: 41°31′50″N 81°35′6″W
- Owner: Greater Cleveland Regional Transit Authority
- Line: NS Lake Erie District
- Platforms: 1 island platform
- Tracks: 2
- Connections: HealthLine; RTA: 3, 7, 7A, 28, 28A, 31, 35, 37, 41, 41F

Construction
- Structure type: Embankment
- Parking: 410 spaces
- Cycle facilities: Racks
- Accessible: Yes

Other information
- Website: riderta.com/facilities/windermere

History
- Opened: March 15, 1955; 71 years ago
- Rebuilt: 1997
- Former names: Windermere
- Original company: Cleveland Transit System

Services
Preceding station	Rapid Transit	Following station
Superior toward Airport	Red Line	Terminus
Location

Louis Stokes Station at Windermere is a rapid transit station on the RTA Red Line in East Cleveland, Ohio. It is located on the northwest side of Euclid Avenue (U.S. Routes 6 and 20) between Bryn Mawr and Doan Roads. It is the eastern terminus of the Red Line and the HealthLine, a bus rapid transit route.

== History ==
Prior to being a rapid transit station, the site was the location of the Windermere Car Barn of the Cleveland Railway and its successor, the Cleveland Transit System (CTS). As streetcars were retired in favor of buses, Windermere also became a bus garage.

On February 4, 1952, CTS broke ground for its rapid transit behind the Windermere Car Barn, on the same embankment as the Nickel Plate railway tracks. The new station, called simply "Windermere Station," opened with the CTS Rapid Transit on March 15, 1955.

As originally constructed, the station included on the embankment level a car yard and car shops for rapid transit and a loop to allow trains to turn around if needed (although the car sets all had operator cabs are both ends). On the south side below the tracks, there was a fare collection headhouse, three bus loading loops and a small free parking lot off Euclid Avenue, along with an elevated walkway over the bus loops to the Euclid Avenue parking lot. A pedestrian tunnel beneath the embankment carrying rapid transit and railway tracks connected the station to a larger free parking lot on the northwest side of the tracks. The entrance to the northwest parking lot was from Hayden Avenue. The Hayden bus garage was also built adjacent to the northwest lot to replace the Windermere Car Barn.

The Windermere car shops were abandoned when RTA opened its new $23-million Central Rail Maintenance Facility opened on April 29, 1984, on a 20-acre (8.1 ha) site at East 55th Street. The Hayden parking lot also closed as the additional parking was not needed and most passengers perceived use of the tunnel as a security risk.

The original station was demolished, and an entirely new station was constructed as part of RTA's program of station reconstruction beginning in the late 1990s. The new $12.7-million station opened on June 22, 1997. The turnaround loop and the car shops were eliminated. In November 1997, RTA renamed the station “Louis Stokes Station at Windermere” in honor of the Congressman Louis Stokes “for his many years of unwavering support.” In 1998, RTA completed a $21-million renovation of the Hayden bus garage.

The property directly southwest of the Euclid Avenue parking area has been used for the construction of a Head Start Center, which was dedicated November 22, 2002. It was the first Head Start Center in Greater Cleveland built next to a rapid transit station, making the facility accessible for many of the families eligible for Head Start who do not have cars.

== Nearby places ==
- East Cleveland
- Nela Park
