= 79th Corps =

79th Corps or LXXIX Corps may refer to:

- 79th Rifle Corps, Soviet Union
- 79th (Glasgow 3rd Western) Lanarkshire Rifle Volunteer Corps, United Kingdom
- 79th (Liverpool) Lancashire Rifle Volunteer Corps, United Kingdom

== See also ==
- List of military corps by number
- 79th Brigade (disambiguation)
- 79th Division (disambiguation)
- 79th Regiment (disambiguation)
- 79th (disambiguation)
