= 79th =

79th is the ordinal form of the number 79. 79th or Seventy-ninth may also refer to:

- A fraction, 1/79, equal to one of 79 equal parts

== Geography ==
- 79th meridian east, a line of longitude
- 79th meridian west, a line of longitude
- 79th parallel north, a circle of latitude
- 79th parallel south, a circle of latitude
- 79th Street (disambiguation)

== Military ==
- 79th Group Army, People's Republic of China
- 79th Brigade (disambiguation)
- 79th Division (disambiguation)
- 79th Regiment (disambiguation)
- 79th Squadron (disambiguation)

== Other ==
- 79th century
- 79th century BC

== See also ==
- 79 (disambiguation)
