= Fairfax, Cleveland =

Neighborhood of Cleveland, Ohio, United States

Fairfax
- Neighborhood of Cleveland
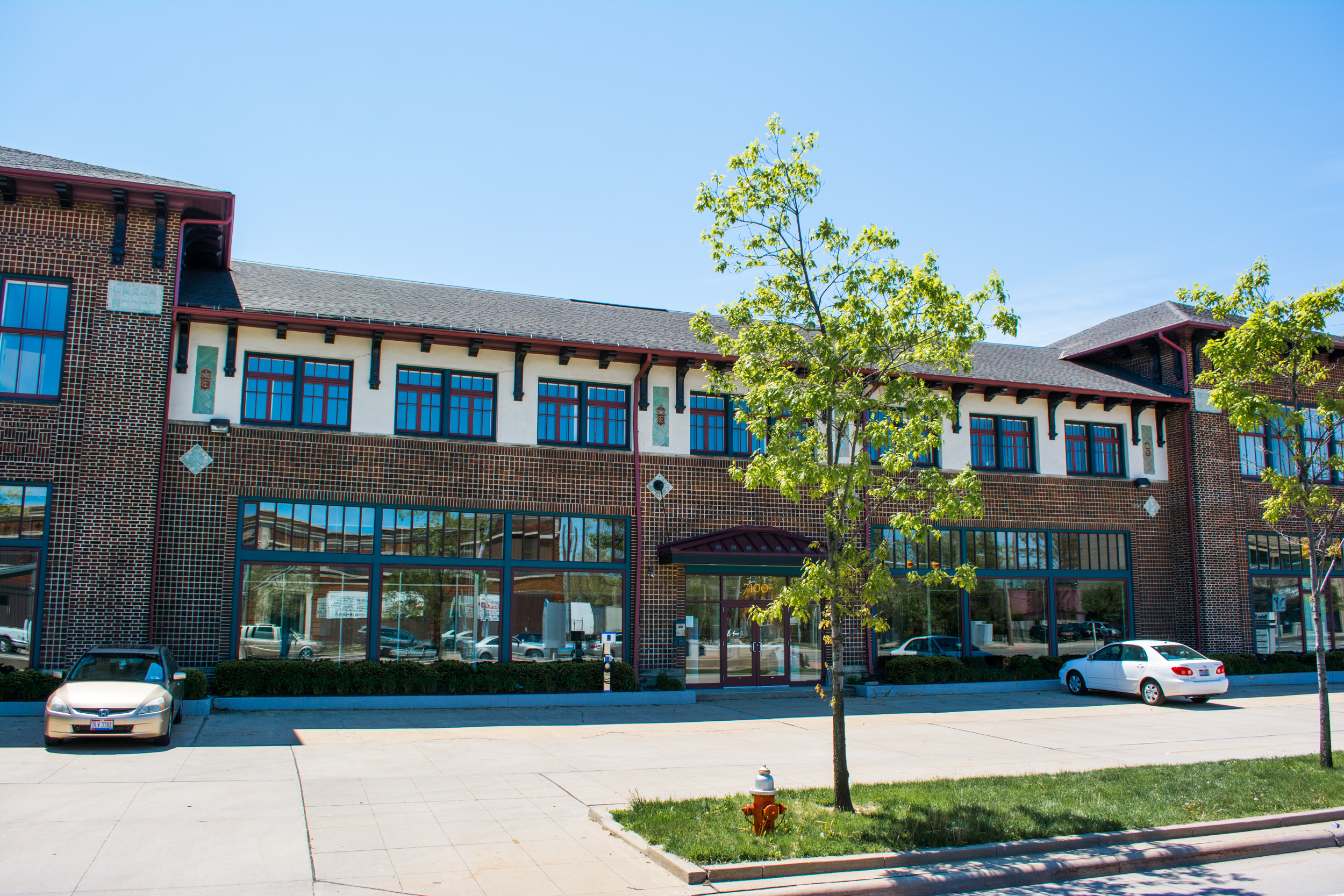

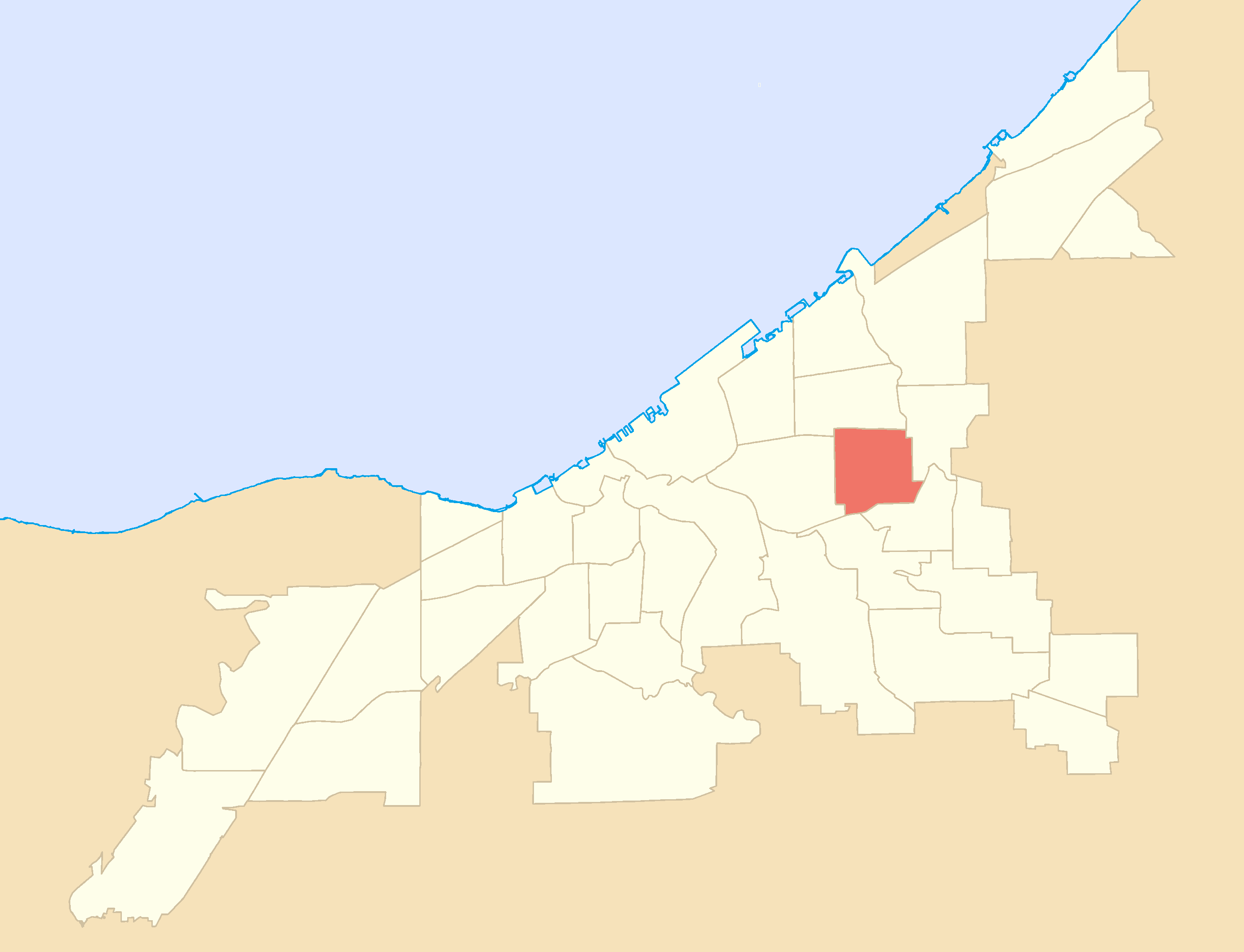
- Coordinates: 41°29′2″N 81°35′26″W
- Country: United States
- State: Ohio
- County: Cuyahoga County
- City: Cleveland

Population (2020)
  - Total: 5,061

Demographics
  - White: 4.4%
  - Black: 92.0%
  - Hispanic (of any race): 0.6%
  - Asian and Pacific Islander: 1.5%
  - Mixed and Other: 2.1%
- Time zone: UTC-5 (EST)
  - Summer (DST): UTC-4 (EDT)
- ZIP Codes: 44106, 44104
- Area code: 216
- Median income: $20,331
- Source: 2020 U.S. Census, City Planning Commission of Cleveland

Fairfax is a neighborhood on the East Side of Cleveland, Ohio. It is roughly bounded between Euclid Avenue to the north, Woodland Avenue to the south, E. 71st Street to the west and E. 105th Street to the east. Fairfax is located on the edge of University Circle, an area containing Cleveland's major educational institutions and museums. The Karamu House is on the National Register of Historic places and is the nation's oldest African-American theater. The northeastern quadrant of Fairfax, along Euclid Avenue to 105th Street, is dominated by the Cleveland Clinic.

== Transportation ==
Fairfax has two main RTA lines running through the neighborhood.

The BRT HealthLine runs down Euclid Avenue.

The Red Line stops at the East 105th–Quincy station.

== Notable people ==
- Dorothy Dandridge
- Vivian Dandridge
- Langston Hughes: playwright, poet, writer - lived in the neighborhood from 1916 to 1922 at 2266 East 86th Street.
- Jesse Owens
- Womack brothers: Bobby, Cecil, Curtis, Friendly Jr. and Harry, members of the musical group, The Valentinos

== Points of interest ==
- Cleveland Clinic (9500 Euclid Avenue), major U.S. hospital
- Karamu House (E. 89th and Quincy Ave), oldest African-American theater in the United States.
- Baker Motor Vehicle Company Building (7100 Euclid Avenue), historic commercial building
- Cuyahoga County Juvenile Justice Center (E. 93rd Street and Quincy Avenue)
