= Frank B. Meade =

American architect (1867–1947)

Frank B. Meade (January 6, 1867 – March 1947) was an American architect.

== Biography ==
Meade was born in Norwalk, Ohio. He attended public schools in Cleveland and graduated from Central High School, Wesleyan College, Case School of Applied Science, and Boston Tech (before it became M.I.T.). He worked in Chicago before returning to Cleveland in 1893. He worked at various firms including in partnerships with classmate Alfred Hoyt Granger and with Abram Garfield, the son of U.S. president James Garfield. He also worked with James Montgomery Hamilton. His work includes many fine homes. He served on the Cleveland Group Plan Commission. He was a founder of the Hermit Club and designed its 1904 and 1928 headquarters buildings.

== Work ==
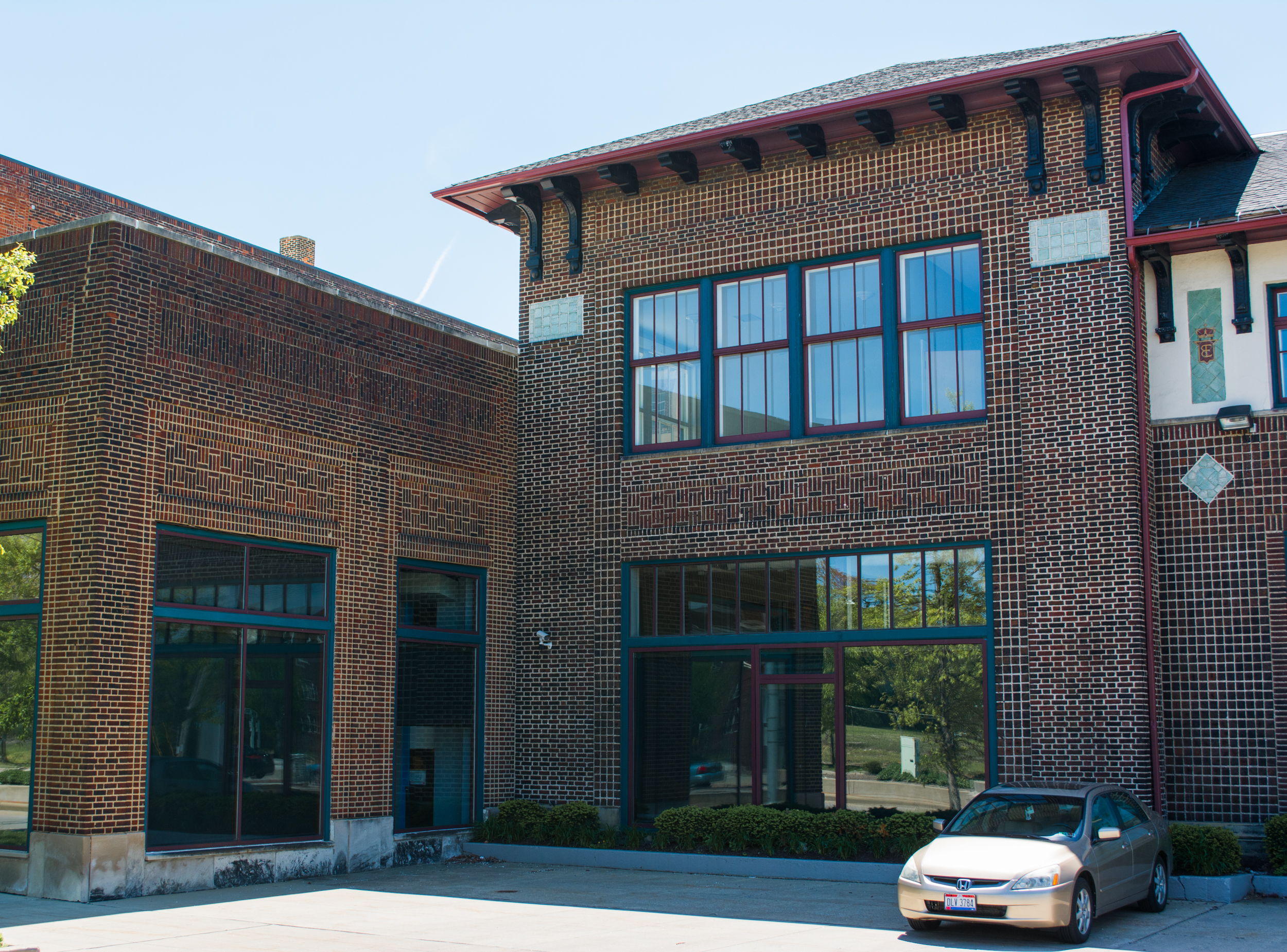
Baker Electric Motor Vehicle Building

- Henry Clay Corson (1895) residence at 578 East Market Street in Akron, Ohio (demolished)
- Mrs. Cline Residence (1895) 61 West Main Street in Norwalk, Ohio
- George Ira Vail residence 1906) at 2197 Harcourt Drive in Cleveland Heights (part of Ambler Heights Historic District)
- Oakwood Club (1906) at 1516 Warrensville Center in Cleveland Heights
- Albert E. Cummer Residence (1907) at 1621 Magnolia in Cleveland Heights (demolished)
- Anthony J. Diebolt Residence (1907) at 2656 East Overlook in Cleveland Heights
- Drury house
- Mayfield Country Club original clubhouse (1911)
- Tudor Arms Hotel (1929)
