= East 79th =

East 79th may refer to:

- East 79th (RTA Blue and Green Line Rapid Transit station)
- East 79th (RTA Red Line Rapid Transit station)
