= Cedar–University station =

Rapid transit station in Cleveland

Cedar–University
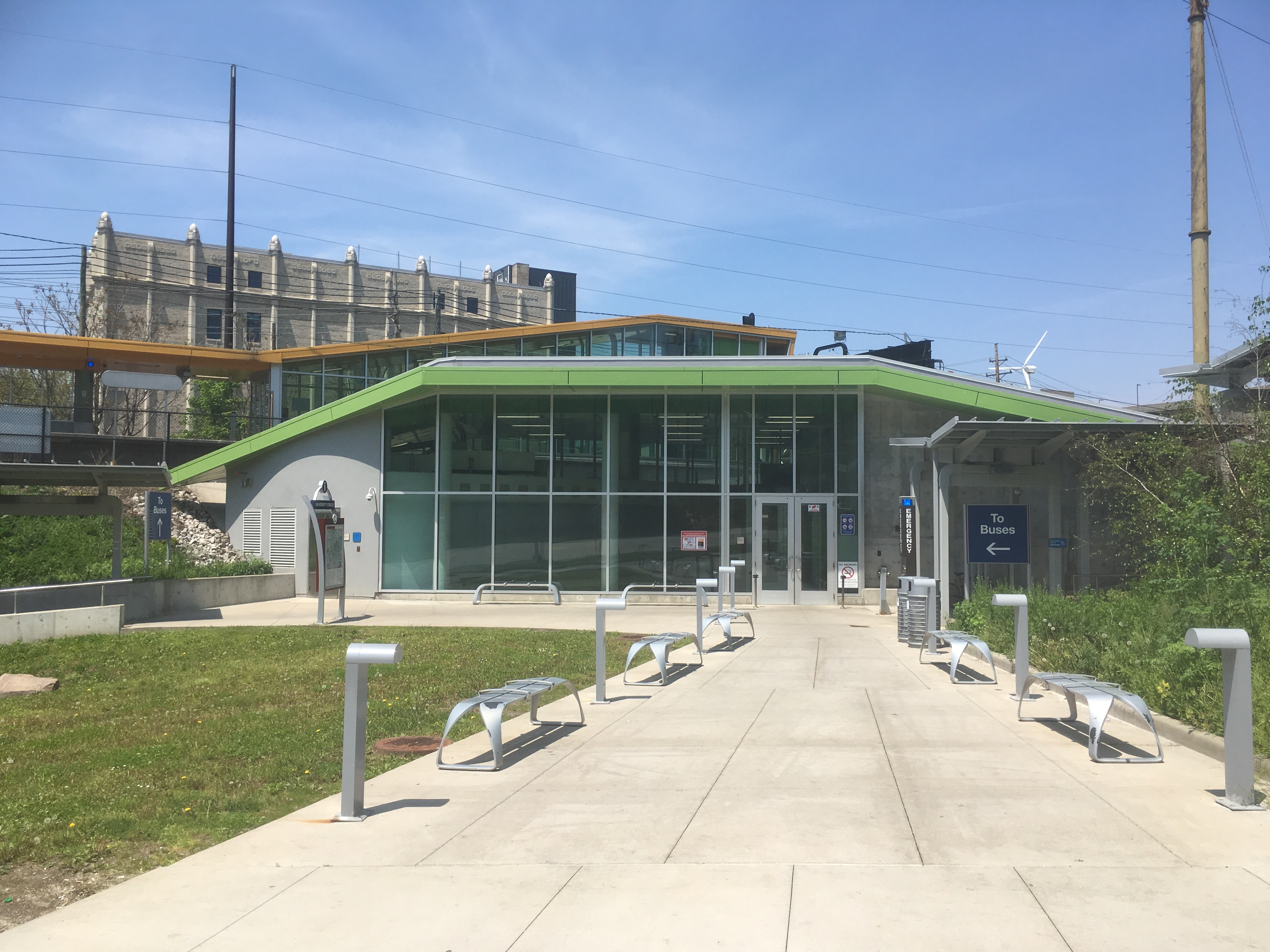
- Cedar–University station entrance

General information
- Location: 11100 Cedar Glen Parkway; Cleveland, Ohio
- Coordinates: 41°30′0″N 81°36′19″W
- Owner: Greater Cleveland Regional Transit Authority
- Lines: NS Lake Erie District; CSX Cleveland Short Line Subdivision
- Platforms: 1 island platform
- Tracks: 2
- Connections: RTA: 11, 48, 50; CircleLink: GreenLink

Construction
- Structure type: Embankment
- Cycle facilities: Racks
- Accessible: Yes

Other information
- Website: riderta.com/facilities/cedaruniversity

History
- Opened: March 15, 1955; 71 years ago
- Rebuilt: August 28, 2014
- Former names: University Circle
- Original company: Cleveland Transit System

Services
Preceding station	Rapid Transit	Following station
East 105th–Quincy toward Airport	Red Line	Little Italy–University Circle toward Windermere
Former services
Preceding station	Rapid Transit	Following station
East 105th–Quincy toward Airport	Red Line	Euclid–East 120th (Closed 2015) toward Windermere
Location

Cedar–University station is a station on the RTA Red Line in Cleveland, Ohio. The station is located in University Circle at the foot of Cedar Hill along Cedar Glen Parkway (which connects Cleveland's Cedar Avenue with Cleveland Heights's Cedar Road).

The station also connects with CircleLink shuttle buses operated by Case Western Reserve University. The CircleLink buses stop at the corner of East 114th Street and Glenwood Avenue at the northern entrance to the station.

== History ==
The station opened along with the rest of the CTS Rapid Transit on March 15, 1955 and was originally named "University Circle". As originally constructed, the station had entrances and bus loading lanes on both sides of Cedar east of the rail tracks. In addition, there was a bus loop with loading area southwest of the station at the corner of Cedar Avenue and Martin Luther King Jr. Drive.

In October 2010, federal funds were secured for a complete reconstruction of the station and to bring it into full accessible compliance. Ground was broken on September 19, 2012, and the new station opened on August 28, 2014. Upon its reopening, the station was given the new name of Cedar–University. The new facility reconstructed the rail station in the same general location, but the entrance on the south side of Cedar was closed and removed and the south bus loading lane was also eliminated. The bus loop transfer zone was rebuilt and moved to the northeast corner of the intersection of Cedar Avenue and Martin Luther King Jr. Drive.

== Notable places nearby ==
- University Circle
- Case School of Engineering
- Little Italy
- Cedar Glen Apartments
- Cleveland FES Center
- Alcazar Hotel
- First Church of Christ, Scientist
- John Hay High School
- Case Western Reserve University
- Case Comprehensive Cancer Center
