= 79th Street station =

79th Street station can refer to:

== Chicago ==
- 79th station, served by the CTA Red Line
- 79th Street/Chatham station, served by the Metra Electric District
- 79th Street/Cheltenham station, served by the Metra Electric District South Chicago Branch

== Cleveland ==
- East 79th station (GCRTA Blue and Green Lines)
- East 79th station (GCRTA Red Line)

== New York City ==
- 79th Street station (IRT Broadway–Seventh Avenue Line) in Manhattan, served by the 1 and 2 trains
- 79th Street station (BMT West End Line) in Brooklyn, served by the D train

== See also ==
- 79th Street (disambiguation)
