= Tudor Arms Hotel =

Historic hotel in Cleveland, Ohio

- Cleveland Club
- U.S. National Register of Historic Places
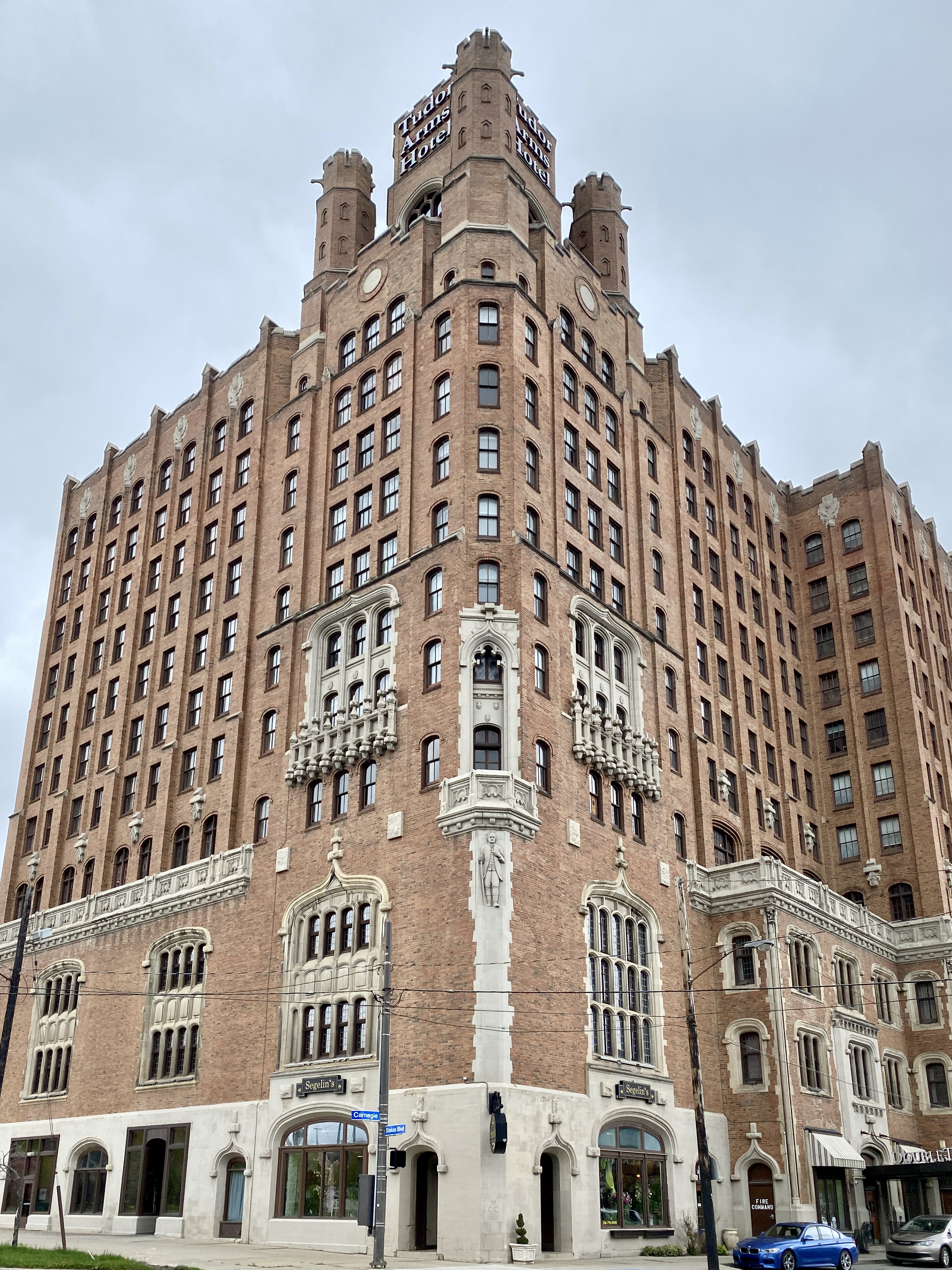

- Location within Ohio
- Location: 10660 Carnegie Ave., Cleveland, Ohio
- Coordinates: 41°30′02″N 81°36′47″W
- Area: less than one acre
- Built: 1930
- Architect: Frank B. Meade
- Architectural style: Tudor Revival
- NRHP reference No.: 08000113
- Added to NRHP: February 28, 2008

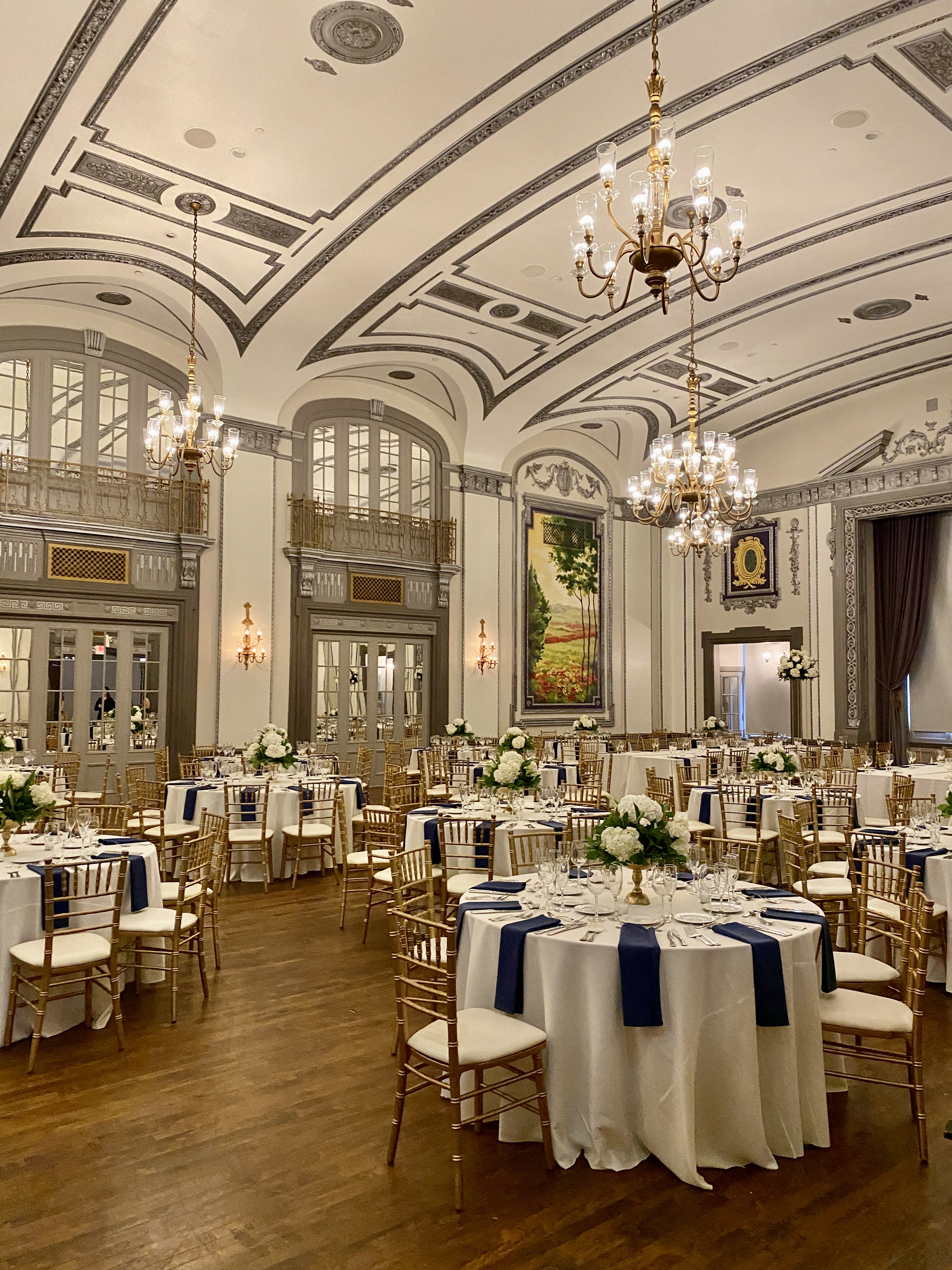

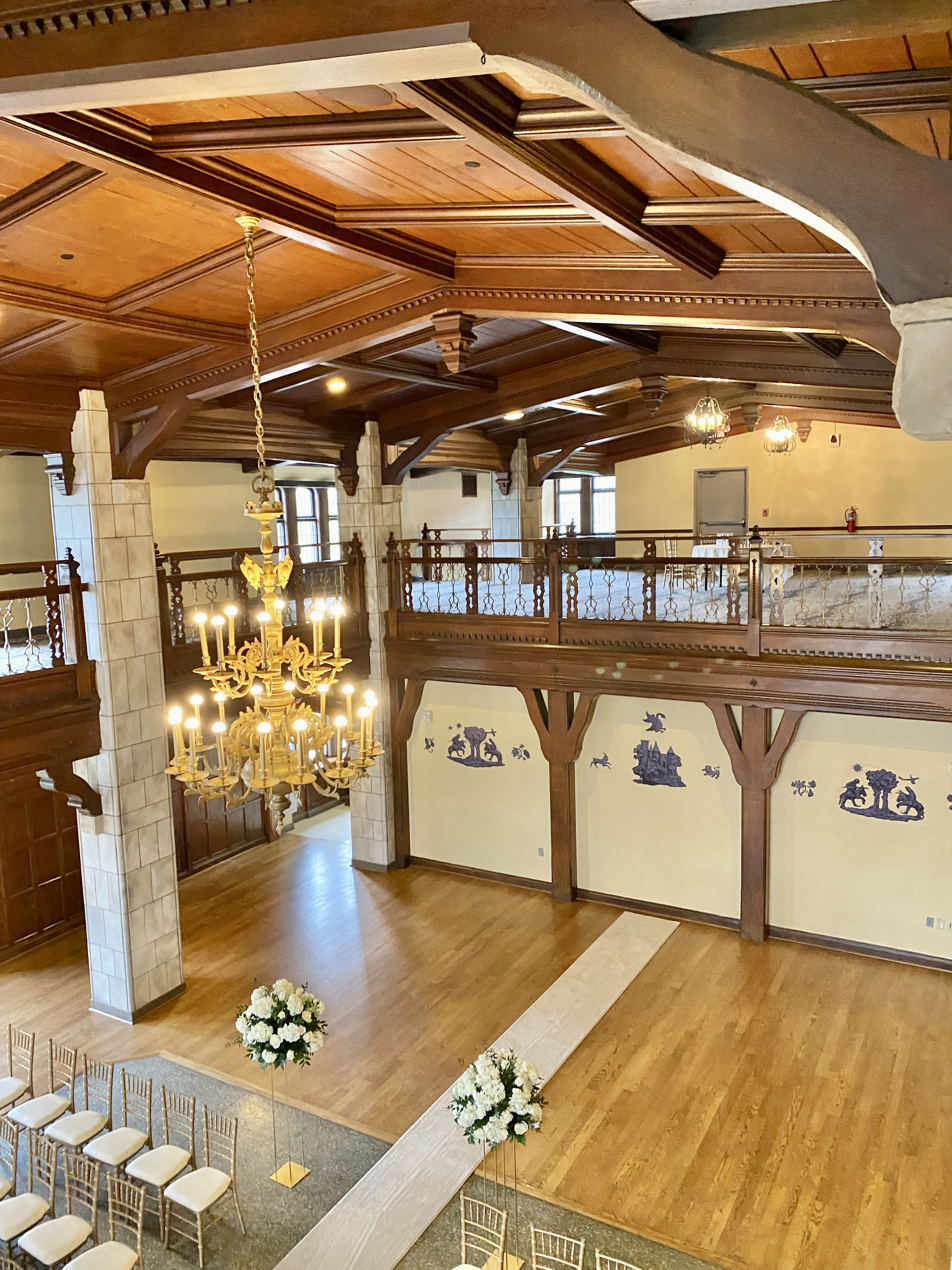

The Tudor Arms Hotel is a historic hotel in the University Circle neighborhood of Cleveland, Ohio. It was designed by Cleveland architect Frank B. Meade in 1929 and opened in 1933 as the Cleveland Club. The 12-story Gothic revival building sits at the corner of Carnegie Avenue and Stokes Boulevard.

It had a swimming pool, bowling alley, library, and two ballrooms. Mobster Al Capone was a regular. The club closed in 1939 during the Great Depression and the building reopened as the Tudor Arms Hotel. One of the ballrooms became the Empress Room supper club where performers including Patrice Wymore, Duke Ellington, and Louis Armstrong showed up.

In the 1950s the building was a residence for Case Western Reserve graduate students. From 1971 to 2007, it housed the Cleveland Job Corps Center. Cleveland developers MRN Ltd purchased the property in 2007, and in 2011 began a $22 million renovation of the building.

The building includes brick and limestone. It was added to the National Register of Historic Places in 1994 and the Historic Hotels of America in 2015.

== See also ==
- List of gentlemen's clubs in the United States
- Drury Mansion, former home of the Drury Club in Cleveland
