= 79th Street =

79th Street may refer to:

== In New York ==
- 79th Street (Manhattan)
- Stations of the New York City Subway:
  - 79th Street station (BMT West End Line), in Brooklyn; serving the D train
  - 79th Street station (IRT Broadway–Seventh Avenue Line), in Manhattan; serving the 1 and 2 trains

== In Chicago ==
- 79th station, a CTA Red Line station
- 79th Street/Chatham station, a Metra Electric station on the main line
- 79th Street/Cheltenham station, a Metra Electric station on the South Chicago branch

== In Cleveland ==
- East 79th station (GCRTA Red Line)
- East 79th station (GCRTA Blue and Green Lines)

== See also ==
- 79th Street station (disambiguation)
