= 79 =

79 may refer to:

- 79 (number), the natural number following 78 and preceding 80
- one of the years 79 BC, AD 79, 1979, 2079
  - Eruption of Mount Vesuvius in 79, a catastrophic volcanic eruption in Italy
    - 79 A.D., a 1962 historical epic film about the eruption
- Dimension 79⊢⊇V, the main antagonist of Rick and Morty from a parallel Earth.
- 79 Eurynome, a main-belt asteroid
- Seventy-Nine (film), 2013 American film

== See also ==
- 79th (disambiguation)
- List of highways numbered 79
