= Drury Mansion =

Mansion in Ohio, United States

Coordinates: 41.5039°N 81.6266°W

The Drury Mansion in Cleveland, Ohio was built in 1912. Originally a residence, it later became home to the Drury Club, a social club from 1939 to 1947. The 34 room 25,000 square foot mansion at 8615 Euclid Avenue was built for Francis Edison Drury (1850-1932), an industrial innovator and foundry owner. In 1925 he relocated to Cedar Hill Farm in Gates Mills, Ohio. That new home, a larger version of the Drury Mansion, is now part of Gilmour Academy. The original Drury Mansion became Crittenton Home, housing unwed mothers. It then served as a Reintegration Clinic until 1989 when the Cleveland Clinic acquired it for use as an event space and conference center.

Meade & Hamilton was the architectural firm that designed it. Drury purchased the estate across the street and made it a formal garden with reflecting pools, pond, pagoda, and greenhouse. The Cleveland Play House was built on the site after it was donated by Drury.

Drury was a Dartmouth graduate. Drury manufactured internal gear lawnmowers and kerosene stoves. He also established Cleveland Foundry Co. Drury had a son Herbert Remington Drury Sr. who became a geographer and educator.

== See also ==
- Cleveland Club
