= Cedar Glen Apartments =

- U.S. National Register of Historic Places
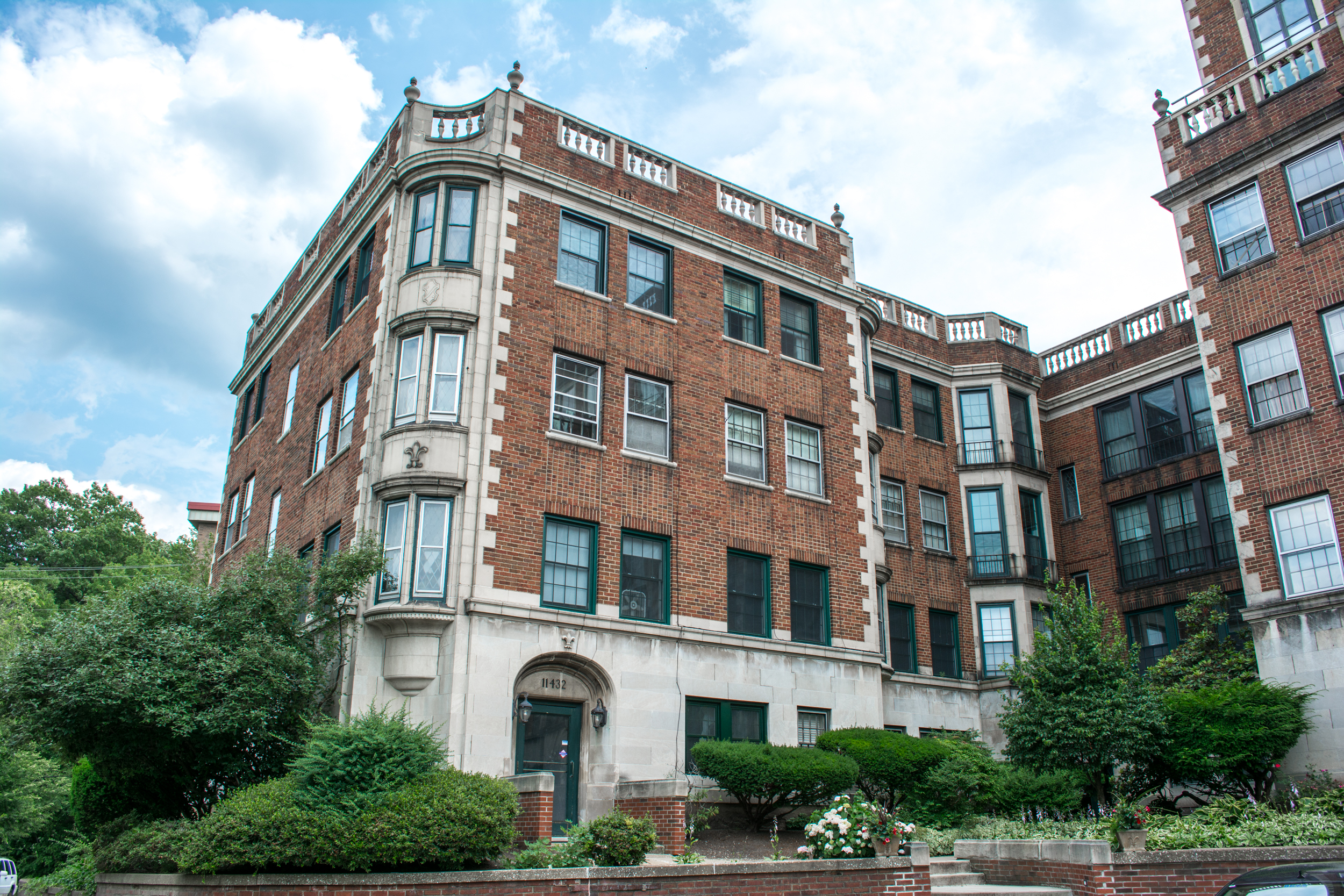
- 11432 Cedar Glen Parkway, the easternmost building in the Cedar Glen complex

- Location within Cleveland Location within Ohio Location within the United States
- Location: 11424-11432 Cedar Glen Parkway, Cleveland, Ohio, U.S.
- Coordinates: 41°29′57″N 81°36′15″W
- Built: 1927
- Architect: Samuel H. Weis
- Architectural style: Georgian Revival architecture
- NRHP reference No.: 94000594
- Added to NRHP: June 17, 1994

The Cedar Glen Apartments is a historic apartment building located in the University Circle neighborhood of Cleveland, Ohio, in the United States. Designed by prominent local architect Samuel H. Weis and completed in 1927, the building originally contained luxury apartments and served as a gateway to the more exclusive neighborhood of Cleveland Heights, on whose border the building is located. Threatened with demolition in 1992, the building was purchased by new owners and converted into condominiums.

The structure was added to the National Register of Historic Places on June 17, 1994.

== Development of Cedar Glen ==
=== Geography of Cedar Glen and the Quarry Railroad ===
The city of Cleveland lies on the shore of Lake Erie on the Erie Plain. Just a few miles inland is the Portage Escarpment, which separates the Erie Plain from the Appalachian Plateau. The Portage Escarpment also defines the political geography of Cleveland and its eastern suburbs, and acts as both the legal and natural boundary between Cleveland and the city of Cleveland Heights, Ohio. In part, two ravines provided natural access to the heights atop the escarpment. One was the Doan Brook ravine, which today is encompassed by Ambler Park. The other was Cedar Brook ravine, more commonly referred to as Cedar Glen. Cedar Brook emptied into Doan Brook at the base of the hill. Nearby, a natural mineral spring known as Blue Rock Springs bubbled up from the ground.

From the beginning of white settlement of the area until about 1890, the area atop the escarpment (which would later become East Cleveland Township in 1847 and Cleveland Heights in 1901) was only very sparsely settled. Scattered on the edge of the escarpment were dairies, farms, orchards, and vineyards. For much of this period, only a narrow, ill-repaired dirt road ran through Cedar Glen. Beginning in the early 1800s, several Euclid bluestone quarries operated atop the escarpment. In 1834, a narrow-gauge railway, the Quarry Railroad, was built from Public Square to E. 101st Street along Chester Avenue, and then along what is now Martin Luther King, Jr. Avenue to Cedar Glen Parkway and up Cedar Hill to the quarries above. The railroad failed in 1849.

=== Early developments atop Cedar Glen ===
In 1869, a group of Cleveland businessmen pooled their resources to create the 285-acre (1,150,000 m^{2}) Lake View Cemetery straddling the Cleveland-Cleveland Heights border about 0.5 miles (0.8 km) northwest of Cedar Glen. In 1873, John D. Rockefeller purchased 103 acres (420,000 m^{2}) of land (bounded by Euclid Avenue, Lee Road, and Superior Avenue) northeast and adjacent to the cemetery. In June 1874, Rockefeller sold 10 acres (40,000 m^{2}) on a hill off Forest Hills Blvd. (now Sled Hill in Forest Hill Park) to Marcus and Mary Montgomery. At a mineral spring atop the hill, the Montgomerys constructed a hotel and advertised the spring as a cure for various illnesses. Rockefeller bought back the property in 1877, and turned the hotel into his summer residence.

In 1880, Dr. Nathan Hardy Ambler and his adopted son and business partner, Daniel O. Caswell, a water cure resort hotel and sanitarium at the foot of Cedar Glen. The Blue Rock Spring House remained open until 1908. The resort proved so popular that in 1884 the Cleveland Railway Company built an electric streetcar line on Cedar Avenue. Known as the Cedar Avenue Line, this streetcar ran from E. 22nd Street to the foot of Cedar Glen.

=== Euclid Heights and streetcar lines ===
In 1890, Patrick Calhoun purchased 300 acres (1,200,000 m^{2}) of wooded land atop Cedar Hill north of Cedar Road. He began development of a planned community for the wealthy and upper classes, calling it Euclid Heights. The same year, brothers Edmund and William Walton began laying out another development, Cedar Heights, along Bellfield and Grandview Avenues on the south side of Cedar Road. Calhoun and his business partner, John Hartness Brown, realized that their development would not be a success unless there was a way other than dirt roads to ascend the heights. Walking the heights, the two concluded that an electric streetcar up Cedar Glen was the best option. In 1896, Calhoun donated all his property from Euclid Avenue to the foot of Cedar Hill, and on both sides of the ravine of Cedar Glen, to the city of Cleveland and to Cleveland Metroparks. In exchange, Calhoun was given the authority to construct a double-track streetcar line up Cedar Glen. That same year, the Cleveland Railway Company extended its Euclid Avenue Line along Stearns Road to Cedar Glen, up the hill to Euclid Heights Blvd., and then along the boulevard to Coventry Road to serve Calhoun's Euclid Heights development. By 1900, the Cedar Avenue Line streetcar had made Euclid Heights a major development.

Work began in 1897 to turn the rutted dirt road ascending Cedar Glen into a wide, modern parkway. Named Cedar Glen Parkway for the ravine through which it ran, the road (several hundred feet wide and 0.5 miles (0.8 km) long) neared completion at the end of 1898.

In 1903, construction began on the Ambler Heights development. Located adjacent to and west of Cedar Heights, the development was named for Dr. Nathan Hardy Ambler (who owned most of the land). Ambler Heights was laid out and promoted by Daniel O. Caswell and Ambler's nephew, William Eglin Ambler, Sales never took off, and the site was replatted in 1900.

In 1906, the Cleveland and Eastern Railway Company gained trackage rights to run its interurban railway through Cedar Glen. The line, which had fully opened in 1899, followed Cedar Glen Parkway to Euclid Heights Blvd. and then to Chardon, Ohio. The following year, the Cleveland Railway Company created a branch line which began at the top of Cedar Glen and ran down Cedar Road and to Fairmount Blvd. to Lee Road.

By 1920, Cedar Glen Parkway was clogged with automobile traffic. In 1925, the Cleveland Railway Company created a third branch line at the top of Cedar Glen, building it along Cedar Road to Coventry Road.

The parkway and extensive streetcar service made Cedar Glen a major gateway between Cleveland and Cleveland Heights.

== Cedar Glen Apartments ==
=== Construction of the building ===
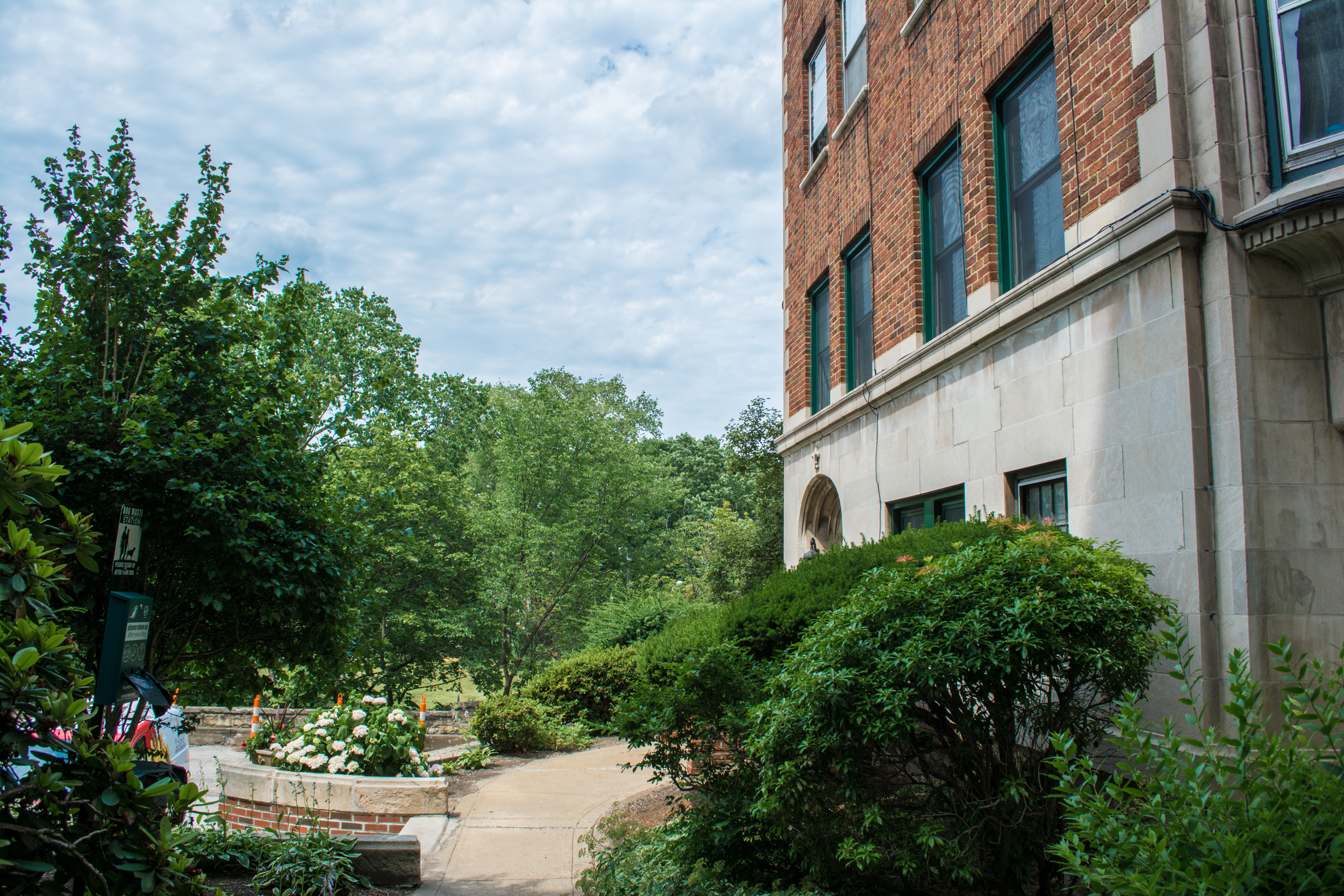
The building once had an unobstructed view of University Circle, but mature trees now block the vista.

Despite the extensive development on the east (Cleveland Heights) side of Ambleside Drive, by 1910 no development had occurred in the area west of it (within the city of Cleveland). The first development here, Ambleside Apartments (now the University Manor skilled nursing facility), began construction in 1913 and was completed in 1914. It was an inexpensive, $50,000 ($1,600,000 in 2025 dollars), four-story, 16-unit apartment building designed by local architect Theodore Conner. (Note: No other structure would be built on Ambleside Drive until 1973, when the Judson Park retirement community began construction on the $5.5 million ($39,900,000 in 2025 dollars), 10-story, 154-unit Jordan-Gardner Tower, located at 2181 Ambleside Drive in Cleveland Heights. It opened in 1975. In 1976, the Cuyahoga Metropolitan Housing Authority began construction on Ambleside Tower, a 14-story, 201-unit apartment tower for low-income and indigent elderly and disabled individuals at 2190 Ambleside. It opened in 1978.)

In 1925, planning began on the Cedar Glen Apartments at 11424-11432 Cedar Glen Parkway. Owned and designed by prominent local architect Samuel E. Weis (a.k.a. Samuel E. White), it was one of the first apartment buildings to be erected in Cleveland in several years. Located just inside the Cleveland city limits at the corner of Ambleside Drive and Cedar Glen Parkway and facing the parkway, the structure was 15 feet (4.6 m) to 25 feet (7.6 m) above the road. With a then-unobstructed view of the Cleveland Museum of Art, Western Reserve University and Case Institute of Technology, Severance Hall, and University Circle, It was only a short distance south of Cleveland's Little Italy. The Plain Dealer newspaper called it one of the "most unusual sites" in the city.

The building had a 335-foot (102 m) frontage on Cedar Glen Parkway, a 200-foot (61 m) frontage on Ambleside Drive. The building's access road was set back 30 feet (9.1 m) from Cedar Glen Parkway, and the structure's east wall 20 feet (6.1 m) from Ambleside. Ample vacant land at the rear of the building provided privacy. The first floor of the Georgian Revival-style building's exterior was clad in Indiana limestone, with the upper floors consisting of exposed brick with limestone trim at the corners and around the doorways. The windows were trimmed with stone. The building frame was steel, with walls, floors, and the roof of reinforced concrete. The cornice was topped by a balustrade consisting of terra cotta balusters and a stone railing. Stone urns rested atop the balustrade. The structure's exterior and interior masonry walls were certified by the Cleveland Clay League as using locally sourced materials, fireproof, and attractive. The E-shaped building had a garden forecourt 75 feet (23 m) deep and 100 feet (30 m) long. The apartment complex itself consisted of a six-story central tower equipped with an elevator, and two four-story walk-up wings (e.g., equipped with stairs but no elevator). Each wing, each connection, and the central tower all had their own entrances. The building had an underground 40-car garage with internal staircases (so patrons did not have to exit the garage to reach the interior of the building).

As originally constructed, the Cedar Glen Apartments had 27 units ranging in size from four to eight rooms, (Note: A 1960 media report said the 27 units had a combined total of 52 rooms. At some point before 1956, the number of units was increased to 32. By 1933, the number of units had fallen to 30.) some with servants' quarters. Intended as a luxury apartment, all the rooms were unusually large. Each bedroom had its own bathroom, and featured large windows. Each apartment had a fireplace of molded concrete, numerous closets, and enclosed radiators, and came equipped with the latest electronic work-saving appliances (such as a frost free refrigerator, dishwasher, and stove exhaust hood). The central tower was topped with a 4,000-square-foot (370 m^{2}), two-story, 12-room, six-bath penthouse. Each room in the penthouse had 20-foot (6.1 m) ceilings. The upper floor of the penthouse consisted of two bedrooms and a bathroom.

The final cost of the Cedar Glen Apartments was $650,000 ($12,000,000 in 2025 dollars), slightly higher than its projected cost of $600,000 ($10,900,000 in 2025 dollars), and the building was completed in July 1927.

=== History of the building ===
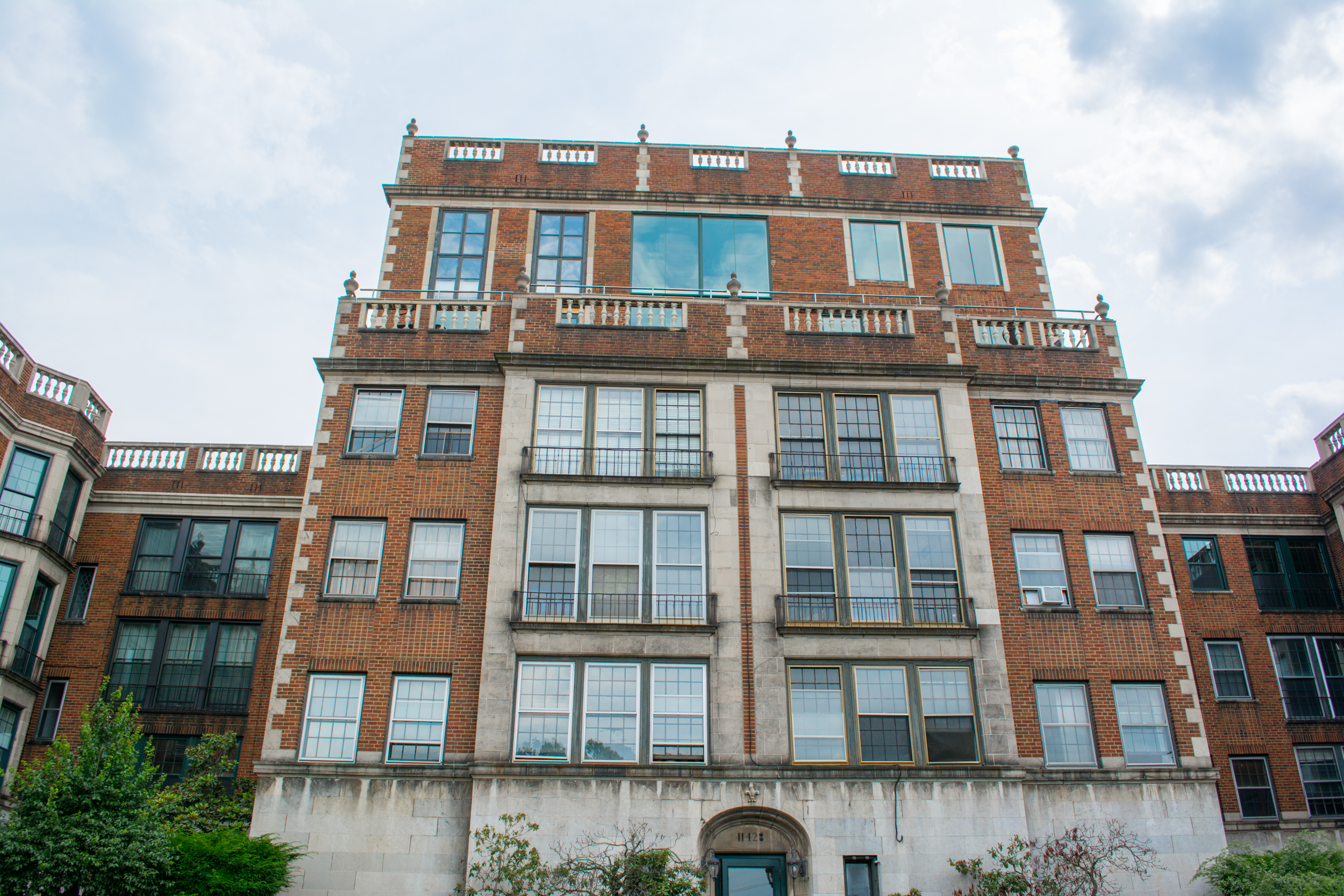
11428 Cedar Glen Parkway. Note the two-story penthouse atop the structure.

A wide range of wealthy and upper-middle class attorneys, businesspeople, civic leaders, educators, elected officials, government officials, physicians, and others took up residence in the Cedar Glen Apartments after they opened, making it one of Cleveland's most sought-after addresses. Residents included Feargus B. Squire, former secretary of Standard Oil, who leased the penthouse in 1928. It was widely considered a Cleveland landmark due to its location, the notability of its residents, its very spacious apartments, and its architectural design. The Cedar Glen Apartments epitomized apartment living and design for the period 1910 to 1930. Just over 50 percent of all Americans lived in apartments in the 1920s, and apartments were seen as equivalent to homes: Spacious, comfortable, and with numerous amenities. Wealthy Americans expected even more from their apartments, and Cedar Glen was designed to accommodate their desires. By 1960, however, just 38 percent of all Americans lived in apartments, and apartment shifted from 1940 to 1960 by shifting to a "shoebox" design that emphasized inexpensive rent, small spaces, and fewer rooms.

In 1931, the cities of Cleveland and Cleveland Heights significantly widened Cedar Glen Parkway, bringing traffic and associated noise much closer to Cedar Glen Apartments. The two cities constructed high stone retaining walls on either side of the parkway to hold the hills in place. The Cedar Glen Apartments were sold in December 1931 to the George M. Forman Realty Trust of Chicago. No sales price was disclosed.

The Cleveland Transit System, which operated bus, streetcar, and trackless trolley buses in the city of Cleveland, proposed an RTA Rapid Transit at the foot of Cedar Hill in 1947. Station plans were proposed in January 1952, and approved two months later. Construction on the station began in May 1954, and it opened on March 15, 1955. The new station was a three-minute walk from the Cedar Glen Apartments.

In 1951, the Cedar Glen Apartments were acquired by two investors, T.W. Grogan (head of the T.W. Grogan Co., a local construction firm) and R.R. Hollington (of the Marshman, Hollington & Steadman law firm). No purchase price was reported.

A major fire struck the building on February 27, 1956. The blaze erupted in the kitchen on the first floor of the empty penthouse at 10 P.M., and spread to the second floor. Although the fire was contained by 1 A.M., it continued to burn until daylight as firefighters had difficulty accessing the walls and ceilings due to the building's exceptionally strong design. Heavy water and smoke caused $150,000 ($1,800,000 in 2025 dollars) in damages to central tower.

The Cedar Glen Apartments were sold again in October 1960. Otto and Vilma Psenicka (west side home builders) purchased the structure from Grogan and Hollington for $400,000 ($4,400,000 in 2025 dollars). The Psenickas significantly renovated the building the following year.

=== Condominium conversion ===
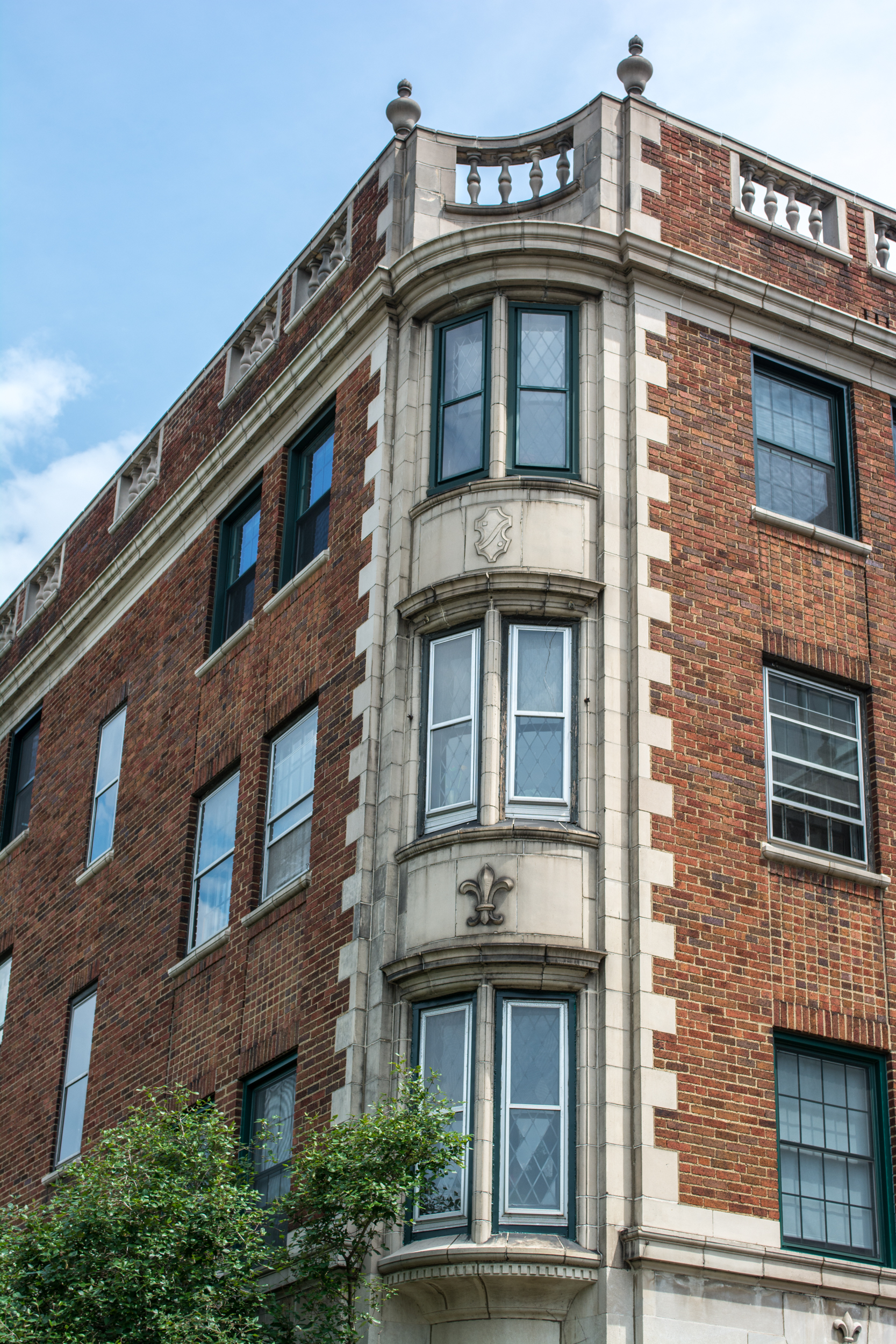
The Cedar Glen Apartments are in the Georgian Revival style, with rooftop balustrades, corner window bays, and extensive brick and stone detailing.

By the 1980s, the Cedar Glen Apartments had lost much of their social cachet. The building was in disrepair due to wear and tear and years of deferred maintenance.

In 1991, the Judson Park retirement community (located across Ambleside Drive) purchased the Cedar Glen Apartments with the intent of razing the structure so that it could build a parking garage on the site. Residents of the Cedar Glen Apartments organized to oppose the demolition, proposing to buy the building themselves and renovate it. Financing for that plan did not materialize. In summer 1993, Judson Park agreed to sell the Cedar Glen Apartments to the local law firm of Climaco Seminatore Lefkowitz & Garofoli for $1.2 million ($2,700,000 in 2025 dollars) and title to the Trigve-Hoff Building at E. 107th Street and Chester Avenue. The new owners planned to convert the building to condominiums. Sale of the building required making several emergency repairs to shore it up, which were financed in part by a $200,000 ($400,000 in 2025 dollars) grant from the Cleveland Division of Economic Development. City officials estimated, however, that another $1.5 million ($3,300,000 in 2025 dollars) in repairs and renovations would still be needed. To help the new owners secure historic tax credits to pay for the repairs, the city of Cleveland designated Cedar Glen Apartments a Cleveland Landmark, and the building owners sought and won designation of the structure as a National Historic site.

The renovation and repair of the building, which topped $3.5 million ($7,800,000 in 2025 dollars), merged three apartments, leaving the structure with 27 condominium units (Note: A later source claims there are 26 units.) with one to four bedrooms each. Each condo unit was renovated one at a time, with buyers offered various packages of improvements to choose from. Cleveland Public Power designed and implemented the building's interior and exterior lighting schemes.

In July 1995, the Cleveland Restoration Society honored Cedar Glen residents Michael and Debbie May for their campaign to save the historic structure, and in negotiating its sale to the Climaco law firm.

== Bibliography ==
- Board of Park Commissioners (1898). Fifth Annual Report of the Board of Park Commissioners of the City of Cleveland, 1897 (Report). Cleveland: The Cleveland Printing and Publishing Co.
- Board of Park Commissioners (1899). Sixth Annual Report of the Board of Park Commissioners of the City of Cleveland, 1898 (Report). Cleveland: The Cleveland Printing and Publishing Co.
- Bremer, Deanna L.; Fisher, Hugh P. (2004). Euclid Golf Neighborhood. Charleston, S.C.: Arcadia Publishing. ISBN 9780738532547.
- Cushing, Henry Platt; Leverett, Frank; Van Horn, Frank R. (1931). Geology and Mineral Resources of the Cleveland District, Ohio. Washington, D.C.: U.S. Government Printing Office.
- Gregor, Sharon E. (2006). Forest Hill: The Rockefeller Estate. Charleston, S.C.: Arcadia Publishing. ISBN 9780738540948.
- Hannibal, Joseph T.; Scherzer, Benjamin A.; Saja, David B. (2007). "The Euclid Bluestone of Northeastern Ohio: Quarrying History, Petrology, and Sedimentology" (PDF). Proceedings of the 40th Forum on the Geology of Industrial Minerals. Indiana Geological Survey Occasional Paper 67: 70–81.
- Johannesen, Eric (1979). Cleveland Architecture, 1876-1976. Cleveland: Western Reserve Historical Society. ISBN 9780911704211.
- Morton, Marian J. (2002). Cleveland Heights: The Making of an Urban Suburb. Charleston, S.C.: Arcadia Publishing. ISBN 9780738523842.
- Morton, Marian J. (2005). Cleveland Heights. Charleston, S.C.: Arcadia Publishing. ISBN 9780738533889.
- Morton, Marian J. (2010). The Overlook of Cleveland and Cleveland Heights, Ohio. Charleston, S.C.: Arcadia Publishing. ISBN 9780738578224.
- Orth, Samuel Peter (1910). A History of Cleveland, Ohio. Chicago: S.J. Clarke Publishing Co.
- Tolman, Jim; Hays, Blaine S. (1996). Horse Trails to Regional Rails: The Story of Public Transit in Greater Cleveland. Kent, Ohio: Kent State University Press. ISBN 9780873385473.
- Wolf, Michael Allan (2008). The Zoning of America: Euclid v. Ambler. Lawrence, Kan.: University Press of Kansas. ISBN 9780700616206.
