= East 105th–Quincy station =

Rapid transit station in Cleveland

E. 105th–Quincy
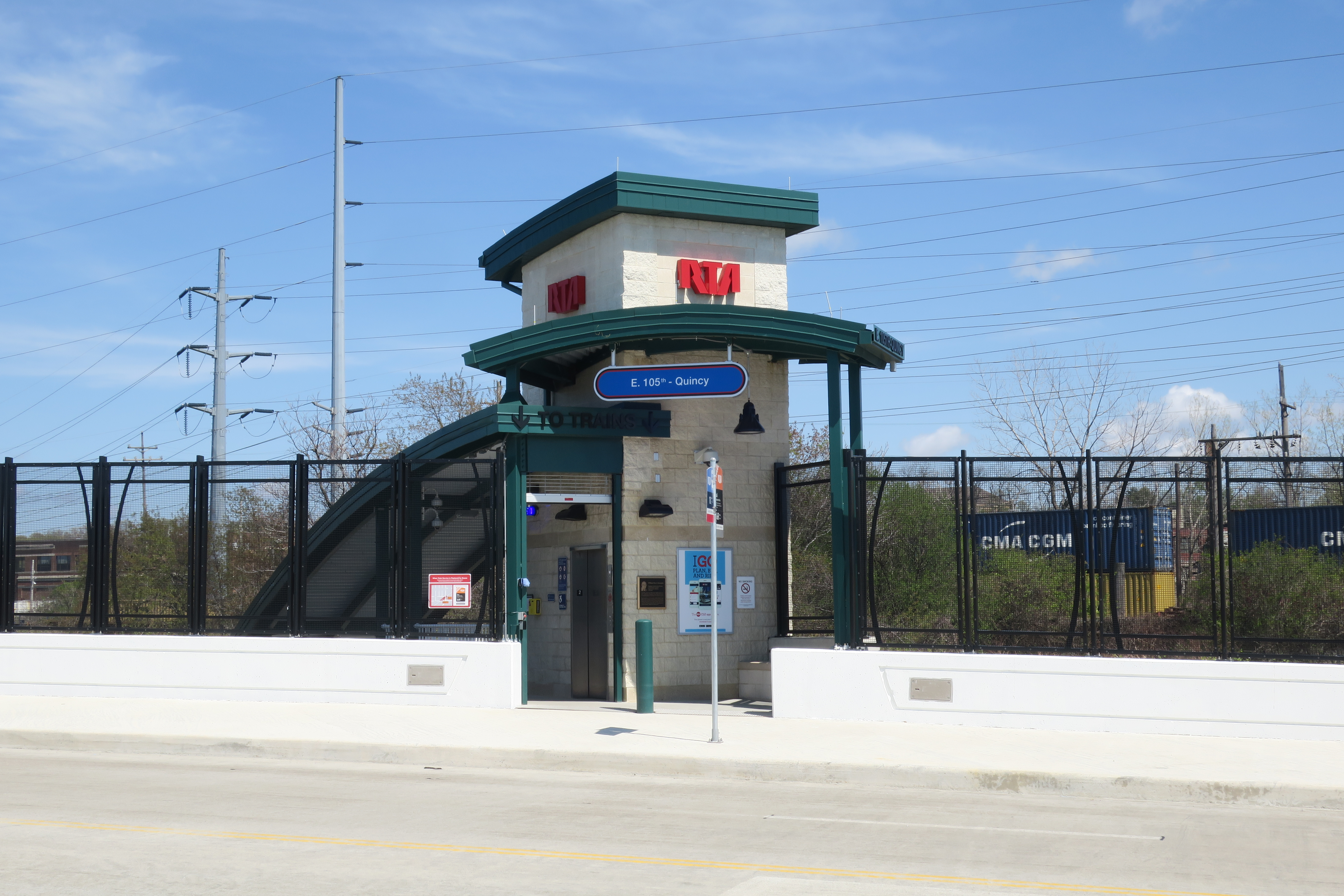
- Entrance to East 105th–Quincy station from East 105th Street, rebuilt in 2019

General information
- Location: 10351 Quincy Avenue; Cleveland, Ohio
- Coordinates: 41°29′37″N 81°36′56″W
- Owner: Greater Cleveland Regional Transit Authority
- Line: NS Lake Erie District
- Platforms: 1 island platform
- Tracks: 2
- Connections: RTA: 8, 10, 11

Construction
- Structure type: Below-grade
- Cycle facilities: Racks
- Accessible: Yes

Other information
- Website: riderta.com/facilities/e105

History
- Opened: March 15, 1955; 71 years ago
- Rebuilt: 2005, 2019
- Former names: Quincy–East 105th
- Original company: Cleveland Transit System

Services
Preceding station	Rapid Transit	Following station
East 79th toward Airport	Red Line	Cedar–University toward Windermere
Location

East 105th–Quincy station is a station on the RTA Red Line in Cleveland, Ohio. It is located in the Fairfax neighborhood on the city's east side. The station has a small entrance on the north side of Quincy Avenue.

== History ==
The station opened on March 15, 1955, as one of the original stations on the CTS Rapid Transit. The original station, which had an entrance on the east side of East 105th Street, lasted almost 50 years.

On January 11, 2005, RTA broke ground for a reconstruction of the station. The station was relocated just west of the original station at East 105th and includes an entrance on Quincy Avenue. The new $1.3 million station opened on November 4, 2005.

Until a 2017–2018 renovation project, the platform at the station was substantially shorter than platforms at other stations on The Red Line as well as shorter than the train itself. Therefore, selective door operation was used; only the first door in the first car adjacent to the operator cab opened while at the platform, requiring detraining passengers to walk to the front of the first car to disembark while passengers who are boarding could only do so through the same one door.

From 2017 to 2019, a renovation project was undertaken to add a second entrance on East 105th Street, which had been planned for after a new bridge was built on East 105th Street. The project resulted in extending the platform to fit the full length of a three-car train. The East 105th entrance opened on April 5, 2019. Station renovations with the reconstruction of the Quincy entrance were completed on June 15, 2019.

Station signage referred to the station as Quincy–East 105th until renovations and expansion were completed.

== Station photos ==
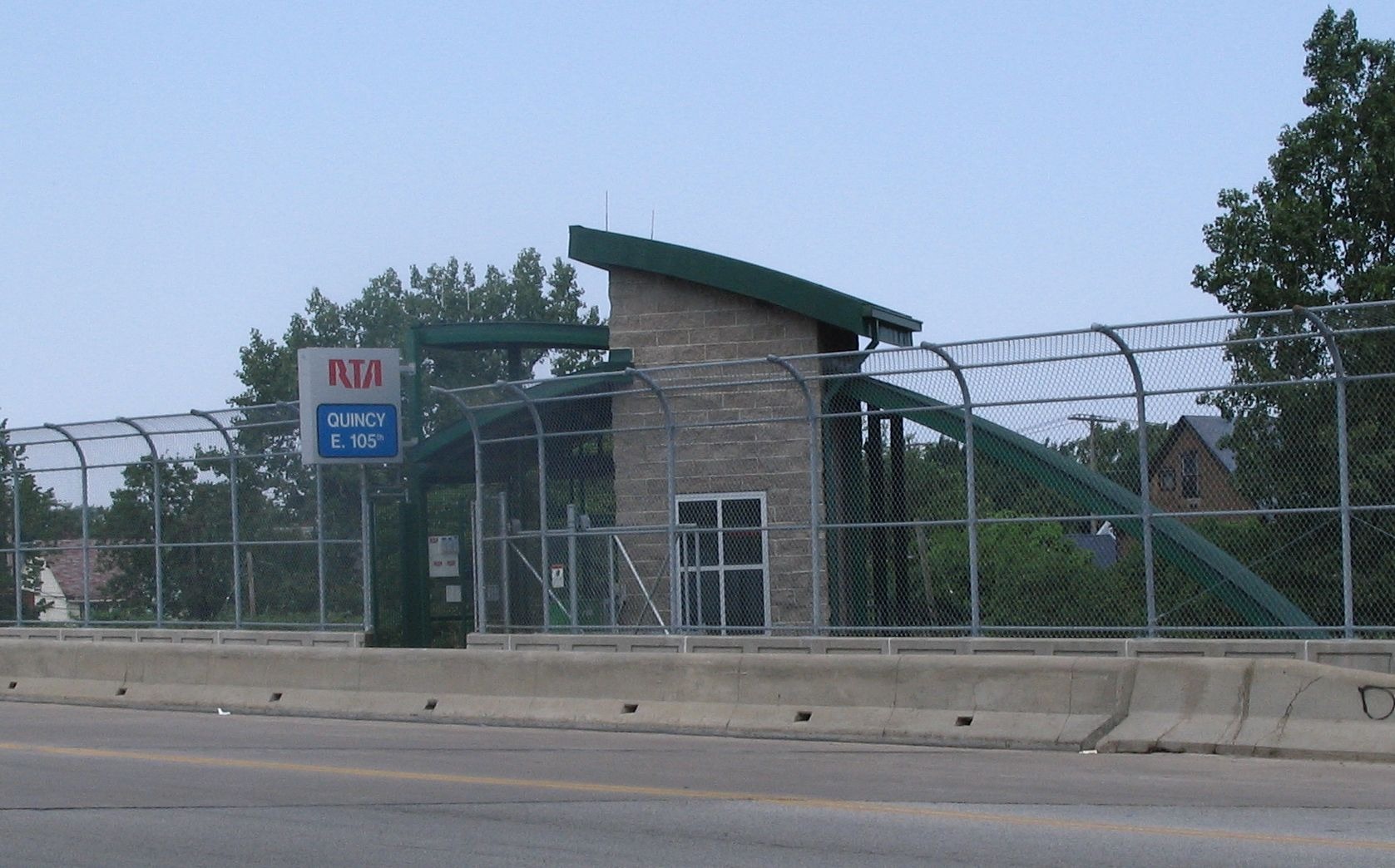
The entrance on Quincy Avenue, built in 2005

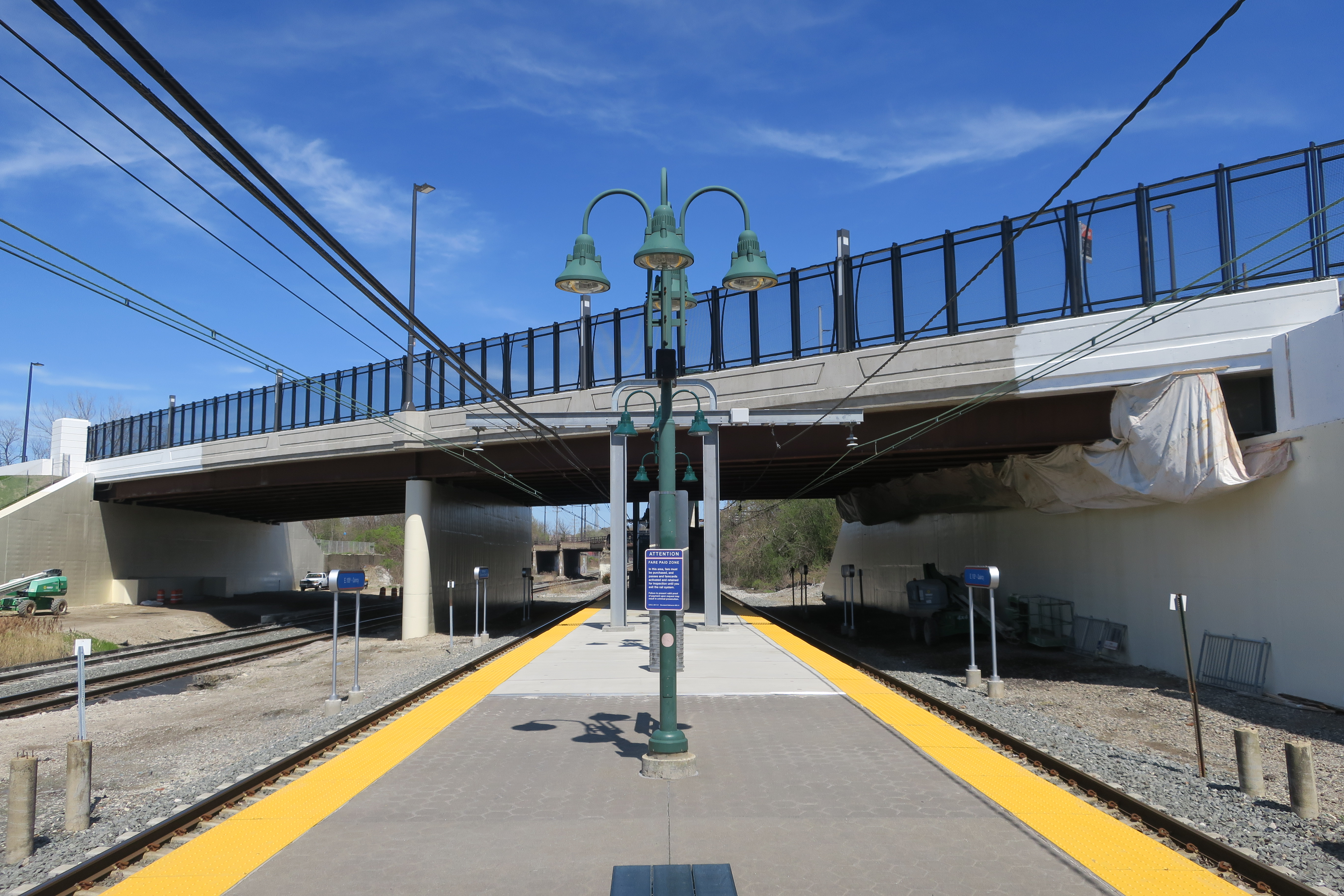
East 105th–Quincy station platform

== Notable places nearby ==
- Karamu House
