= 79th Guards Rocket Artillery Brigade =

- Predecessor: 181st Rocket Brigade
- Founded at: Tver
- Headquarters: Tver, Russia
- Region served: Moscow Military District
- Leader: M.V. Oskolkov
- Awards: Order of the Red Banner, Order of Alexander Nevsky

The 79th Guards Rocket Artillery Brigade (abbreviated in Russian as 79 gv. reabr), Military Unit Number (Войсковая часть) 53956, is an artillery (Multiple rocket launcher) formation of the Russian Ground Forces. It is stationed in Tver. As of 2014 the unit held approximately 300 men (most likely contract servicemen) mostly from Tver Oblast and other neighboring oblasts. This unit holds the Russian MRL "Smerch", and in 2014 the unit was meant to get the successor to the "Smerch" the "Tornado" which is more precise than its predecessor thanks to satellite technology as well as having a range of 1000 km (~600 miles). In September 2014 evidence showed that the brigade may have moved closer to the Ukrainian border at Millerovo Airfield in Rostov Oblast.

== History ==
The 79th Guards Rocket Artillery Brigade has its roots in the Soviet 84th Guards Mortar Regiment. Created in July 1942 this regiment participated in multiple WW2 battles including the Battle of Stalingrad. In 1960 this regiment became the 181st Rocket Brigade which up until 1991 was stationed in East Germany.Following this the 181st Rocket Brigade was turned into the 3rd Rocket Brigade and then, in 1992 in the city of Tver, the modern 79th Guards Rocket Artillery Brigade was created. In September 2014 photographs showed that the brigade may now be stationed closer to the Ukrainian border at Millerovo Airfield.
