= 79th Brigade =

79th Brigade may refer to:

== Russia ==
- 79th Guards Rocket Artillery Brigade
- 79th Separate Guards Motor Rifle Brigade

== Ukraine ==
- 79th Air Assault Brigade

== United Kingdom ==
- 79th Brigade (United Kingdom), British Army infantry formation during World War I
- 79th Brigade, Royal Field Artillery, British Army unit during World War I
- 79th (Lowland) Brigade, Royal Field Artillery, British Army unit after World War I\

== United States ==
- 79th Infantry Brigade Combat Team

== See also ==
- 79th Division (disambiguation)
- 79th Regiment (disambiguation)
