= Cuyahoga County Juvenile Detention Center =

Youth detention center in Cleveland, Ohio

Coordinates: 41°29′52″N 81°40′23.4″W

- Interactive map of Cuyahoga County Juvenile Detention Center
- Location: Cleveland, Ohio
- Status: Operational
- Population: 163 (2007)
- Opened: December 1931; 94 years ago
- Website: http://juvenile.cuyahogacounty.us/

The Cuyahoga County Juvenile Detention Center (CCJDC) is a youth detention center located in Cleveland, Ohio. It is accredited by the American Correctional Association Commission on Accreditation for Corrections. Its average daily population in 2007 was 163 residents, a condition which was described as overcrowded.

CCJDC is the oldest detention center for youths in the United States. It was designed by the Frank W. Bail Co. and opened in December 1931. It was considered a national and international model of court services for children at the time. It is located on the corner of East 22nd Street and Central Avenue in downtown Cleveland. A new nine-story juvenile justice center on Quincy Avenue at East 93rd Street finished constructed in 2010 and opened in 2011. At that time the CCJDC building will be considered surplus by the county. It could be sold, or it could be torn down to make room for a new freeway exit ramp. However, the Ohio Department of Transportation has stated that the building is potentially historic and should not be demolished. The building has been designated a landmark by the City of Cleveland, and it is considered eligible for listing on the National Register of Historic Places.

In February 2010, three inmates escaped through a kitchen. Two of the inmates were found later that day, the third was captured 4 days later.

In April 2024, Fox8 Cleveland obtained and released video of incidents inside the facility throughout 2023, appearing to show juvenile detainees trying to break window glass, jumping another detainee, struggling with detention officers, and destroying property. The county's Executive Office said they were putting $2 Million towards hiring over two dozen new detention officers after past issues with maintaining sufficient staff.

== Life inside ==
The residents of the facility are grouped into 'pods' of 10-20 single rooms. They are allowed calls twice a week for 30 minutes each. According to a document from Cuyahoga County Court of Common Pleas' Juvenile Division, the facility provides 3 meals a day with 3 snacks in between each meal. The kids get haircuts the first and third Thursdays of each month, though it is unclear if they are obligatory or optional. 'Rewards' can be earned through the facility's 'level system' based on behavior, consisting of 5 levels at which a resident can be classified. Each succeeding level allows for greater liberties, such as more visitation privileges or new activities, and commissary. Health services and professionals are contracted out to the healthcare company Wellpath.

Between January 1, 2020 and June 30, 2021 there were 611 reported instances of violence at the Cuyahoga County Juvenile Detention Center.

In 2022, the center was involved in multiple controversies involving an investigation by the County Sheriff's Department into photos of an underage girl and accusations of forced staged fights occurring at the facility.
