= Ambler Heights Historic District =

Historic district in Ohio, United States

- U.S. National Register of Historic Places
- U.S. Historic district
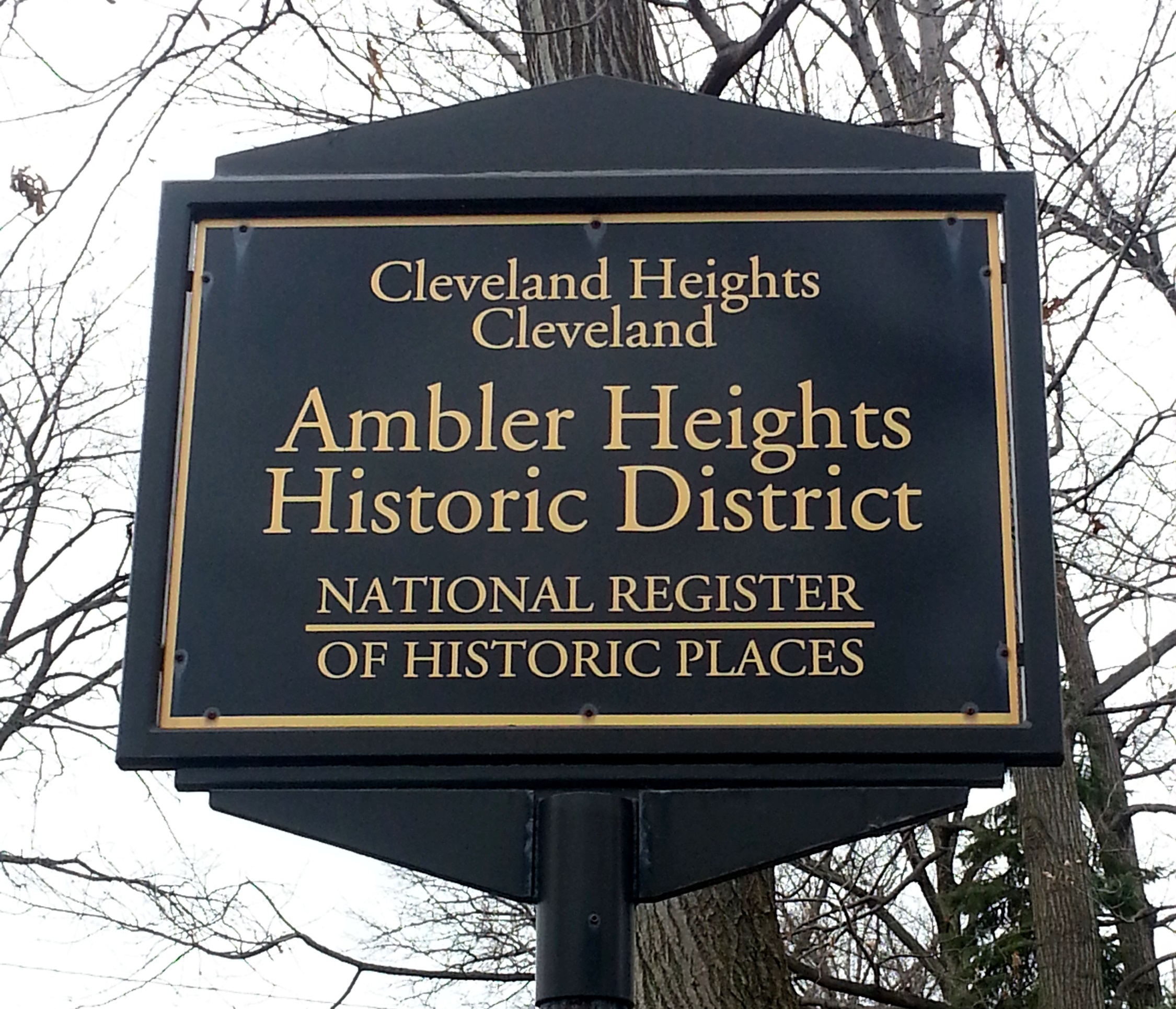
- Entrance sign

- Location within Ohio Location within the United States
- Location: Roughly bounded by Martin Luther King, Jr. Boulevard, Cedar Glen, N. Park Boulevard, and along Harcourt Dr., Cleveland Heights, Ohio
- Coordinates: 41°29′50″N 81°36′4″W
- Area: 73 acres (30 ha)
- Architect: Meade and Hamilton; et al.
- Architectural style: Late 19th and 20th Century revivals, late 19th and early 20th Century American Movements
- NRHP reference No.: 02000883
- Added to NRHP: August 22, 2002

Ambler Heights Historic District is a historic district in Cleveland Heights, Ohio, United States. Listed on the National Register of Historic Places in 2002, it includes 112 contributing buildings in an area of 73 acres (30 ha), which was created between 1903 and 1927.
