= Baker Motor Vehicle Company Building =

- U.S. National Register of Historic Places
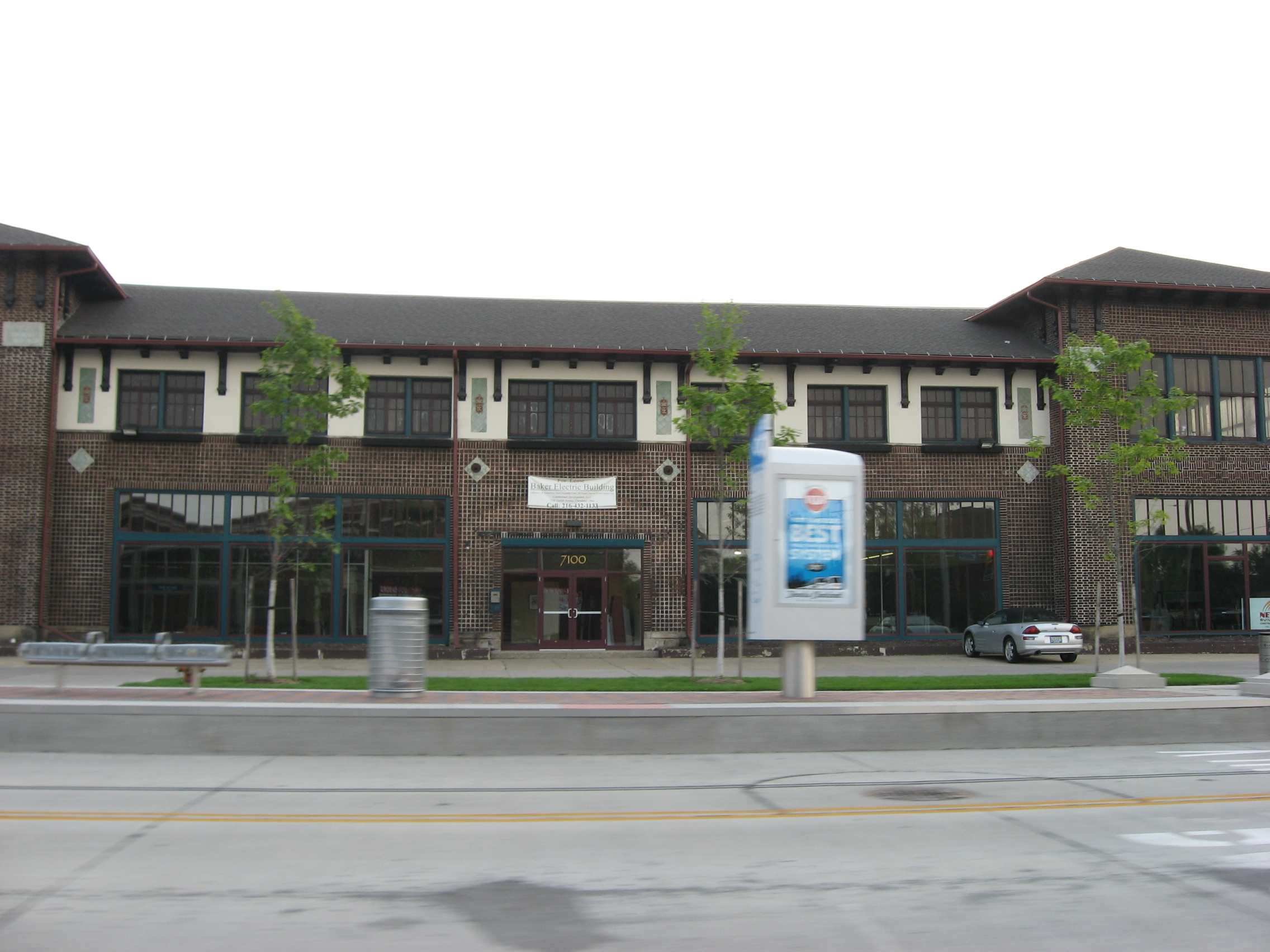

- Location within Cleveland Location within Ohio Location within the United States
- Location: 7100 Euclid Avenue, Cleveland, Ohio, U.S.
- Coordinates: 41°30′13.6″N 81°38′20.2″W
- Built: 1910
- Architect: Frank B. Meade
- Architectural style: Mix of Early Commercial and Mission Revival
- Website: www.healthtechcorridor.com/location/baker-electric/
- NRHP reference No.: 07000071
- Added to NRHP: February 21, 2007

The Baker Motor Vehicle Company Building, also known as the Baker Electric Building, is a historic commercial building in Cleveland, Ohio, in the United States. Built in 1910, it was the first showroom of the Baker Electric Motor Car Co., a pioneer in Brass Era electric automobiles. Baker Electric merged with Rauch and Lang in 1914, and the building was sold in 1920. It served as an auto dealership, machine shop, and print shop for the next 86 years. The structure underwent a two-year renovation and historic preservation from 2006 and 2008, and now serves as a startup business incubator.

The building was added to the National Register of Historic Places on February 21, 2007.

== History of the site ==
The site that would become the Baker Motor Vehicle Company showroom was originally a residence. From the 1860s to the 1920s, Euclid Avenue in Cleveland was known around the world as "Millionaires' Row" for the extensive number of mansions and fine homes that lined the street. The lot at 7100 Euclid Avenue had a Euclid frontage of 150 feet (46 m) and an East 71st Street frontage of 450 feet (140 m). The site had a slight hill on its south end, and Giddings Brook wound around the hill on the west before crossing the property's northern third and heading east. The hill was occupied by a two-story wooden frame house, painted white. The home had a three-story tower and a sharply gabled roof. An extensive front lawn, covered with winding walks and trees, occupied several hundred feet in front of the house. The banks of Giddings Stream were reinforced with stone on both sides. A walled pond, roughly 80 by 160 feet (24 by 49 m) and with a 10-foot-wide (3.0 m) island in the center, was adjacent to the property's eastern border. The house and property were owned by Alonzo F. Winslow, who began managing the American House hotel in Cleveland in 1852. He invented the Winslow corrugated roof iron for railroad freight cars and the Winslow stove for use in railroad passenger cars, which made him a wealthy man. He was a member of the Cleveland City Council from 1857 to 1858, and was elected Cuyahoga County Sheriff in sheriff in 1874. He died in 1908.

== About the building ==
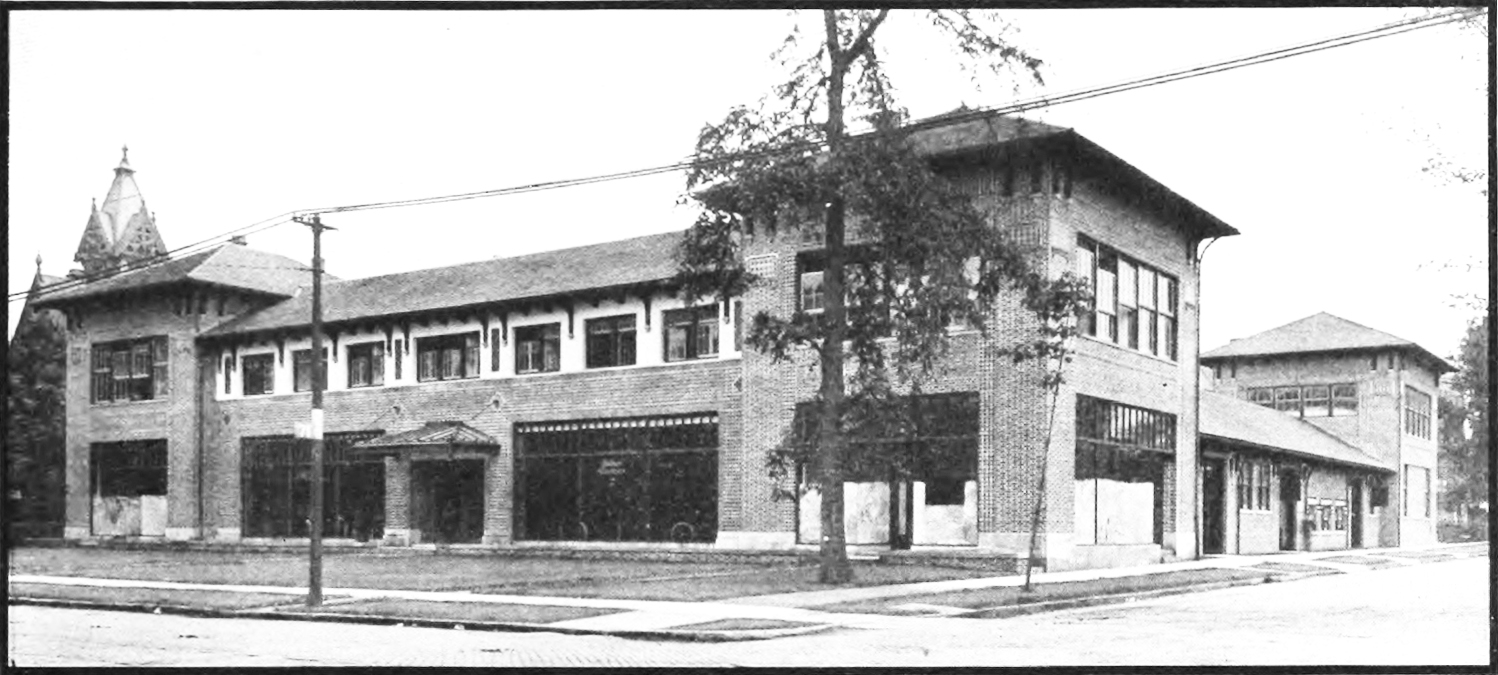
Baker Motor Vehicle Co. building in 1911

In early 1909, the Winslow House was sold to the Baker Electric Motor Car Co. and demolished. The structure was designed by local architect Frank B. Meade in a mix of Early Commercial and Mission Revival styles. (Note: The Plain Dealer newspaper described it as Arts & Crafts styled in 2008.) The building faced Euclid Avenue, and was 160 feet (49 m) wide and 200 feet (61 m) long, and set 50 feet (15 m) back from the street. (Note: One source claims it was 162 feet (49 m) wide and 220 feet (67 m) long.) Between the street and the building was a grass lawn, and a red quarry tile terrace in front of the entrances. Over the two front entrances was a copper canopy.

The building itself was two stories high, with square Mission Revival towers on the northeast and northwest corners. The roof was red tile, and the building walls of brickwork and stone. The mortar joints were wide and raked, and large headers framed the windows. Grueby tiles, some bearing the company's initials, decorated the exterior. Total square footage was reported at between 50,000 square feet (4,600 m^{2}) and 52,000 square feet (4,800 m^{2}).

The front part of the building housed the showroom and the offices. The showroom was 96 feet (29 m) wide and 36 feet (11 m) deep, and large plate glass windows looked out onto the street. Rohrheimer-Brooks, Cleveland's top interior design studio, designed and decorated the showrooms and associated spaces. These included a public office, large and small private office, women's toilet and anteroom, men's toilet, and separate men's and women's reception areas. The showroom and offices were paneled in oak stained silver-grey, although the two end walls were painted grey smooth plaster. The ceiling was open beam, and decorative crests were carved into each oak wall panel. Large lighting fixtures with Frink reflectors hung from the showroom ceiling, and the floor was covered in ceramic tile in a checked pattern with an intricate border. The reception rooms were painted with a silver-grey paint to harmonize with the showroom, and the furniture, light fixtures, and most other fittings were finished to look like silver. (Note: All the doorknobs and plumbing and window fixtures were bronze.)

Garages and repair shops occupied the rear of the building. On the east and south sides were repair bays, and on the south a paint and upholstery shop. Directly behind the showroom and northwest reception space was a 120-by-70-foot (37 by 21 m) two bay garage for the servicing of electric cars. It had a separate entrance and exit on E. 71st Street, a car wash station, and a turntable. The floor was concrete, and the roof pierced by skylights. The electric garage had 60 charging stations, and the capacity to hold 80 cars in four tiers of elevated racks. Behind the electric garage was a 70-by-35-foot (21 by 11 m) one bay garage for the servicing of gasoline-powered cars. It had a single entrance/exit on E. 71st Street, a car wash station, and two turntables. The floor was concreted, and the roof pierce by skylights. A small elevator pierced the floor and led to a 50-by-35-foot (15 by 11 m) battery room in the basement. The gasoline garage had the capacity to hold 30 cars in four tiers of elevated racks. The small repair bays to the east of the two garages were for electric and gasoline cars, respectively. Between them was a tire room and a small oil storage room. On the south wall were the small upholstery shop and the larger paint shop.

On the second floor above the showroom were several small apartments. A 60-car parking lot existed in back of the building.

The Baker Electric Motor Car Co. building was first occupied on May 2, 1910. The showroom was utilized by both Baker Electric and Standard Automobile Co. salesmen. (Note: Standard Automobile was the Packard Motor Car Company distributor for Cleveland.)

Industry magazines called the building a "model" for other dealerships, and the electric car garage was considered the finest in the nation.

== Subsequent history ==
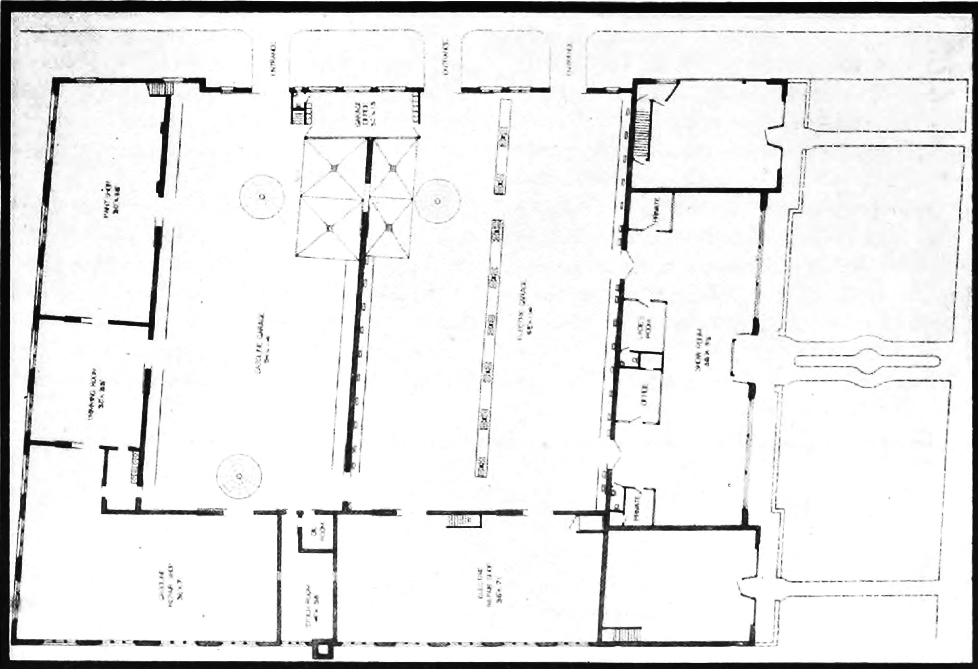
Plan of the first floor of the structure, as of 1911

Faced with significant competition from the gasoline-powered automobile and declining sales of electric cars, Baker Electric merged with the Rauch & Lang Carriage Company in 1916. Production of electric passenger vehicles ceased in 1919.

In 1920, the building was sold to the A.L. Englander Motor Co., which used to showroom to sell Hupp Motor Cars and, later, Pontiacs and Buicks. Englander closed its doors in March 1942, and the building was sold to the A.W. Hecker Co., which used it as a machine shop. Hecker bricked up nearly all the large windows of the former showroom, covered the oak paneling with drywall, and laid asphalt floor tiles over the ceramic flooring. The company also installed a dropped ceiling that covered the skylights in the garages and the original lighting in the showroom.

The building was purchased by the newly formed GCC Corp. for $100,000 ($1,000,000 in 2025 dollars) in July 1966 for use as a print shop. The building was renovated from 1980 to 1985 at a cost of $100,000 ($300,000 in 2025 dollars). GCC's parent company closed the print business in 2000, leaving the building empty. Creeping ivy covered the building.

=== 2006-2008 remodeling ===
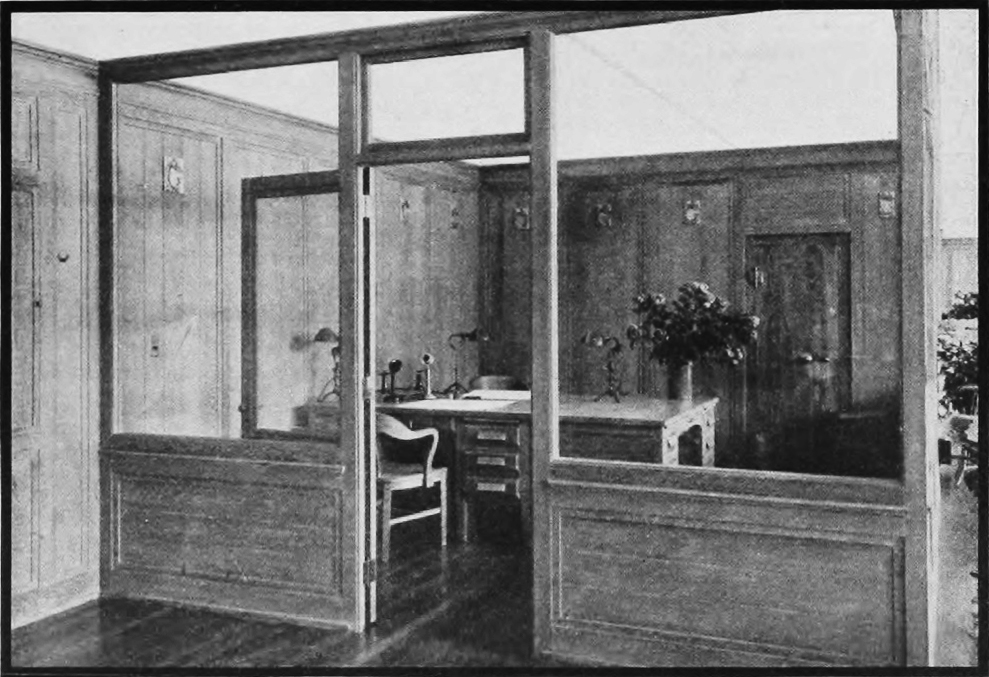
Public office in the showrom in 1911.

Cleveland developer Dick Pace considered purchasing the Baker building in 2002, but passed. By 2006, however, the HealthLine bus rapid transit project was under construction along Euclid Avenue, and the Cleveland Clinic was beginning to rapidly expand. Pace purchased the still-empty structure for $780,000 ($1,200,000 in 2025 dollars.

Over the next two years, Pace spent $7 million ($10,500,000 in 2025 dollars transforming the building into laboratory, light industry, and office space for startup companies. The building was added to the National Register of Historic Places in 2007 for its association with the Cleveland's automobile industry and the electric automobile, and Pace received extensive historic preservation tax credits (Note: Pace says he was unaware that locally famous architect Frank B. Meade designed the structure when he bought it.) which paid for 40 percent of the renovation's cost. The showroom windows were unbricked, the dropped ceiling and drywall removed, and the original ceramic floor restored.

The extensive renovations included making the building LEED Silver certified. To achieve this level of certification, extensive amounts of reclaimed building materials were used, all removed materials were repurposed, and a geothermal heat pump installed to help heat and cool the building. Because air conditioning systems were needed for each building tenant, multiple rooftop air conditioning units were required. To meet LEED Silver standards, 28,476 square feet (2,645.5 m^{2}) of modified bitumen membrane and 8,500 square feet (790 m^{2}) of EPDM rubber were removed from the roof and replaced with 0.5-inch (1.3 cm) high-density wood panels with a high R-value. On top of this were 3 inches (7.6 cm) of soy polyurethane foam; a base, intermediate, and top coat of silicone coating (each 0.001 inches (0.025 mm) thick); and a silicone sealant. The high R-value of the roof allowed significant downsizing of the air conditioning and other HVAC equipment.

By 2009, the Baker Motor Vehicle Building was 70 percent occupied.

In 2010, the city of Cleveland installed one of the first public electric vehicle recharging stations at the Baker Motor Vehicle Building—bringing electric automobile charging back to the building 90 years after it was removed.
