= 79th Regiment =

79th Regiment may refer to:

== Infantry units ==
- 79th Infantry Regiment (Imperial Japanese Army)
- 79th (The Queen's Own Cameron Highlanders) Regiment of Foot, a unit of the British Army, raised in 1793
- 79th Regiment of Foot (1757), a British Army unit that took part in the Seven Years' War
- 79th Regiment of Foot (Royal Liverpool Volunteers), a British Army unit that saw service in the West Indies during the American Revolution

=== Union Army units in the American Civil war ===
- 79th United States Colored Infantry Regiment
- 79th Illinois Infantry Regiment
- 79th Indiana Infantry Regiment
- 79th New York Infantry Regiment
- 79th Ohio Infantry Regiment
- 79th Pennsylvania Infantry Regiment

== Other units ==
- 79th Field Artillery Regiment, United States

== See also ==
- 79th Brigade (disambiguation)
- 79th Division (disambiguation)
