= 79th Division =

In military terms, 79th Division may refer to:

== Infantry units ==
- 79th Division (People's Republic of China)
- 79th Reserve Division, German Empire
- 79th Infantry Division (Wehrmacht), Germany
- 79th Division (Imperial Japanese Army)
- 79th Infantry Division (Russian Empire)
- 79th Guards Rifle Division, Soviet Union
- 79th Motor Rifle Division, Soviet Union
- 79th Infantry Division (United States)

== Other units ==
- 79th Armoured Division, United Kingdom

== See also ==
- List of military divisions by number
- 79th Brigade (disambiguation)
- 79th Regiment (disambiguation)
- 79th Squadron (disambiguation)
