= East 79th station (GCRTA Red Line) =

Rapid transit station in Cleveland

E. 79th St.
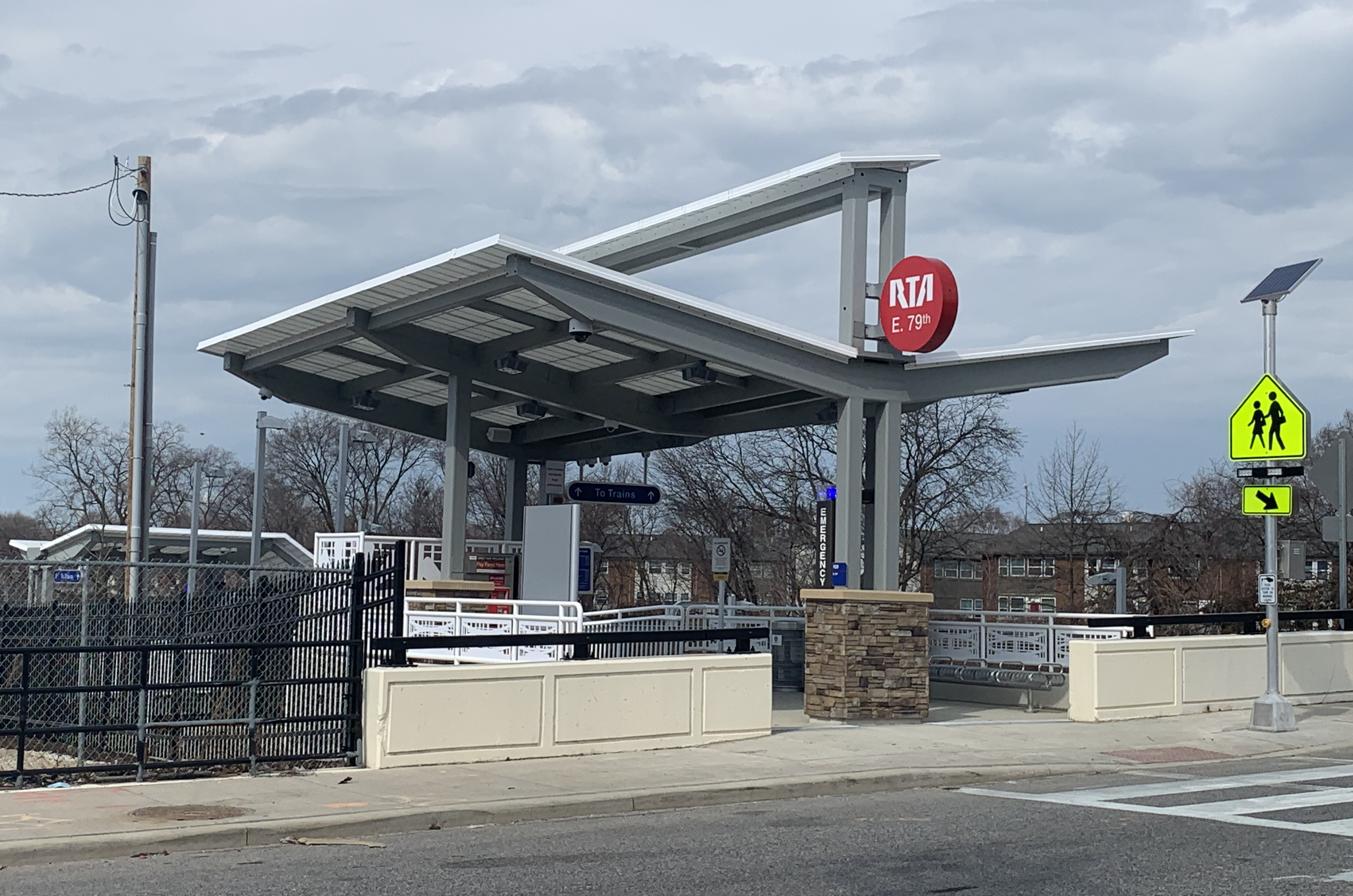
- East 79th station entrance in March 2021

General information
- Location: 2700 East 79th Street; Cleveland, Ohio
- Coordinates: 41°29′10″N 81°38′00″W
- Owner: Greater Cleveland Regional Transit Authority
- Line: NS Lake Erie District
- Platforms: 1 island platform
- Tracks: 2
- Connections: RTA: 2

Construction
- Structure type: Below-grade
- Cycle facilities: Racks
- Accessible: Yes

Other information
- Website: riderta.com/facilities/e79red

History
- Opened: March 15, 1955; 71 years ago
- Rebuilt: 2021
- Original company: Cleveland Transit System

Services
Preceding station	Rapid Transit	Following station
East 55th toward Airport	Red Line	East 105th–Quincy toward Windermere
Location

East 79th station (signed as East 79th Street) is a station on the RTA Red Line in Cleveland, Ohio. It is located on the west side of East 79th Street between Woodland Avenue and Grand Avenue. The entrance is on the east side of East 79th Street.

The station opened along with CTS Rapid Transit on March 15, 1955. It originally served nearby industrial facilities, such as the Van Dorn Company, as well as a connection for the East 79th Street bus line. With the closing of most of the industrial facilities adjacent to the station, passenger boardings have decreased so that it has become one of the least used stations on the Red Line. RTA had considered closing the station or moving it to the intersection of Woodland Avenue and Buckeye Road. In early 2020, the RTA made the decision to renovate the station, with construction scheduled to finish in the summer of 2021. The station renovation was completed ahead of schedule, and reopened on March 10, 2021.

== Station photos ==
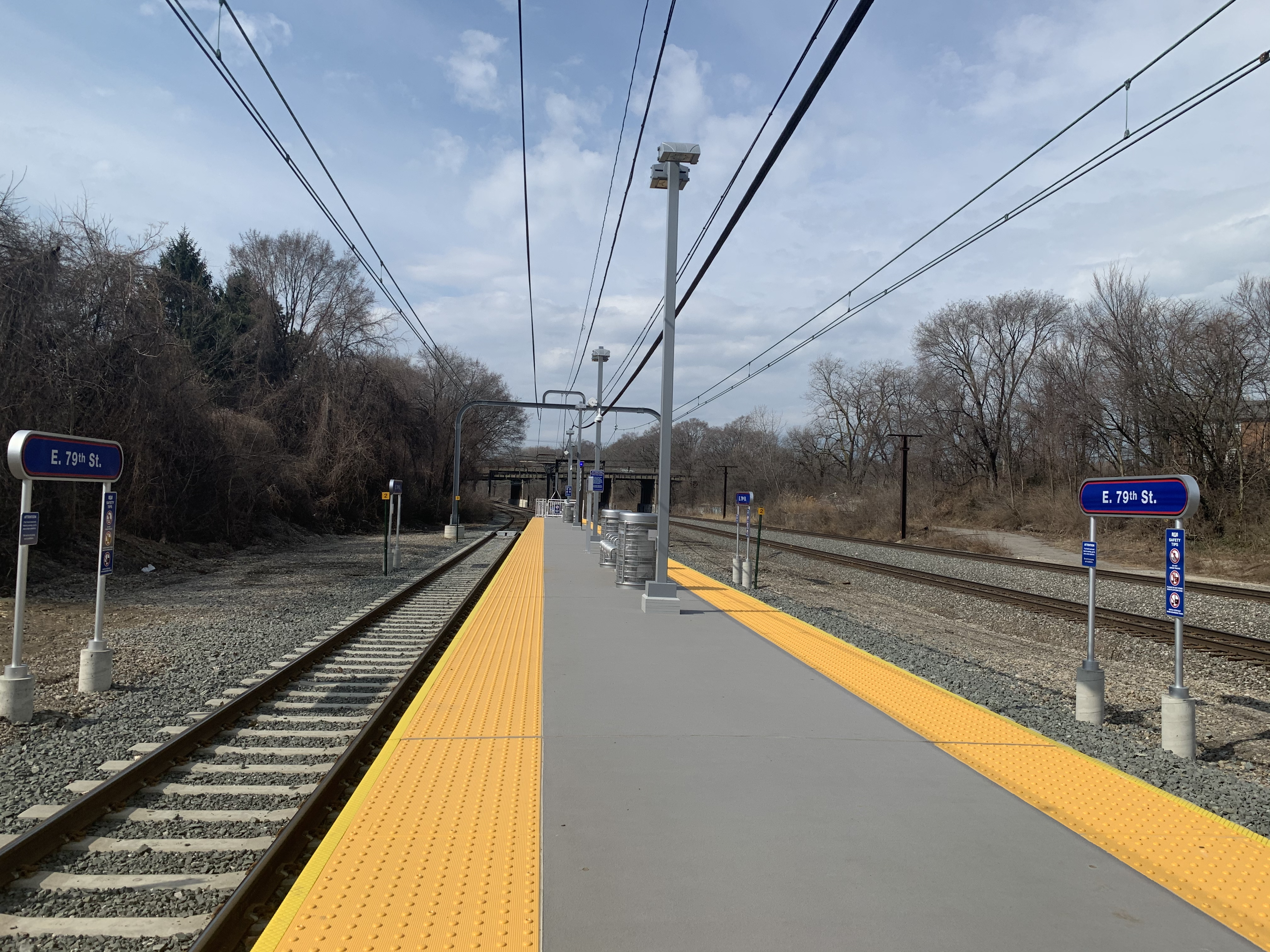
Station platform in 2021

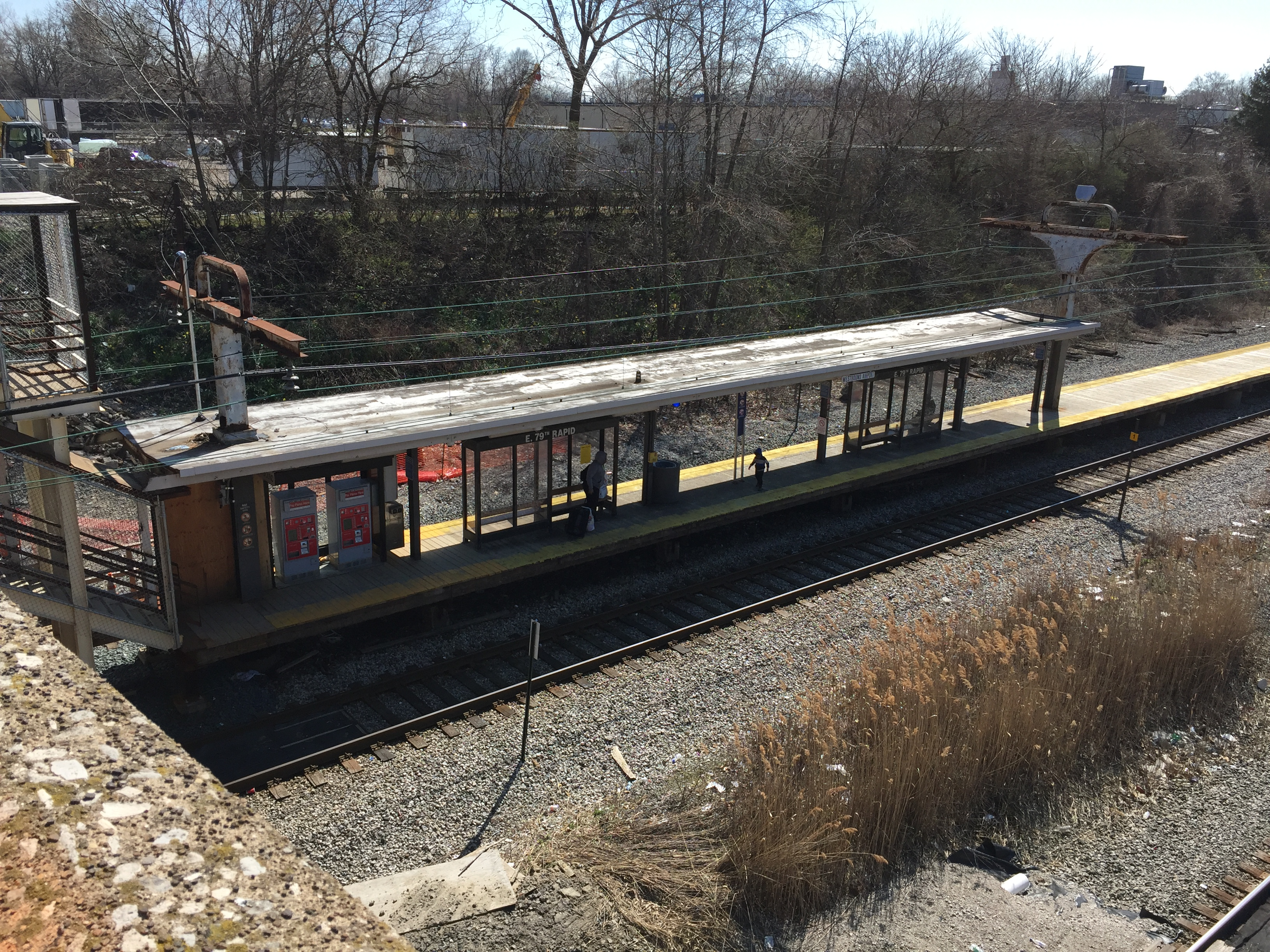
Former CTS station platform in 2016
