= Little Italy–University Circle station =

Rapid transit station in Cleveland

Mayfield Road Little Italy–University Circle
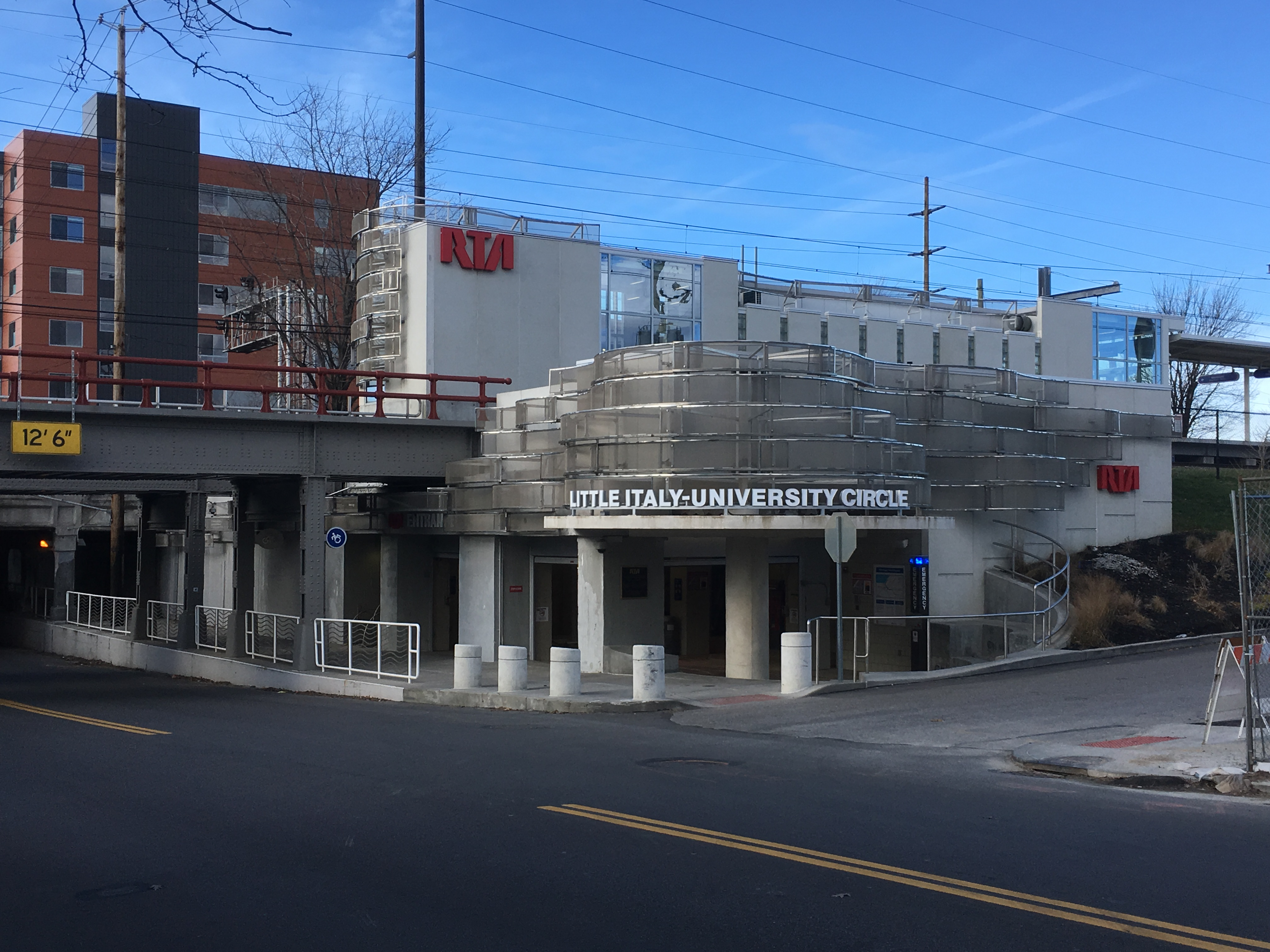
- Little Italy–University Circle station entrance

General information
- Location: 11851 Mayfield Road; Cleveland, Ohio
- Coordinates: 41°30′31″N 81°36′1″W
- Owner: Greater Cleveland Regional Transit Authority
- Lines: NS Lake Erie District; CSX Cleveland Short Line Subdivision
- Platforms: 1 island platform
- Tracks: 2
- Connections: RTA: 9 CircleLink: BlueLink

Construction
- Structure type: Embankment
- Cycle facilities: Racks
- Accessible: Yes

Other information
- Website: riderta.com/facilities/littleitalyuc

History
- Opened: August 11, 2015; 11 years ago

Services
Preceding station	Rapid Transit	Following station
Cedar–University toward Airport	Red Line	Superior toward Windermere
Location

Little Italy–University Circle station (signed as Mayfield Road, Little Italy–University Circle) is a station on the RTA Red Line in the University Circle neighborhood of Cleveland, Ohio. It is located at the Mayfield Road (U.S. Route 322) and East 119 Street intersection, near the western end of Little Italy.

== History ==
The station was built to replace the older Red Line station located at Euclid and East 120th street approximately 0.3 miles (0.48 km) north which RTA deemed to be functionally obsolete.

Construction began in October 2013 and reuses an old vault under the railroad bridges as the lobby area. The vault was built in the 1920s as a potential commuter rail station by the Van Sweringen brothers and was composed of passenger tunnels and stairways. As part of the construction, a new headhouse, entrance plaza, and platform were built, an elevator installed, and two transit track bridges were rehabilitated. In addition, multiple pieces of public art were installed in the station, and new concrete sidewalks, landscaping, and lighting were added, as well as repairs made to the bridge abutment.

The station opened on August 11, 2015, making it the first new station on the Red Line since 1969 when Brookpark station opened.

== Notable places nearby ==
- Little Italy
- Case Western Reserve University (northern campus)
- University Hospitals Case Medical Center
- Cozad–Bates House
- Museum of Contemporary Art Cleveland
- Holy Rosary Church
- Cleveland Feast of the Assumption Festival
- Alta Public Library
- Mayfield Cemetery
- Lake View Cemetery
