= John Ewing =

John Ewing may refer to:

== Public officials ==
- John Ewing (Indiana politician) (1789–1858), American congressman
- John Hoge Ewing (1796–1887), American congressman from Pennsylvania
- John Ewing (diplomat) (1857–1923), American Envoy Extraordinary and Minister Plenipotentiary to Honduras, 1913–1918
- John Ewing (Australian politician) (1863–1933), member of Western Australia Legislative Assembly
- John H. Ewing (1918–2012), American assemblyman and state senator from New Jersey, a/k/a Jack Ewing
- John Ewing Jr., American politician from Nebraska, elected mayor of Omaha in 2025

== Writers ==
- John Ewing (pastor) (1732–1802), American university president and sermon writer in Philadelphia
- John T. Ewing (1856–1926), American historian and university administrator in Michigan
- John D. Ewing (1892–1952), American journalist, editor and publisher in Louisiana
- John Ewing (curator), American film historian and reviewer at Cleveland Museum of Art and Cinematheque

== Others ==
- John C. Ewing (1843–1918), American Civil War Medal of Honor recipient
- John Ewing (goldminer) (1844–1922), Scottish-born New Zealand pioneer
- John Ewing (baseball) (1863–1895), American pitcher during 1880s and 1890s
- John "Streamline" Ewing (1917–2002), American jazz trombonist

== Characters ==
- John Ross Ewing Jr. (J. R. Ewing), amoral oil baron on 1978 American TV series Dallas, played by Larry Hagman
- John Ross Ewing Sr. (Jock Ewing), father of J. R. Ewing on Dallas, played by Jim Davis and Dale Midkiff
- John Ross Ewing III, son of J. R. Ewing on Dallas, played by Omri Katz and Josh Henderson

== See also ==
- Jon Ewing (1936–2014), Australian stage, film and TV actor and director
