= Italian American Museum of Cleveland =

Museum in Ohio, United States

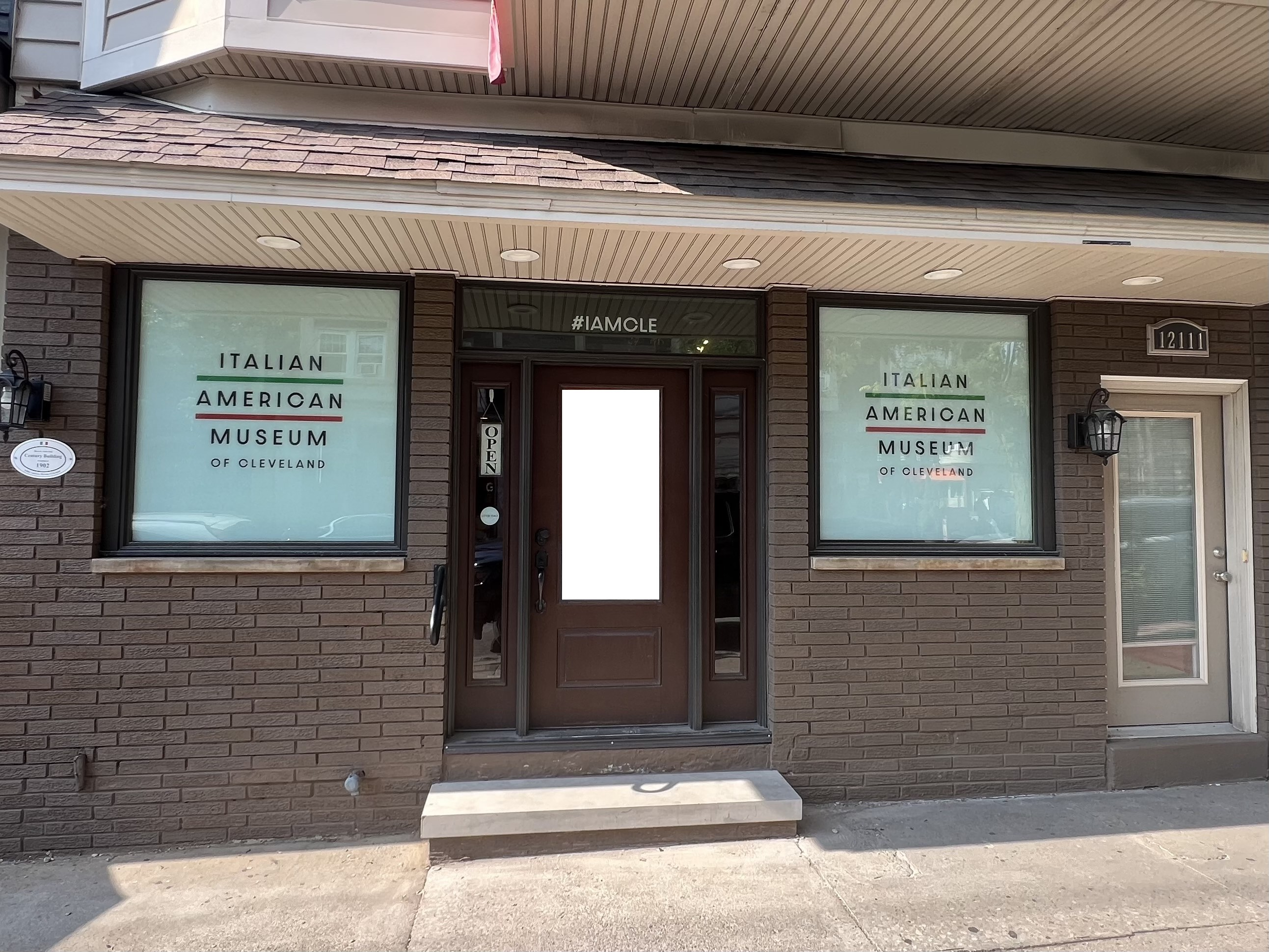
- Established: October 12, 2020
- Location: Cleveland, Ohio
- Coordinates: 41°30′31.8″N 81°35′53.4″W
- Founder: Basil M. Russo
- Director: Pamela Dorazio Dean
- Website: iamcle.org

The Italian American Museum of Cleveland (Italian: Museo Italo-Americano di Cleveland; abbreviated as IAMCLE) is a museum in the Little Italy neighborhood of Cleveland, Ohio, emphasizing the heritage, history, identity, and traditions of the city's Italian American community. The museum was founded by veteran Cleveland judges Basil M. Russo and Deborah J. Nicastro on Columbus Day 2020, replacing one that had closed in 2007. A soft opening to the public was held in July 2021, with an official grand opening on October 1, 2021. The museum is sponsored by the Italian Sons and Daughters of America (ISDA), and works in partnership with the Western Reserve Historical Society.

== See also ==
- Cleveland Feast of the Assumption Festival
