= Cleveland Cinematheque =

Repertory movie theater in Cleveland, Ohio

The Cleveland Institute of Art Cinematheque
- Established: 1984; 42 years ago
- Headquarters: Cleveland Institute of Art
- Location(s): 11610 Euclid Ave; Cleveland, OH
- Coordinates: 41.5104°N 81.6024°W
- Public Transit: Little Italy–University Circle station
- Founders: John Ewing, Ron Holloway, & George Gund III
- Director: Bilgesu Sisman
- Website: www.cia.edu/cinematheque/

The Cleveland Institute of Art Cinematheque is an alternative and repertory film theatre located in the University Circle neighborhood of Cleveland, Ohio.

== History ==
The Cleveland Cinematheque, as it is colloquially known, was founded in 1984 by John Ewing, Ron Holloway, and George Gund III. Originally housed at Case Western Reserve University, the Cleveland Institute of Art has been home to the non-profit since 1986. John Ewing served as director and programmer from its founding until June 30, 2024.

On August 1, 2015, The Cinematheque moved into its current space, the Peter B. Lewis Theater, a purpose built 300-seat cinema with 7.1 surround sound, 4K DCP, 16mm, and 35mm projection capabilities.

Turkish film scholar Bilgesu Sisman became the Cinematheque's second director on July 1, 2024.

== Programming ==
The Cleveland Cinematheque shows films that wouldn't otherwise come to the region. Each film programmed is a Cleveland exclusive at the time of its showing. It serves as both revival house and contemporary art house cinema. It releases a screening schedule of classic and current films every other month.
