= University Circle =

Neighborhood of Cleveland, Ohio, United States

- Neighborhood of Cleveland

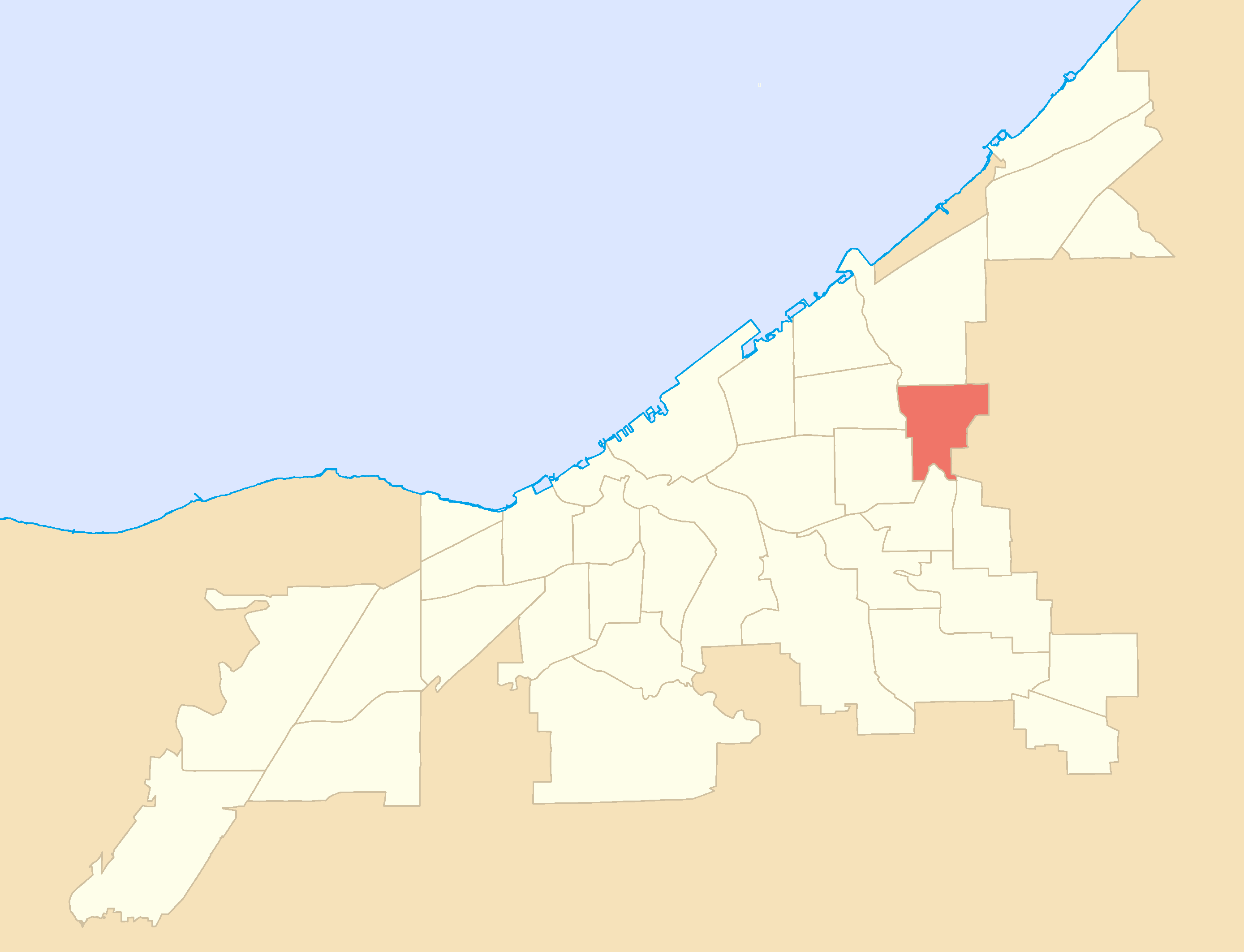
- Coordinates: 41°30′31″N 81°36′19″W
- Country: United States
- State: Ohio
- County: Cuyahoga County
- City: Cleveland

Population (2020)
  - Total: 7,661

Demographics
  - White: 56.4%
  - Black: 21.6%
  - Hispanic (of any race): 3%
  - Asian and Pacific Islander: 17.7%
  - Mixed and Other: 4.3%
- Time zone: UTC-5 (EST)
  - Summer (DST): UTC-4 (EDT)
- ZIP Codes: 44106
- Area code: 216
- Median income: $17,194
- Source: 2020 U.S. Census, City Planning Commission of Cleveland

University Circle is a district in the neighborhood of University on the East Side of Cleveland, Ohio. It is home to the Cleveland Museum of Art, Severance Hall (home to the Cleveland Orchestra), the Cleveland Institute of Art, the Cleveland Cinematheque, Case Western Reserve University, the Cleveland Institute of Music, the Museum of Contemporary Art Cleveland, the Cleveland Botanical Garden, historic Lake View Cemetery, the Cleveland Museum of Natural History, and University Hospitals Cleveland Medical Center.

Encompassing approximately 550 acres (220 ha) the University neighborhood is bordered to the north by the Glenville neighborhood, to the south by the Buckeye-Shaker neighborhood, to the west and southwest by the neighborhoods of Hough and Fairfax (also known as Midtown) and to the east by the cities of East Cleveland and Cleveland Heights. University Circle is member of the Global Cultural Districts Network.

While the population of University Circle ranks on the lower end of Cleveland's 36 defined Statistical Planning Areas (SPAs), it ranks near the top in importance to the city's economic sector. Neighborhood businesses and institutions provide the city with more than 30,000 jobs in a variety of fields, including averaging 1,000 new jobs per year since 2005. Nearby attractions draw approximately 2.5 million visitors annually. As the neighborhood's name implies, higher learning is a major part of the culture of University Circle, with over 13,000 undergraduate, graduate, and professional students attending the area's various institutions. University Circle Inc., a not-for-profit corporation established in 1957, serves as the neighborhood chamber of commerce, providing many administrative and quasi-governmental functions for the area, including security, transportation administration, and marketing. University Circle has its own full-service police department to provide security and patrol the area.

== Media coverage ==
In 2021, USA Today ranked University Circle #1 as the "Best Arts District" in America. Forbes ranked University as one of America's Prettiest Neighborhoods; with high praise for its symphony orchestra, museums, botanical garden, planetarium, high-end foods, world class culture, and walkability. In a 2007 USA Today article entitled "10 great places to discover Italy in America", Mario Batali was quoted as saying, "Corbo's Bakery has the best cassata (cake) I have tried in the USA." The article listed Cleveland's Little Italy as a top ten Little Italy in America. Askmen.com ranked Cleveland's Little Italy #3 out of 10 in their list of "Top 10: Little Italies".

== Notable institutions and landmarks ==
Points of interest in the University Circle neighborhood include:

- Case Western Reserve University
  - Adelbert Hall
  - Allen Memorial Medical Library
  - DiSanto Field
  - Michelson-Morley Memorial Fountain
  - Milton and Tamar Maltz Performing Arts Center
- Severance Hall (Home to the Cleveland Orchestra)
- The Cleveland Museum of Art
- The Cleveland Museum of Natural History
- The Cleveland Botanical Garden
- The Museum of Contemporary Art Cleveland (MOCA)
- The Cleveland Institute of Art
- The Cleveland Institute of Music and the Cleveland Music School Settlement
- Cleveland Cinematheque
- University Hospitals Cleveland Medical Center
  - Rainbow Babies & Children's Hospital
  - Seidman Cancer Center
  - MacDonald Women's Hospital
- The Western Reserve Historical Society
  - Crawford Auto-Aviation Museum
  - Cleveland History Center
- The Dittrick Museum of Medical History
- Lake View Cemetery
  - James A. Garfield Memorial
  - Wade Memorial Chapel
- Rockefeller Park
- Cozad–Bates House Interpretive Center
- John Hay High School
- Cleveland School of the Arts
- Nottingham-Spirk Innovation Center
- Tara Seibel Art Gallery
- Hawken School University Circle campus
- Montessori Elementary at Holy Rosary

== History ==
=== 19th century ===
University Circle was known during the early 19th century as Doan's Corners, after Nathanial Doan, a member of the Connecticut Land Company, who settled his family and started a community there.

The name "University Circle" began to take shape in the 1880s. Western Reserve University moved its campus from Hudson, Ohio, to Euclid Avenue in 1883. Case School of Applied Science moved from Downtown Cleveland to a site next to WRU in 1885. Their relocation led to the birth of an educational center and the creation of a new community called University Circle, named in part after these new institutions—but also the circular street intersection and trolley turnaround located at Euclid Avenue and Doan Brook Boulevard (Martin Luther King Jr Boulevard today).

By the 1890s, the Western Reserve School of Design for Women (Cleveland Institute of Art) moved to University Circle, and the concept of developing a world-class arts and cultural center came to life. The concept became more concrete when Jeptha Wade, a trustee of Western Reserve University, set aside land for the Cleveland Museum of Art to be built in the Circle, which required the Cleveland Zoological Park, now known as the Cleveland Metroparks Zoo, to be relocated to its present-day location of Old Brooklyn. The Historical Society (Western Reserve Historical Society) joined these institutions before the start of the 20th century.

=== 20th century ===
The Circle began to grow rapidly in the early 20th century. The Cleveland Museum of Art opened its doors in 1916. By the 1920s and 1930s, 19 educational and cultural institutions were located in the area, from the Cleveland Museum of Natural History to the Cleveland Hearing and Speech Center to the Cleveland Botanical Garden and others.

Cleveland's college football scene began in University Circle through both Case and Western Reserve football teams. Van Horn Field hosted games against Ohio State, Notre Dame, and Alabama. Famed Notre Dame coach Knute Rockne made his coaching debut against Case in University Circle in 1918. In 1920, The Alabama Crimson Tide played their first ever game in the north at Van Horn Field against Case.

The arrival of University Hospitals in 1931 (founded in 1866) led to health care becoming another center of innovation in University Circle. Less than one mile (1.6 km) away from University Hospitals, the Cleveland Clinic had been serving its patients since 1921. Also in 1931 Severance Hall, home of the Cleveland Orchestra, was constructed at the corner of Euclid and East Boulevard. By 1950, 34 institutions had chosen University Circle as their home. In 1967, Case School of Applied Science and Western Reserve University confederated to become Case Western Reserve University.

=== 21st century ===
University Circle remains Cleveland's center for cultural, educational, religious, and social-service institutions. The area is currently undergoing many construction projects with many institutions expanding, and private development of residential and commercial dwellings. New housing developments in the area have increased the number of year-round residents in the area to an estimated 15,000 as of 2013.

In 2012, the Museum of Contemporary Art (MoCA) opened its new permanent location in University Circle at the corner of Mayfield Road and Euclid Avenue.

== Public transportation ==
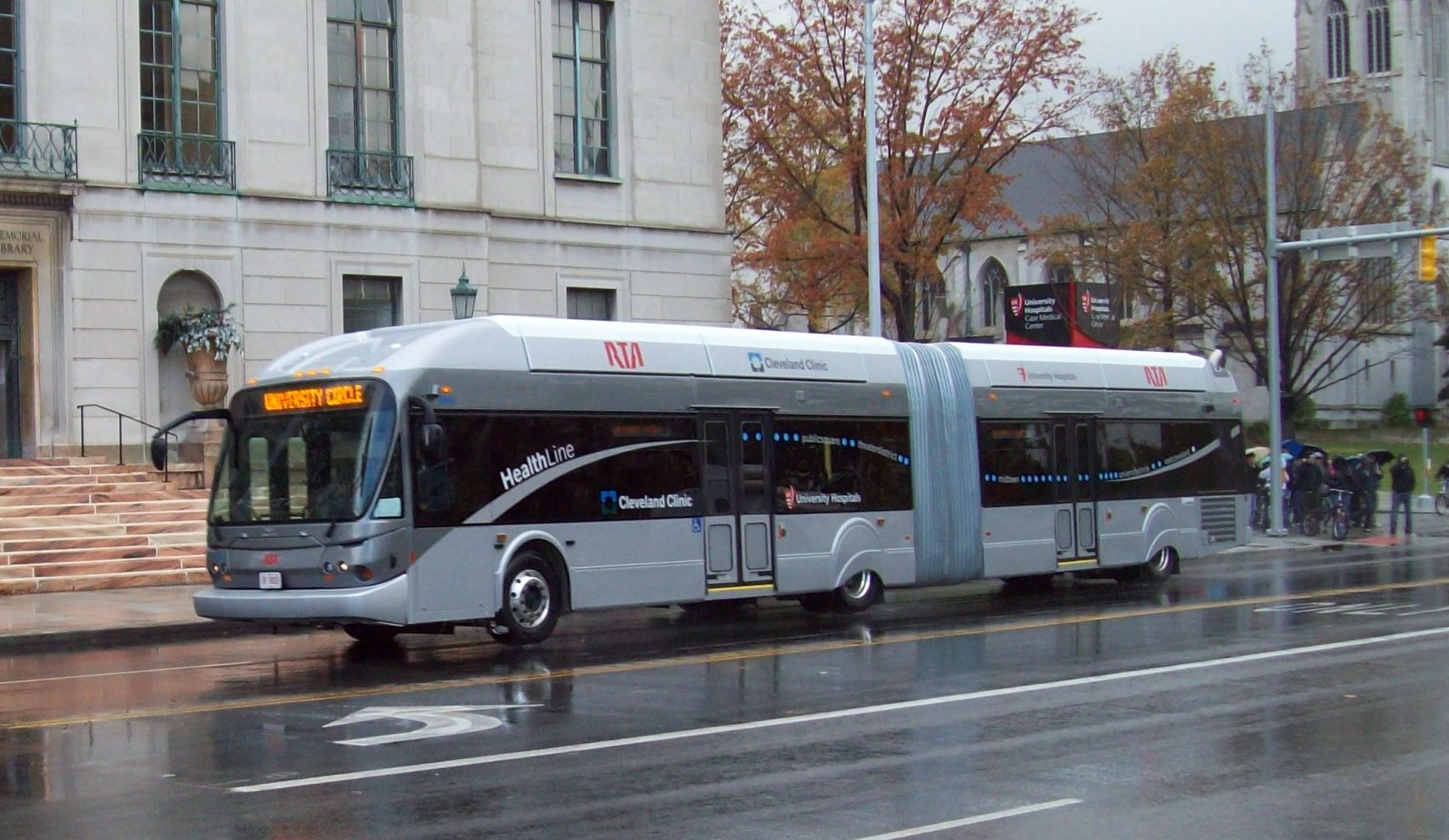
A HealthLine BRT vehicle drives through University Circle passing the Allen Memorial Medical Library.

University Circle is served by multiple forms of transportation, including rapid train, bus, bus rapid transit (BRT), and circulators. Unique from other Cleveland neighborhoods, it contains two train stops on the RTA's Red Line, the Little Italy-University Circle Station and the University Circle-Cedar Rapid Station. The CircleLink shuttle service (colloquially known as the "Greenie") provides free public transportation within University Circle. It provides service between the north and south sides of the CWRU campus, from University Circle to Coventry Village, around the CWRU campus and University Hospitals Cleveland Medical Center], and between the Urban Child Research Center and the main Case campus. The new BRT HealthLine, which opened on October 24, 2008, is the newest option to the neighborhood, being a major destination on the line along Euclid Avenue that connects Public Square to Louis Stokes Station at Windermere in East Cleveland. In a $197 million project, Euclid Avenue was rebuilt during construction, with the installation of public art, new lighting, and sidewalks along the entire length of the HealthLine, along with dedicated bus lanes. There are seven HealthLine stops in University Circle and runs 24 hours. Additionally, many bus routes have stops in University Circle, including bus numbers 7, 8, 9, 10, 32, 38, and 48/48A.

== Events ==
University Circle is known for its year-round cultural events:

- Hessler Street Fair (May)
- Parade the Circle (Jun)
- Summer Solstice Party (Cleveland Museum of Art) (Jun)
- International Folk Festival (Jun)
- WOW! Wade Oval Wednesdays (Jun-Aug)
- Feast of the Assumption (August 15 weekend)
- Showcase in the Circle and Home Tour (Sep)
- Cleveland's RIPE! Fest (Botanical Garden) (Sep)
- Little Italy Columbus Day Parade (Oct)
- Holiday CircleFest (Dec)

== Construction and expansion projects ==
University Circle is undergoing $2 billion in construction and renovation projects.

=== Uptown project ===
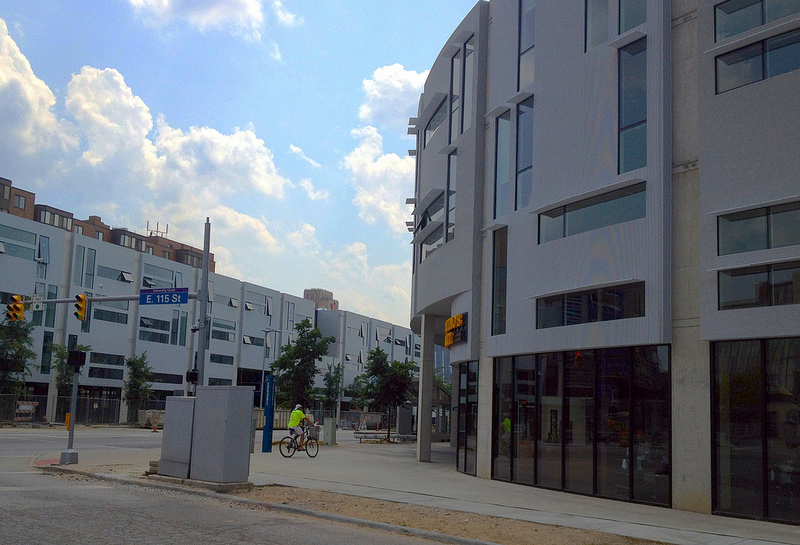
Apartments and Retail in the Uptown construction project

The Uptown project is a multi-phase, $150 million-plus retail, entertainment, restaurant and cultural project under development by MRN Ltd. of Cleveland, and sponsored by Case Western Reserve University and University Circle Inc. Its location creates a true center to University Circle.

A $44.5 million "Phase I" broke ground on August 2, 2010, creating two mixed-use buildings of 102 apartments above first floor retail.

Additional anchors of the project currently under construction include the $66 million expansion of the Cleveland Institute of Art and the $32 million new home for the Museum of Contemporary Art (MOCA). The new MOCA is designed by the London architect Farshid Moussavi. The surrounding pedestrian plaza is designed by James Corner Field Operations, the same landscape architecture firm who designed the High Line in New York City.

The $21 million "Phase II" consists of 43 apartments, dormitories for the Cleveland Institute of Art, and retail. The anchor tenant is a two-story bowling alley, known as Corner Alley. Completion date was in fall 2014. Euclid–East 120th (RTA Rapid Transit station) has been relocated to Mayfield Road at East 119th Street. With a total cost of $17.5 million, it was renamed the Little Italy-University Circle Rapid Station.

On November 30, 2011, the New York Times showcased the project with an article entitled "Cleveland Turns Uptown Into New Downtown".

=== Cleveland Museum of Art expansion ===
On March 7, 2005 the Cleveland Museum of Art embarked on a multi-year project to renovate and expand into the next century. The project is designed by architect Rafael Viñoly, combining old and new styles. At a total cost of $350 million, it is the largest cultural project in the history of the state of Ohio and one of the most comprehensive renovation and expansion projects in the museum field in the nation.

=== University Hospitals Cleveland Medical Center expansion ===
Three new facilities and structures opened in summer of 2011. They include the $250 million Seidman Cancer Center, $41 million Center for Emergency Medicine, and a $30 million new parking structure.

=== Train stations ===
Both current University Circle train stations were rehabbed and reconstructed by August 2015.

The University Circle-Cedar Rd rapid station underwent a complete rehab, using an ADA-compliant design to include a new rail entry plaza, waiting area, and train loading platform. A new bus terminal was also constructed on the north side of Cedar Road with a pedestrian connection between the bus terminal and the rail station. Secured funding included a $10.5 million grant from the U.S. Department of Transportation and a $2 million grant from the Federal Transit Administration—totaling $12.5 million in federal funds.

The Euclid–East 120th rapid station was relocated in conjunction with the Uptown Project to E.119 St and Mayfield Rd. Funding was received through a $12.5 million grant from the U.S. Department of Transportation, via the Federal Transit Administration. The final cost of the new station was around $17.5 million.

=== Louis Stokes VA Medical Center expansion ===
Totaling a $526 million expansion, this project includes a seven-story administrative office tower, living space for 122 homeless veterans, a 2,000-car parking garage, and a seven-story tower with 222 patient beds. Among the other parts of the project are the renovation of the hematology/oncology unit, expansion of the radiation area, building two floors on top of the atrium to accommodate various services, and an expanded operating room.

=== Case Western Reserve University expansion ===
Two major new construction projects have recently broken ground:

- Tinkham Veale Student Center
- Wyant Field House

In Spring 2012, Case Western Reserve University campus underwent the construction of $50 million student center in the center of campus. It is known as the Tinkham Veale Student Center designed by Ralph Johnson of Perkins + Will. It encompasses 82,000-square-feet, has 24/7 student access, and is environmentally friendly—with a green roof to absorb rainwater and windows designed to prevent excessive heat from sunlight. The second project is known as the Wyant Field House, enclosing the last open portion of DiSanto Field. The Wyant Field House is approximately 24,000 square feet and serves as a facility for varsity athletes and the 2,500 students who reside at The Village. The facility includes weight training and cardiovascular areas, a Varsity Club lounge, and multipurpose space.

== Little Italy ==
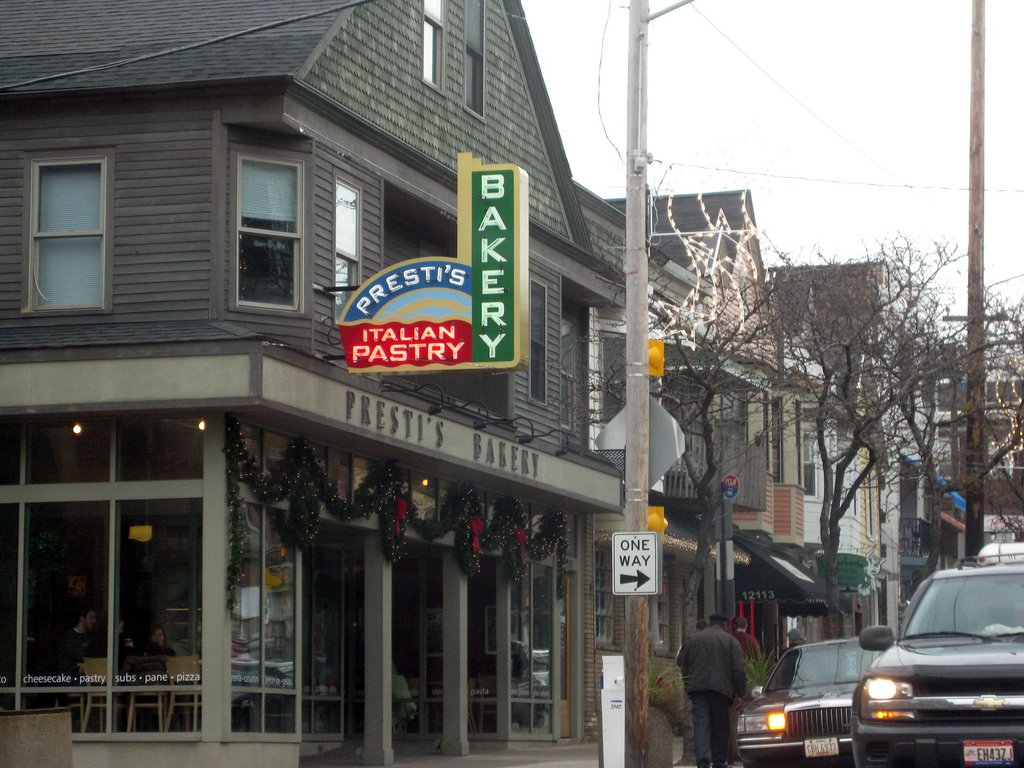
One of Little Italy's best known culinary landmarks, Presti's Bakery, sits at the corner of Mayfield and Coltman.

Little Italy (Italian: Piccola Italia) is an ethnic enclave that serves as the historic center of Cleveland's Italian American community. It is located from E. 119th to E. 125th streets on Murray Hill and Mayfield roads, situated at the eastern city limits, along a long, moderately sloping grade that ascends in elevation approximately 300 feet. It is bounded to the east and south by suburban Cleveland Heights, to the northeast by Lakeview Cemetery, and to the west by CSX, Norfolk Southern, and Greater Cleveland Regional Transit Authority Red Line railroad tracks, which separates it from the rest of University Circle.

=== Points and events of interest ===
Little Italy is known for its several culinary, historic, and cultural sites. Its biggest attractions are the restaurants, bakeries, and pizzerias. It is home to everything from a thriving art gallery, to scene boutique shops—and even a technology startup. The best-known historic structure is Holy Rosary Church built in 1908. Culturally, Little Italy is home to the Italian American Museum of Cleveland and the Alta House, the neighborhood community center founded in 1895. The private elementary and middle school is Montessori Elementary at Holy Rosary Church. Tony Brush Park provides the neighborhoods green space and playgrounds.

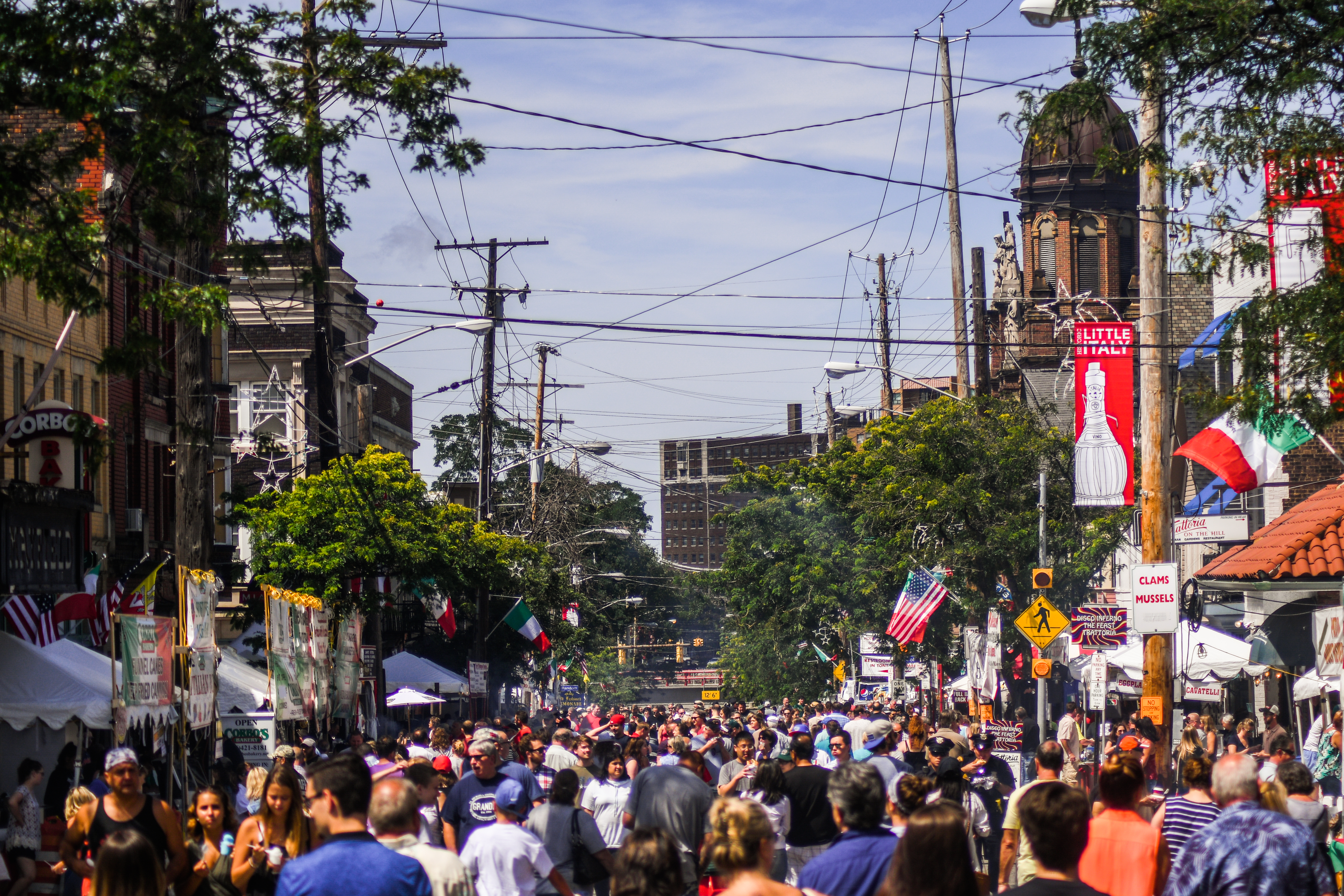
The annual highlight event of Little Italy in Cleveland is the Feast of the Assumption Festival.

Each August, the Roman Catholic congregation of the historic Holy Rosary Church celebrates the 4-day festival for the Feast of the Assumption, in which Little Italy stages Greater Cleveland's largest Italian-American street festival. Every October, Little Italy hosts the city's Columbus Day Parade. The neighborhood enjoys art walks a few times a year, usually in June, October, and December.

=== History ===
Little Italy began in 1895 when immigrant Joseph Carabelli saw the need for monument work in Cleveland's Lakeview Cemetery and established what soon became the city's leading marble and granite works. Local Cleveland industrial billionaire John D. Rockefeller took a special liking to the Italian immigrants of the neighborhood and commissioned the building of the community center Alta House, named after his daughter Alta Rockefeller Prentice, in 1900. Little Italy is also home to the first Italian restaurant to open in the State of Ohio, Guarino's, which is also the oldest restaurant in the city, opening in 1918. The first hand-crank pasta machine was invented in Little Italy by Angelo Vitantonio, an Italian immigrant to Cleveland. He received a patent for the product in 1906, and went on to found the Italian kitchenware manufacturer VillaWare, which continues to operate today.

In 1911, it was estimated that 96% of the inhabitants were Italian-born, and another 2% were of Italian parents; immigrants primarily came from Abruzzo, Molise, and Sicily. Ettore Boiardi (Chef Boyardee) opened his first restaurant, Il Giardino d'Italia, in the 1920s. As the nearby neighborhoods of Glenville and Hough became increasingly African American by the 1950s, Little Italy experienced racial tensions which were especially on display in 1964 when Murray Hill School was integrated, and during the 1966 Hough riots. In 1993, the community dedicated Tony Brush Park, named for champion boxer and Little Italy resident Anthony Brescia, at Mayfield and Random roads. Major residential project expansions occurred in 2003 with the 20-unit Villa Carabelli, in 2005 with the 15-unit Random Road Lofts townhomes, and in 2011 the 27-unit 27 Coltman townhouses.

The neighborhood bocce courts are located at the Alta House, and in 2011 underwent a complete remodeling in a $110,000 project, being named in honor of Nick and Dorothy Lucarelli. The Alta House runs bocce leagues Monday through Thursday from May to October every year. Annually, the Alta House hosts some of the largest bocce tournaments in the Midwest, including the memorial John Anthony Cipullo Bocce Tournament which started in 1992 and occurs every July.

For a large part of its history, Cleveland was home to the largest Mafia organization between New York and Chicago. The Mayfield Road Mob was the name of a gang which began around 1920 in Little Italy. Among the members of the "Mayfield Road Mob" were James T. Licavoli and Jimmy Fratianno. This Mafia faction was even mentioned by its old name in the movie "The Godfather" as the Lakeview Road Gang, as Lakeview Cemetery borders Mayfield Road Hill.

== Gallery ==
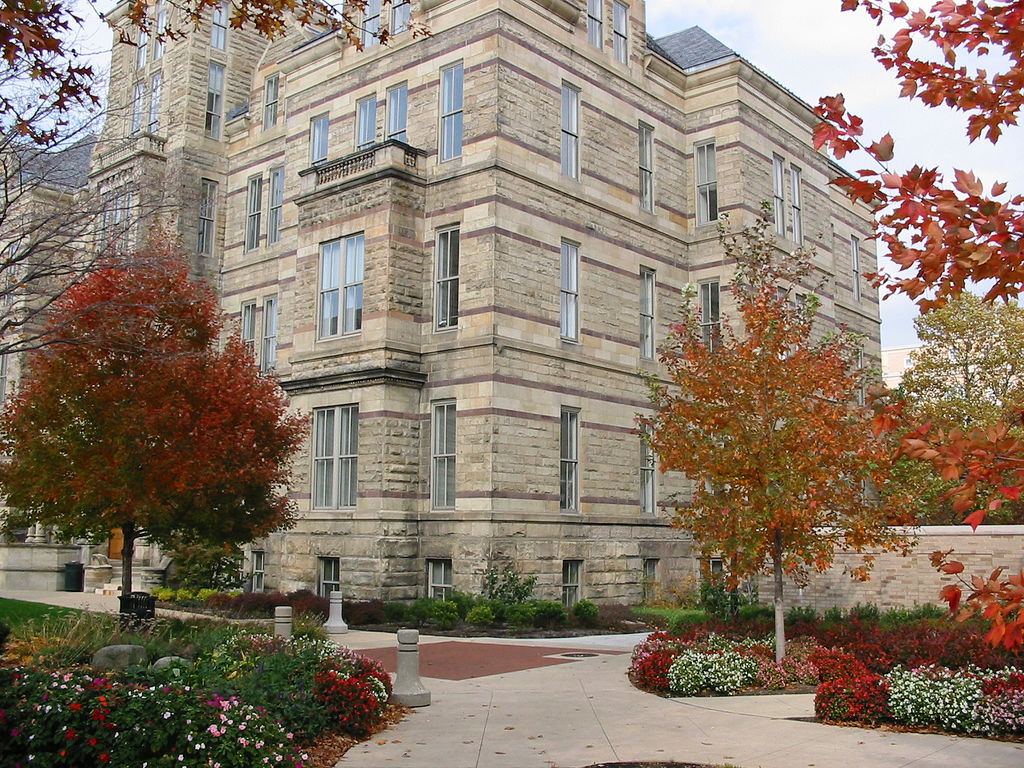
Adelbert Hall at Case Western Reserve University

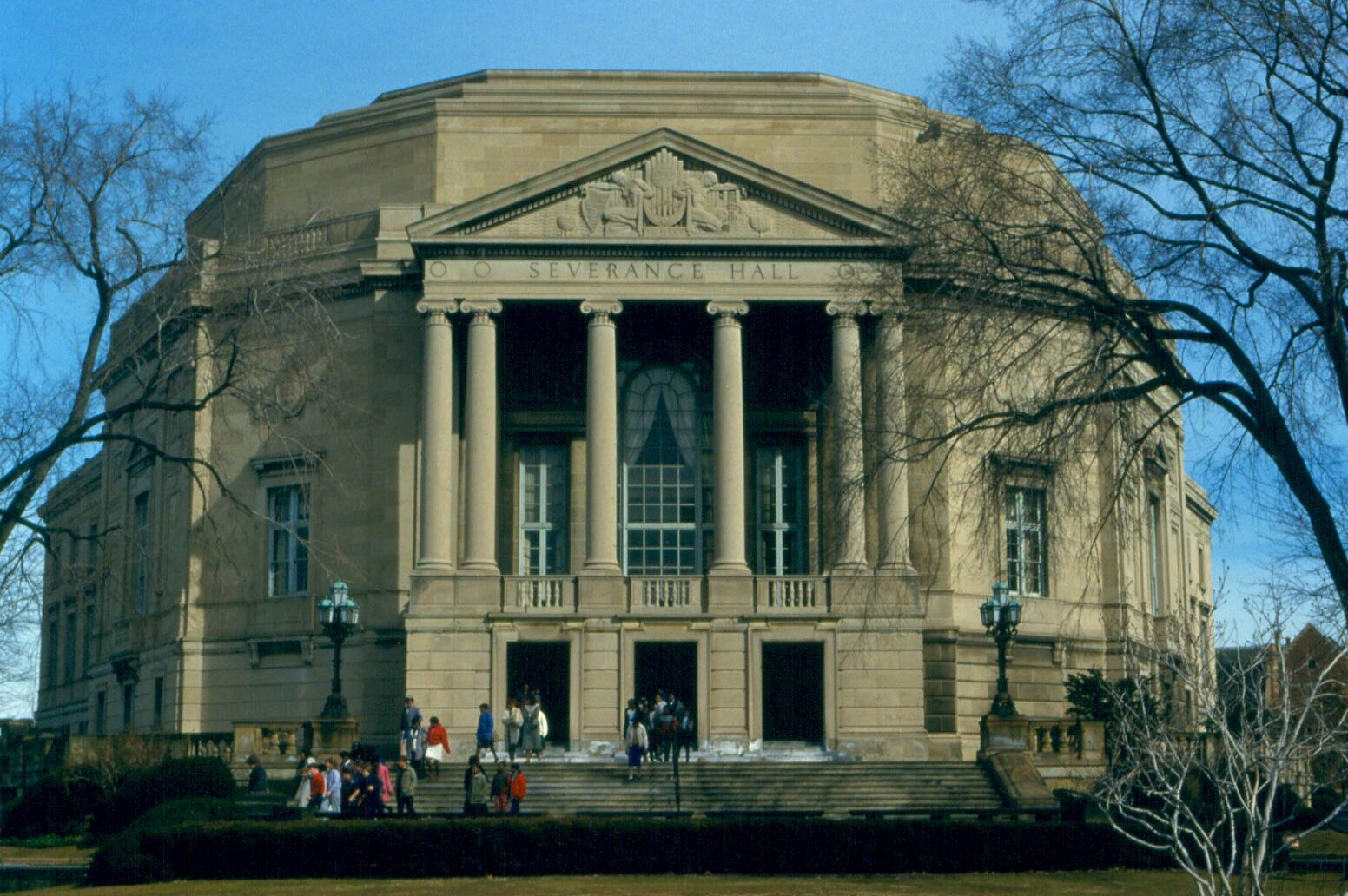
Severance Hall, home to the Cleveland Orchestra

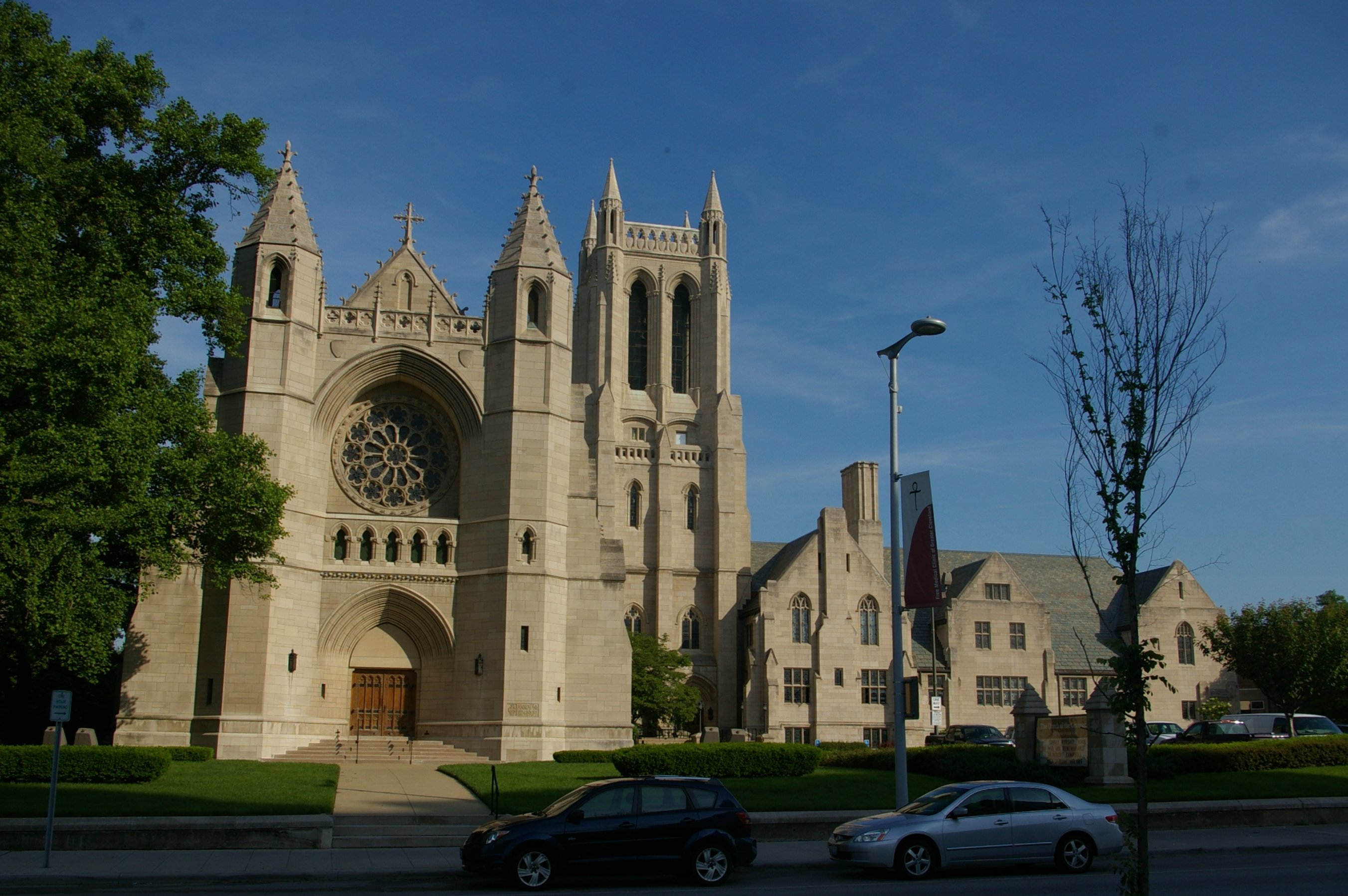
Church of the Covenant

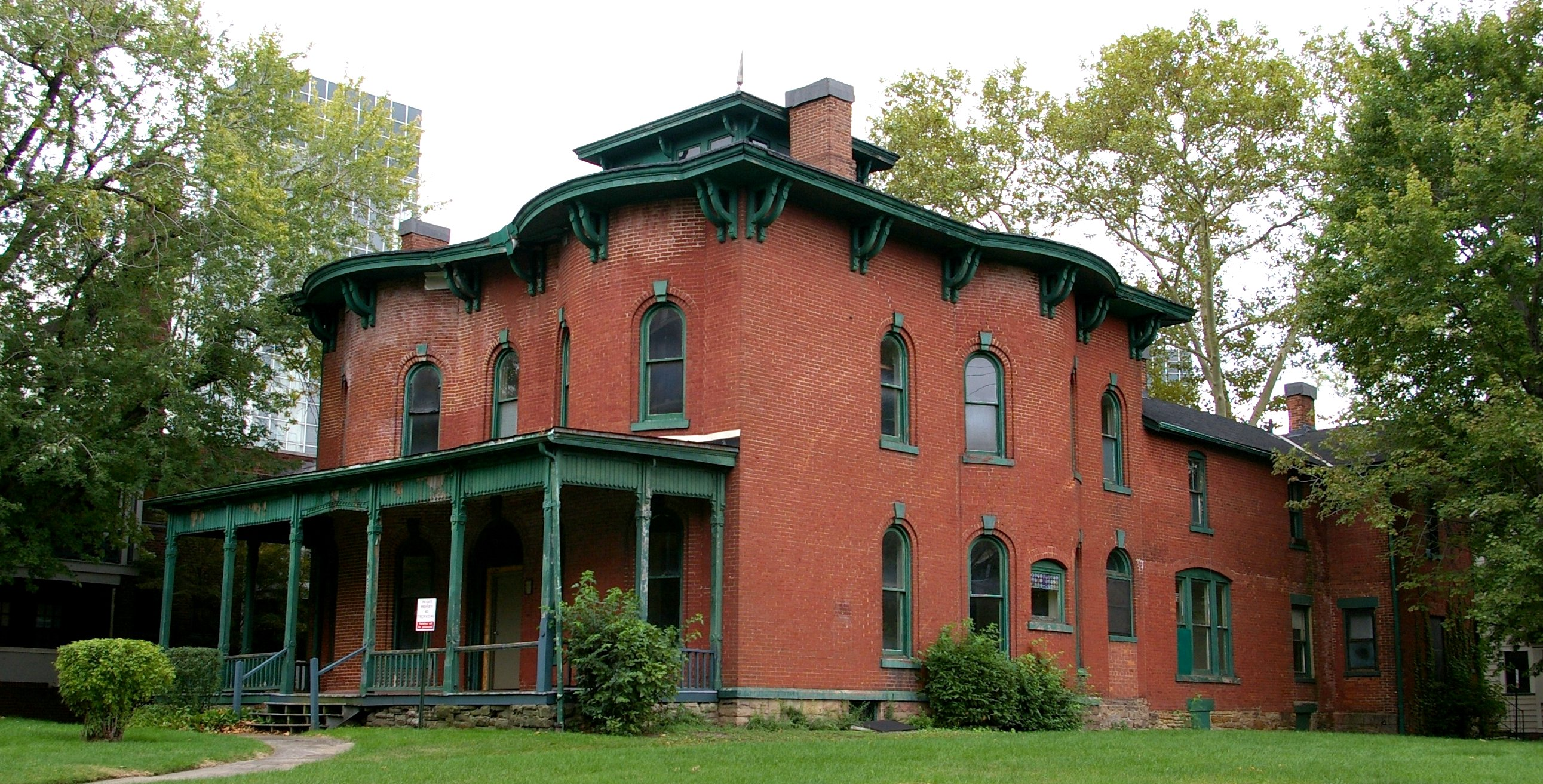
Cozad-Bates House built 1853

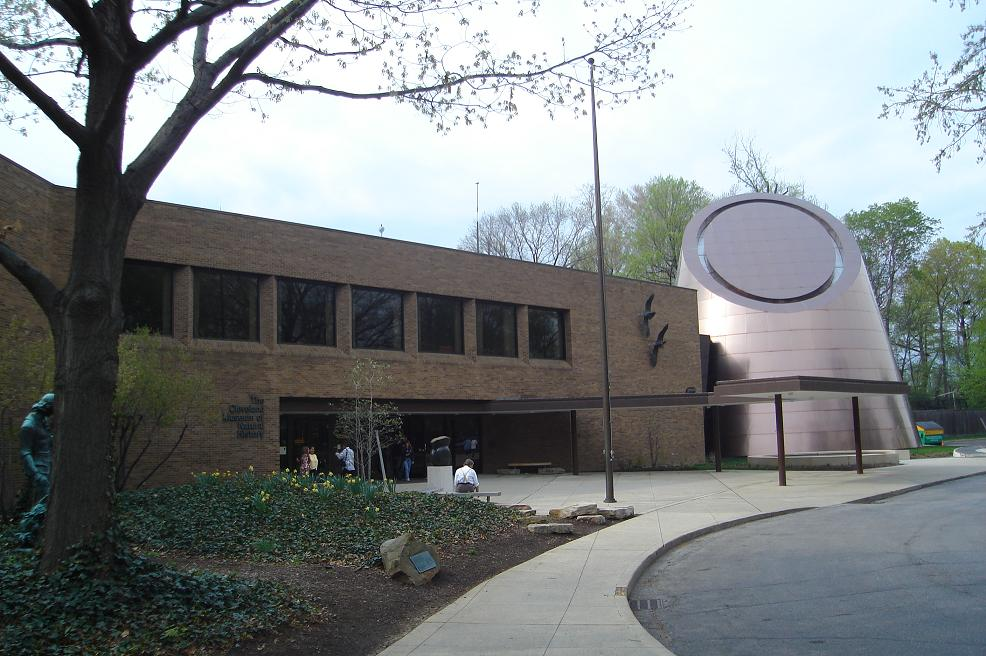
Main entrance to the Cleveland Museum of Natural History

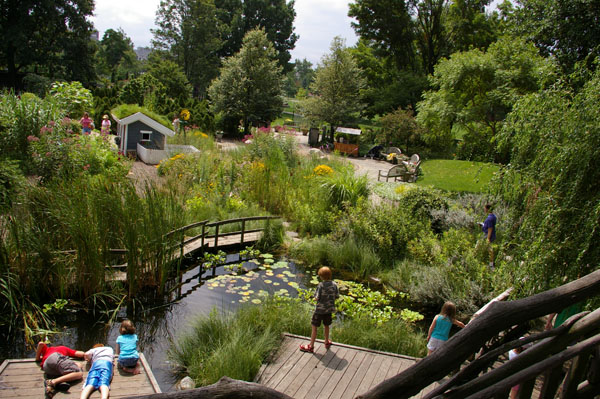
Hershey Children's Garden at the Cleveland Botanical Garden

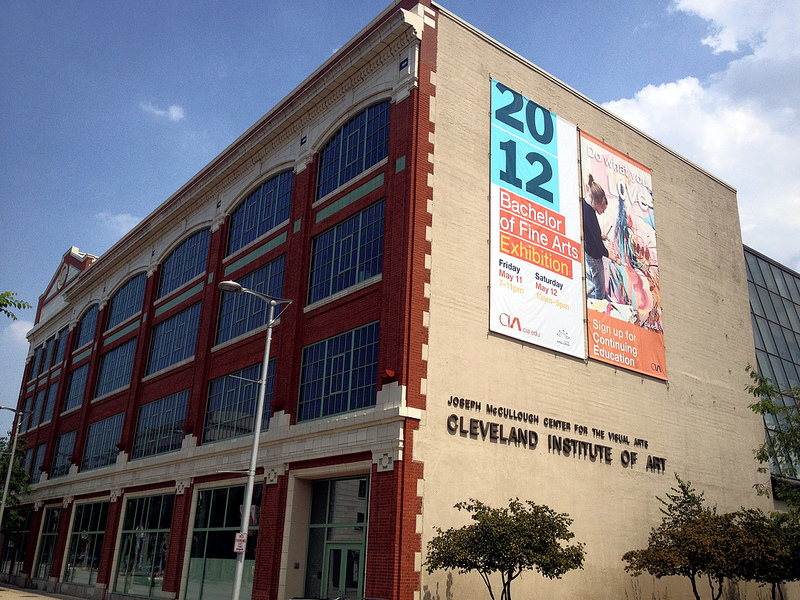
The Cleveland Institute of Art is centered in a former Ford Model T factory

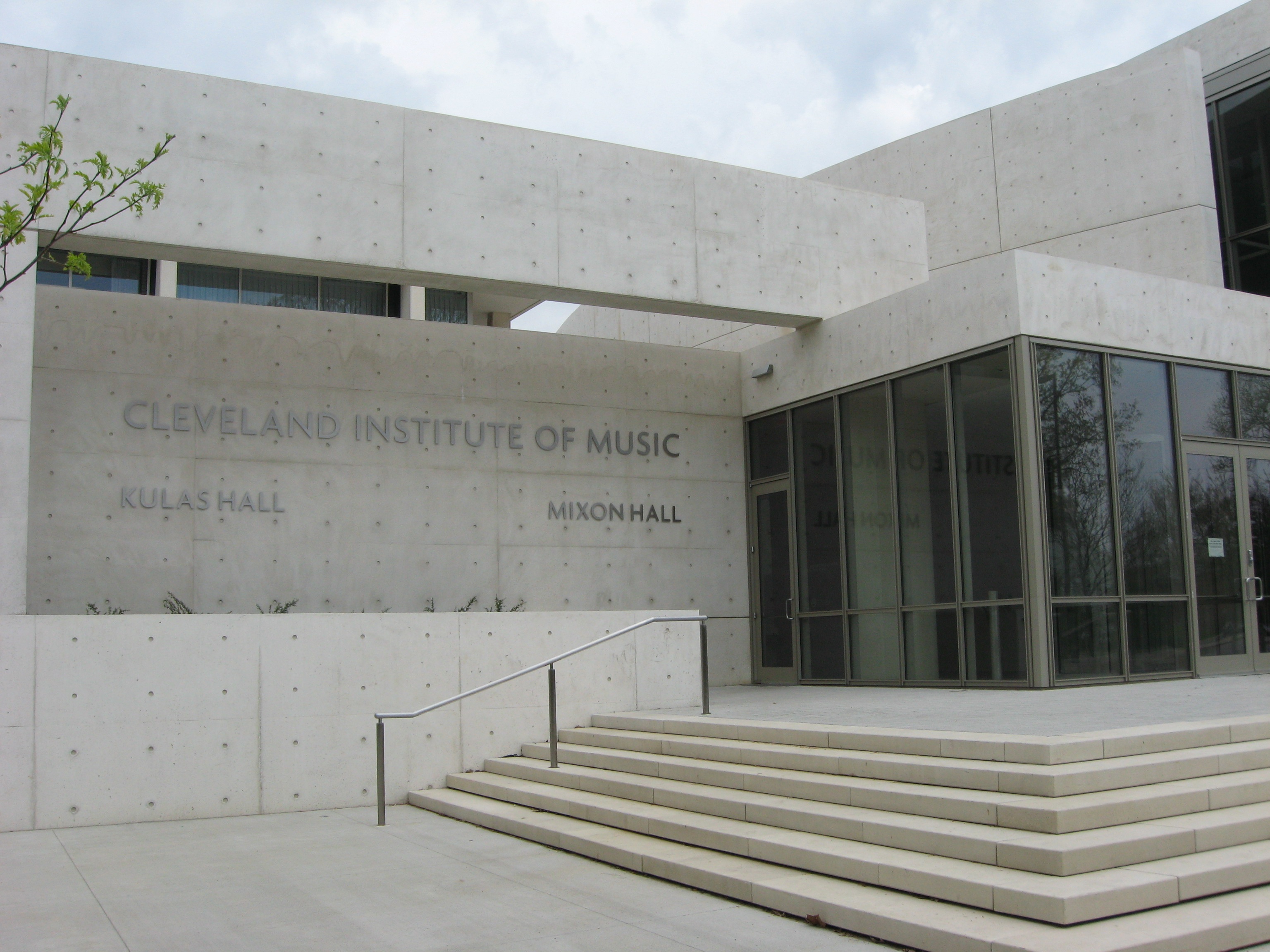
The Cleveland Institute of Music

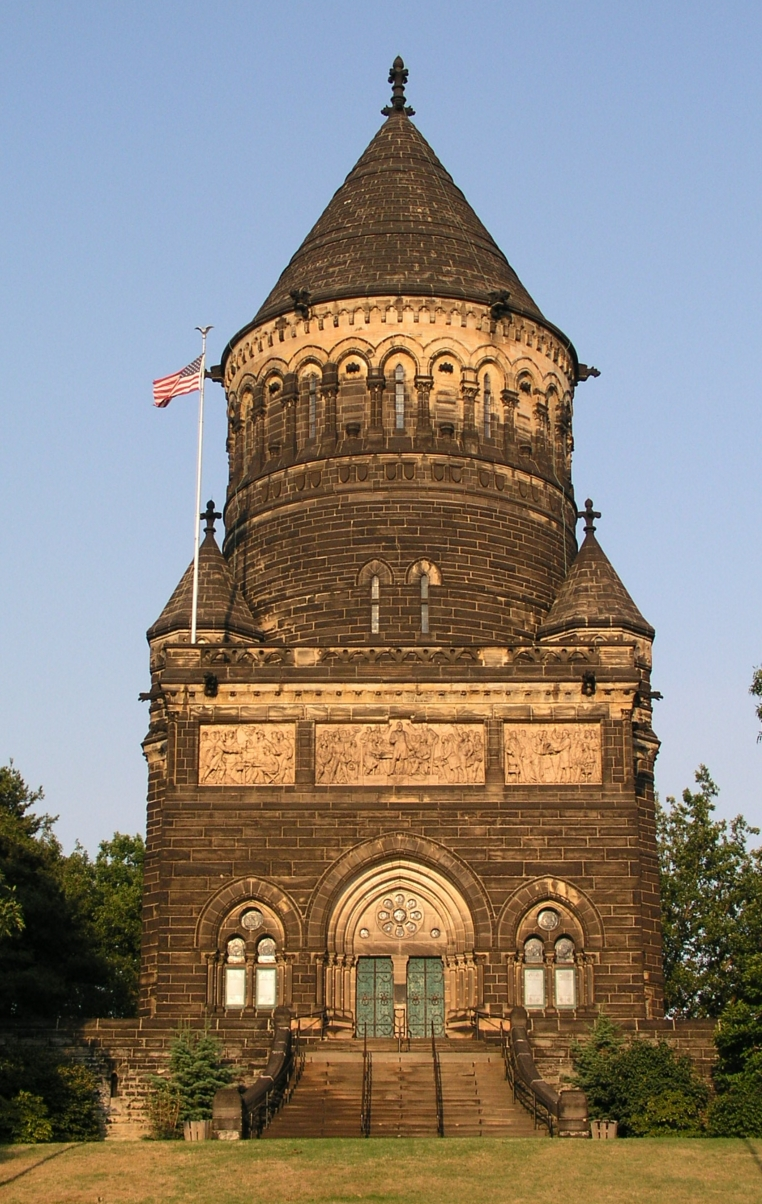
The James A. Garfield Memorial in Lakeview Cemetery is on the National Register of Historic Places.

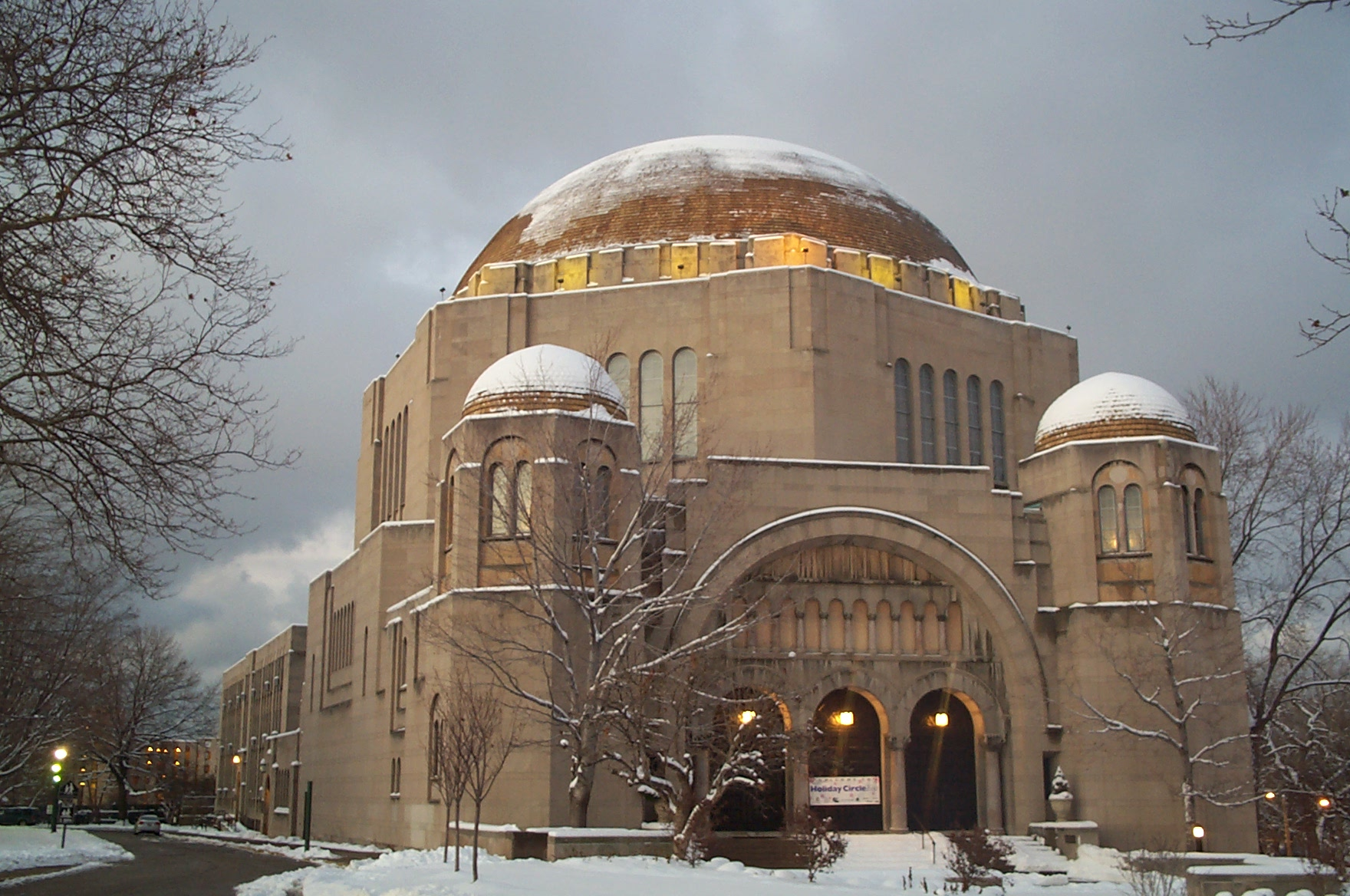
Maltz Performing Arts Center, converted synagogue operated by Case Western Reserve University

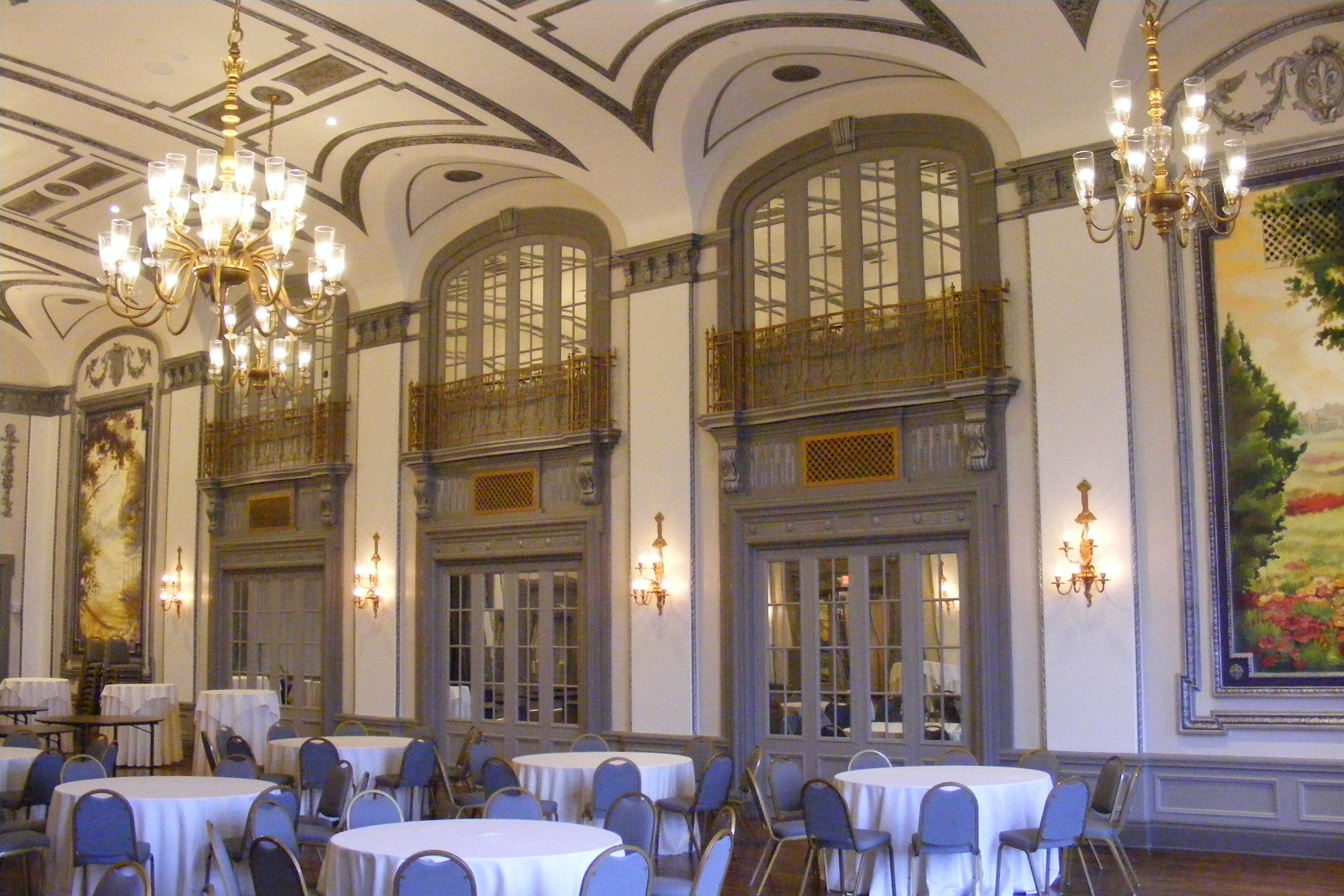
Ballroom of the Tudor Arms Doubletree Hotel renovated in 2011

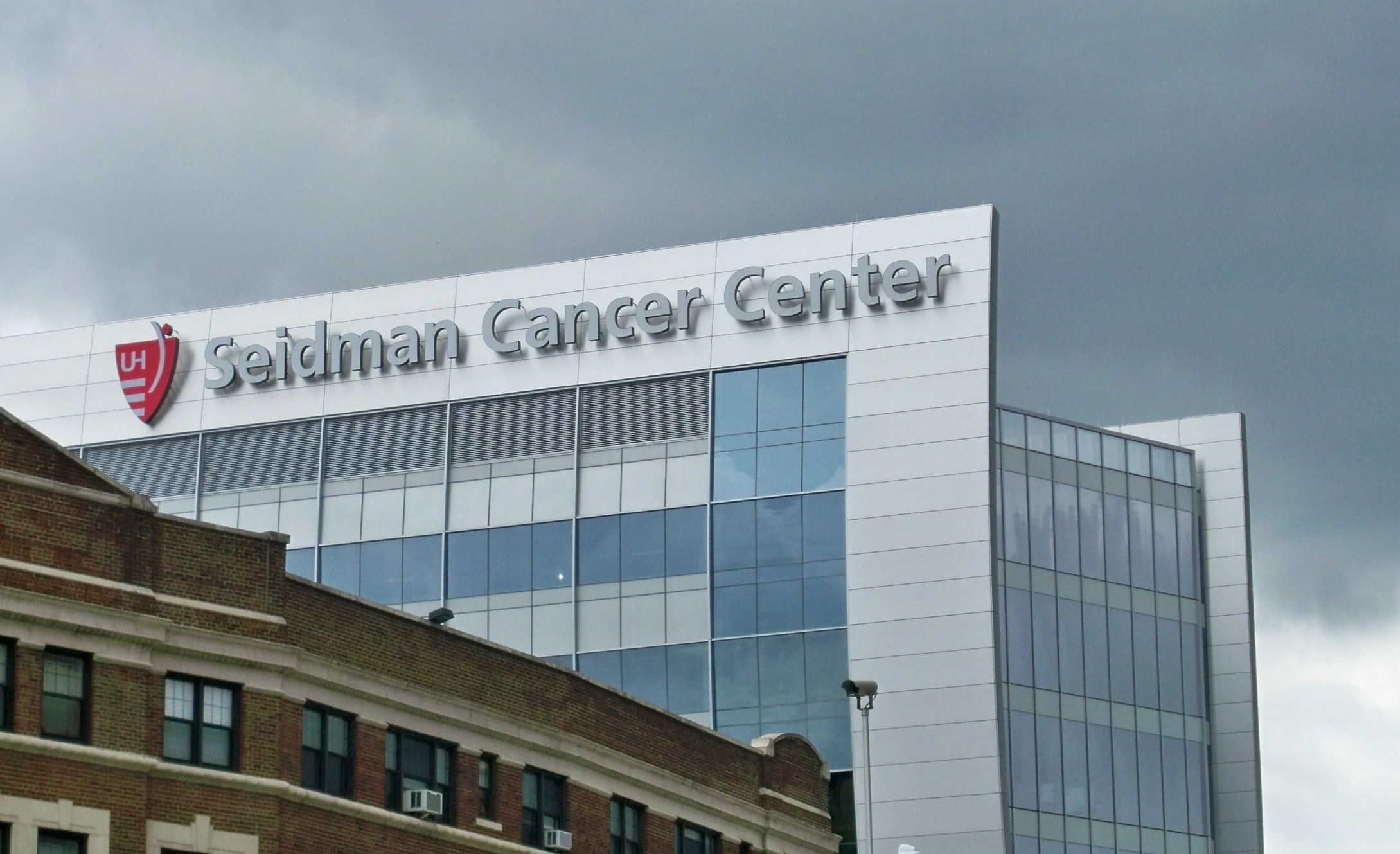
University Hospitals Cleveland Medical Center Seidman Cancer Center behind a mixed-use apartment building

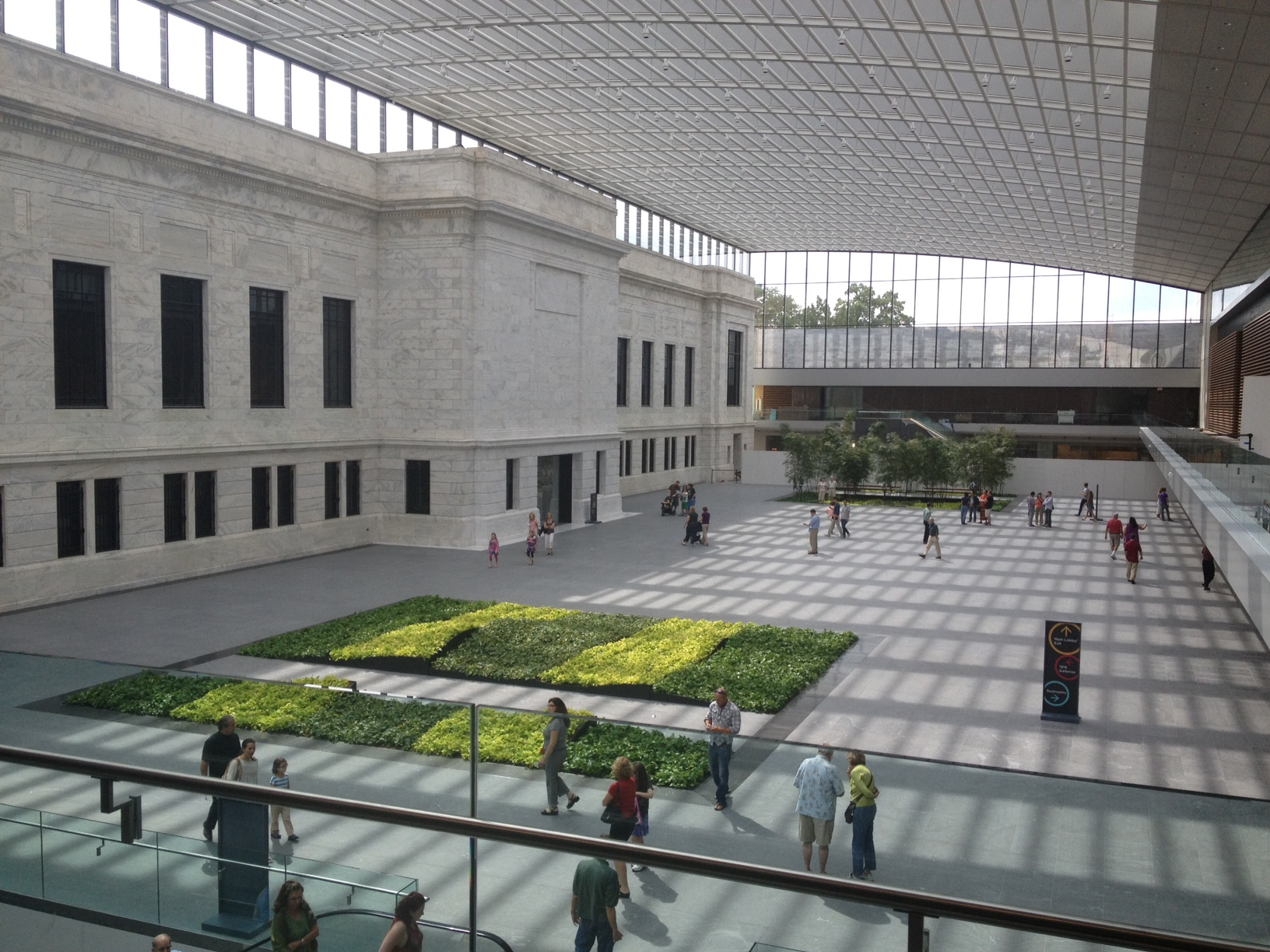
Inside the atrium of the Cleveland Museum of Art

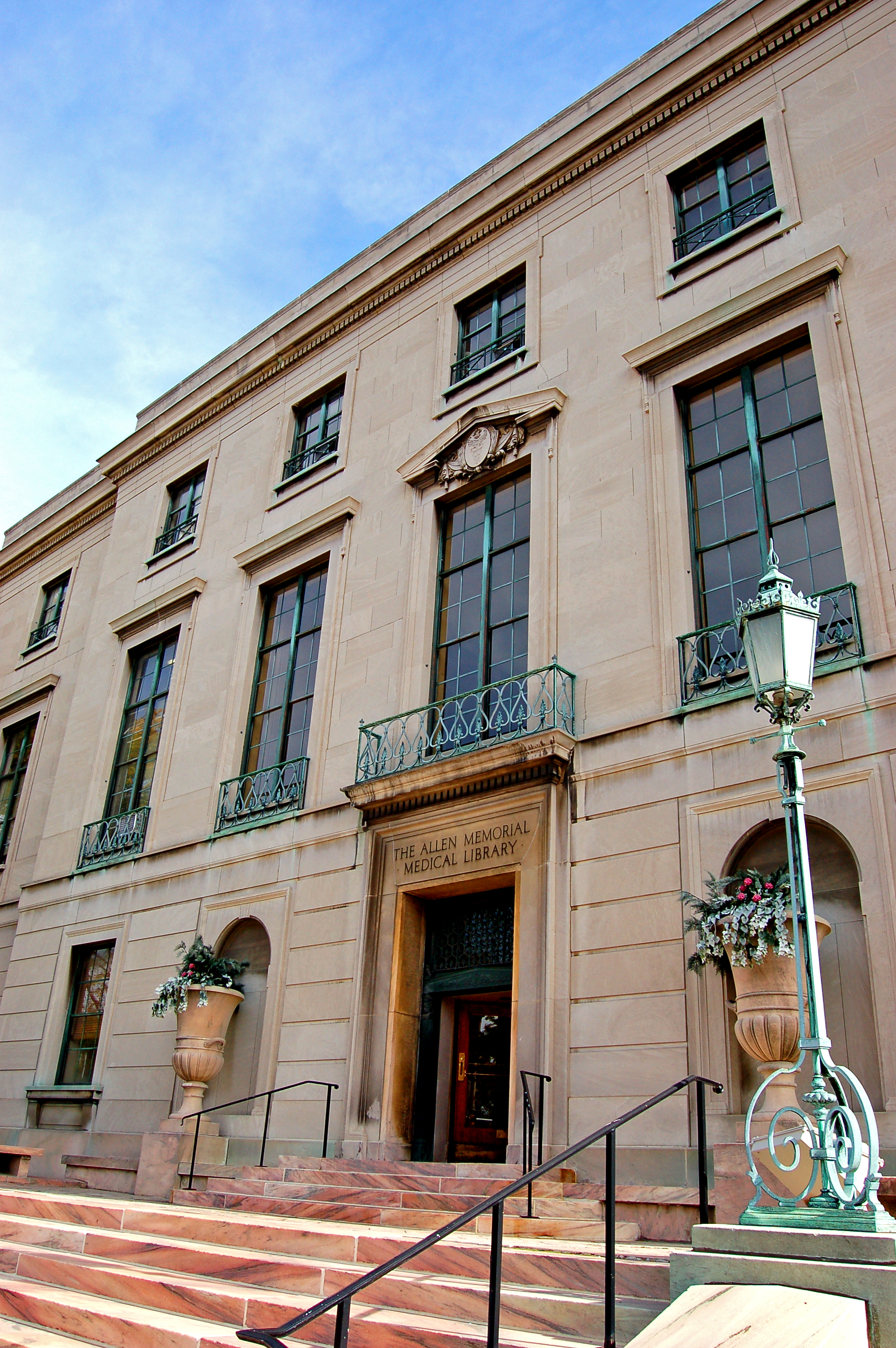
Allen Memorial Medical Library, home to the Dittrick Museum of Medical History

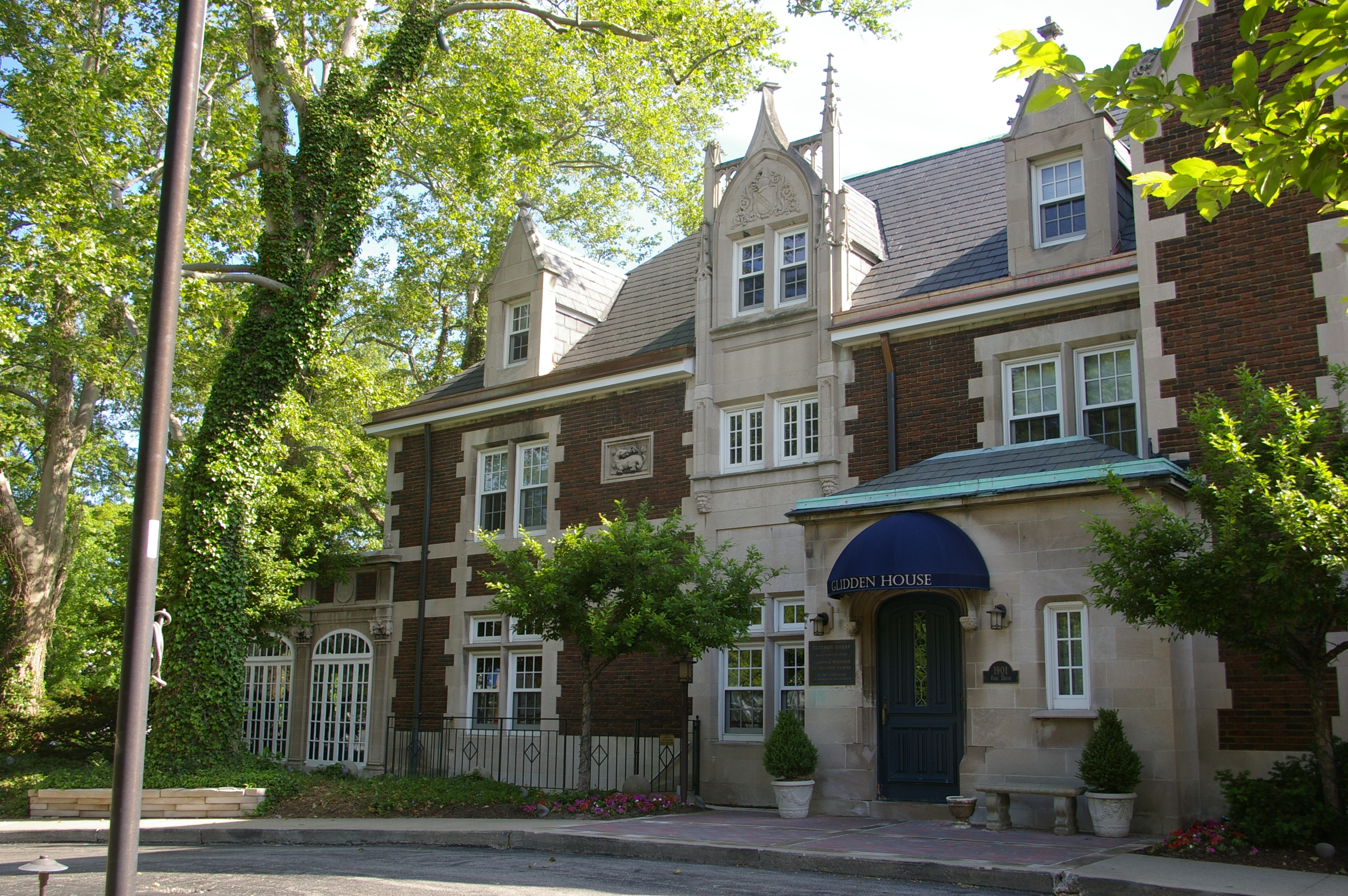
Glidden House boutique hotel located at the Juniper Rd and Ford Rd intersection

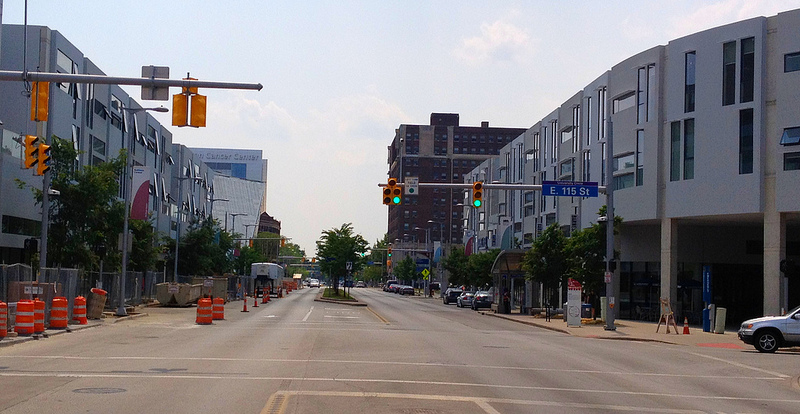
Streetscape of Euclid Ave at E.115 showing Uptown

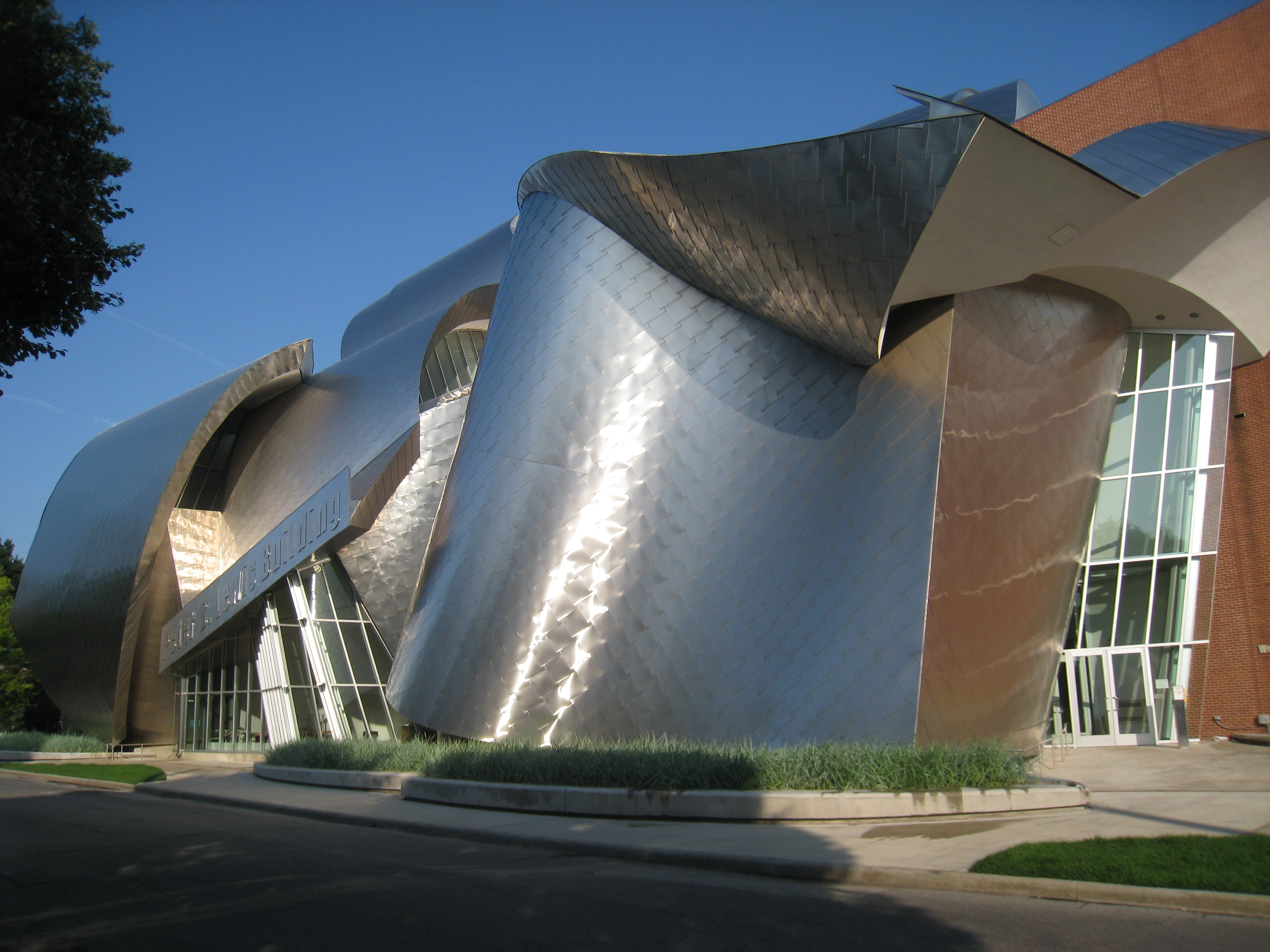
Frank Gehry designed Peter B Lewis Building serves as the Weatherhead School of Management.

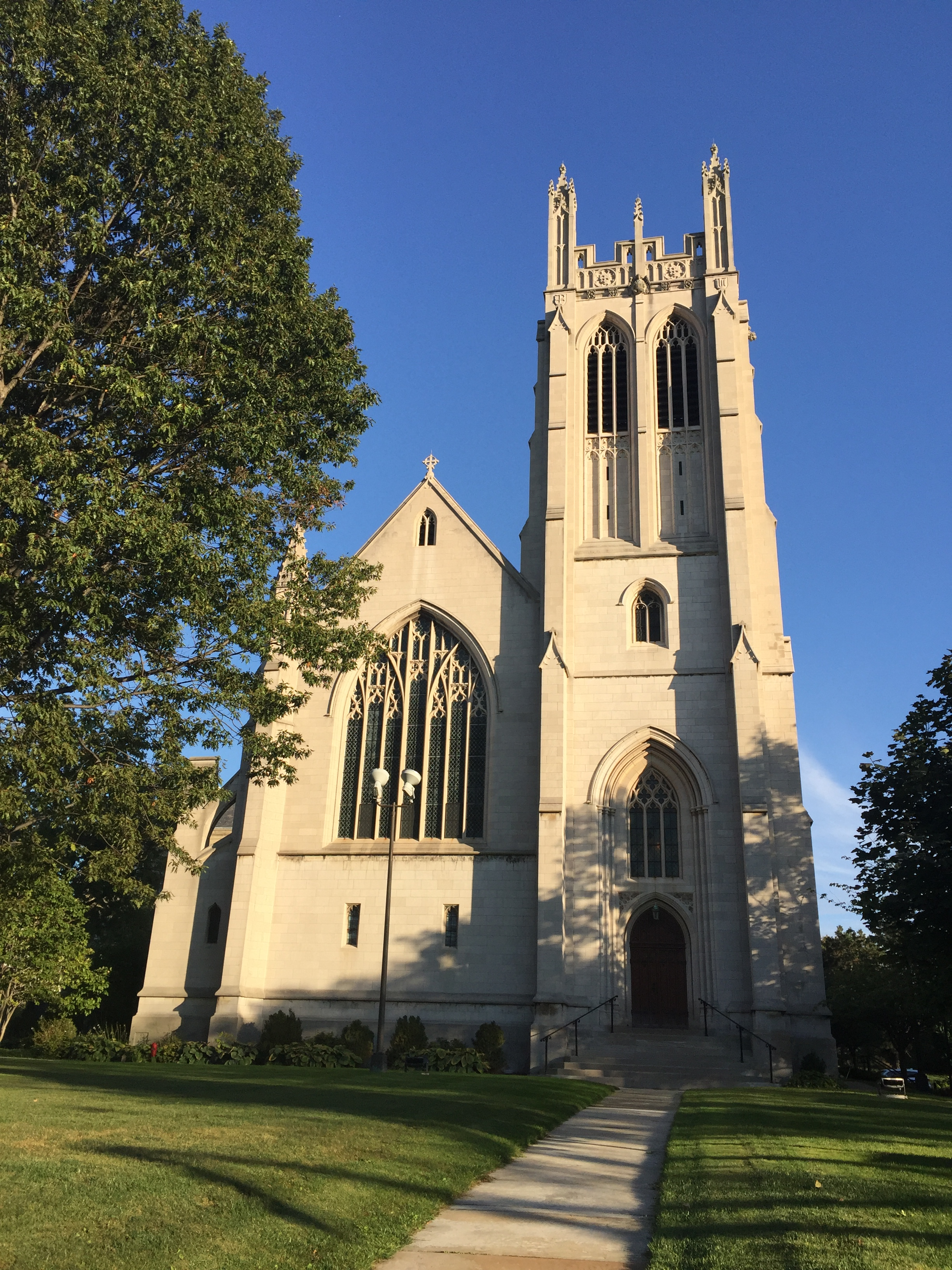
Amasa Stone Chapel

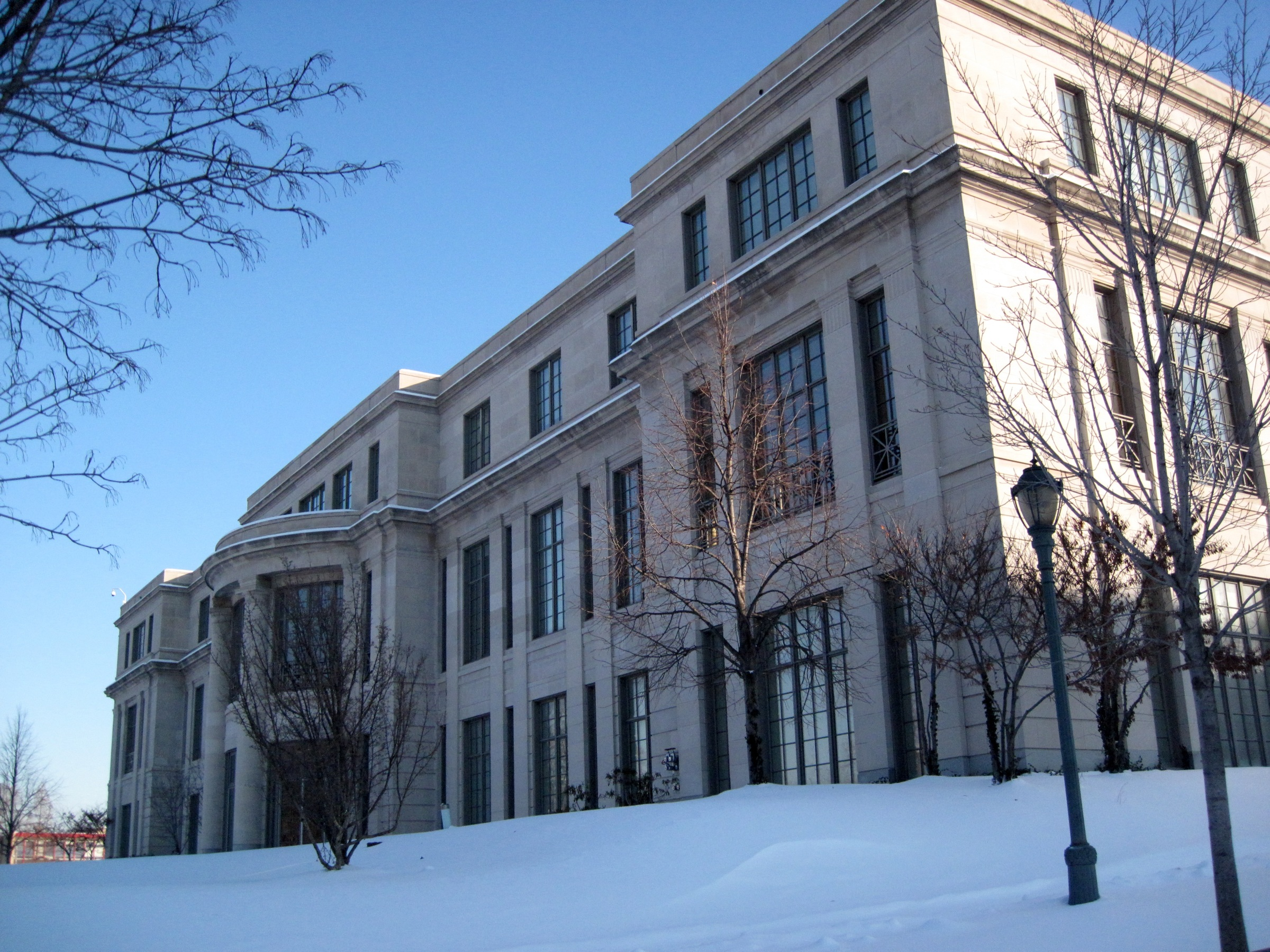
Kelvin Smith Library

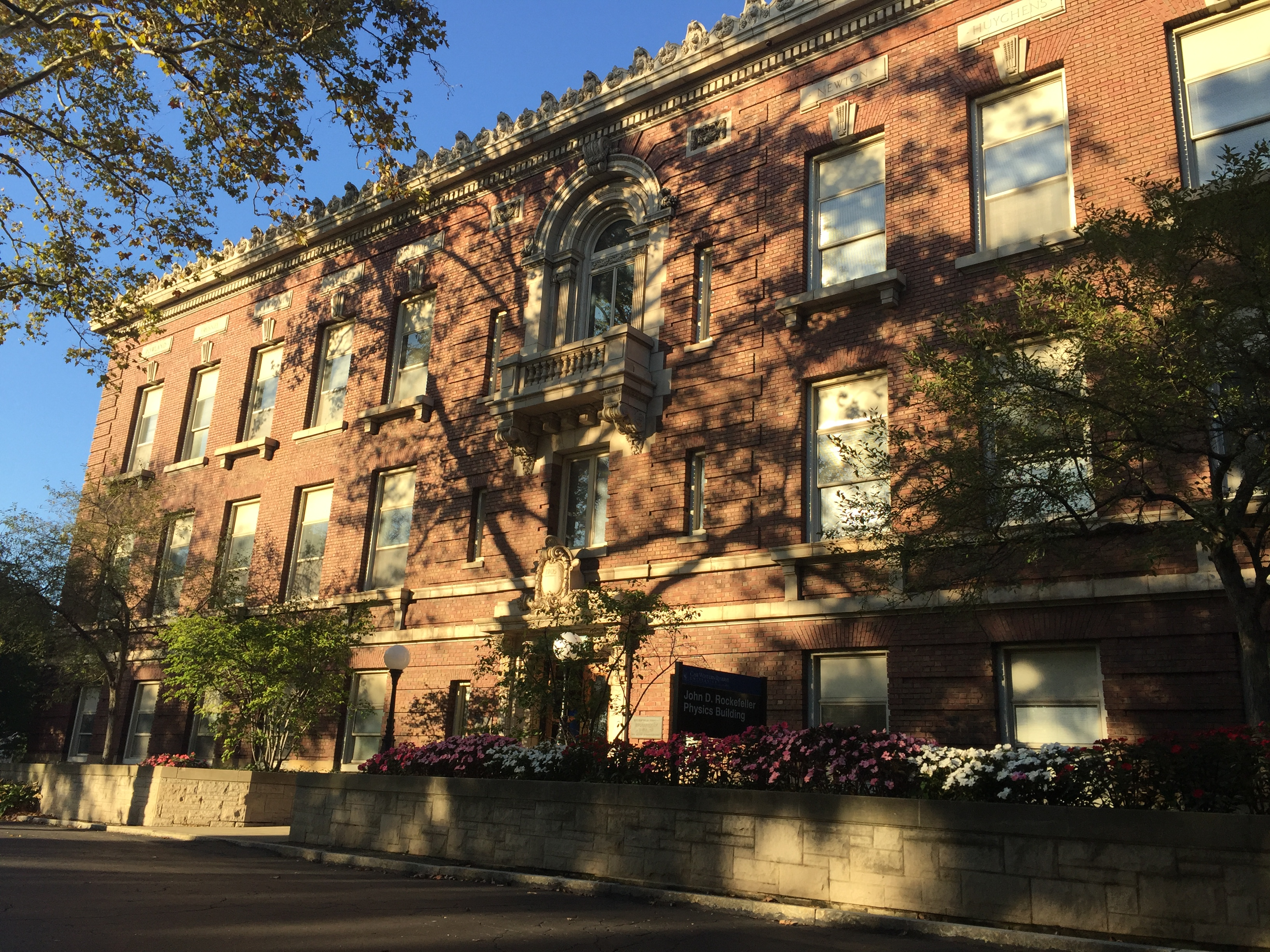
John D. Rockefeller Physics Building

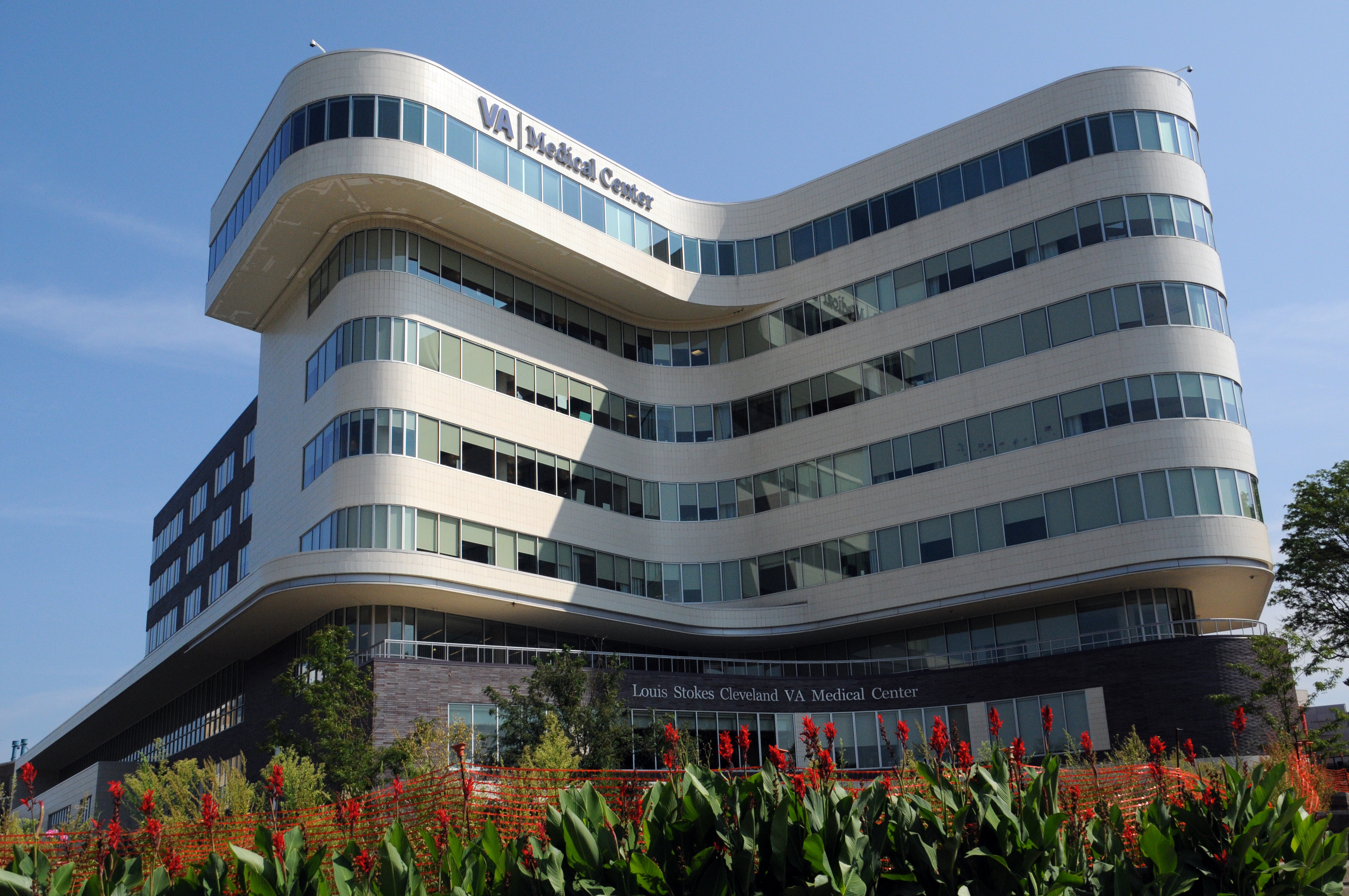
Louis Stokes Cleveland VA Medical Center

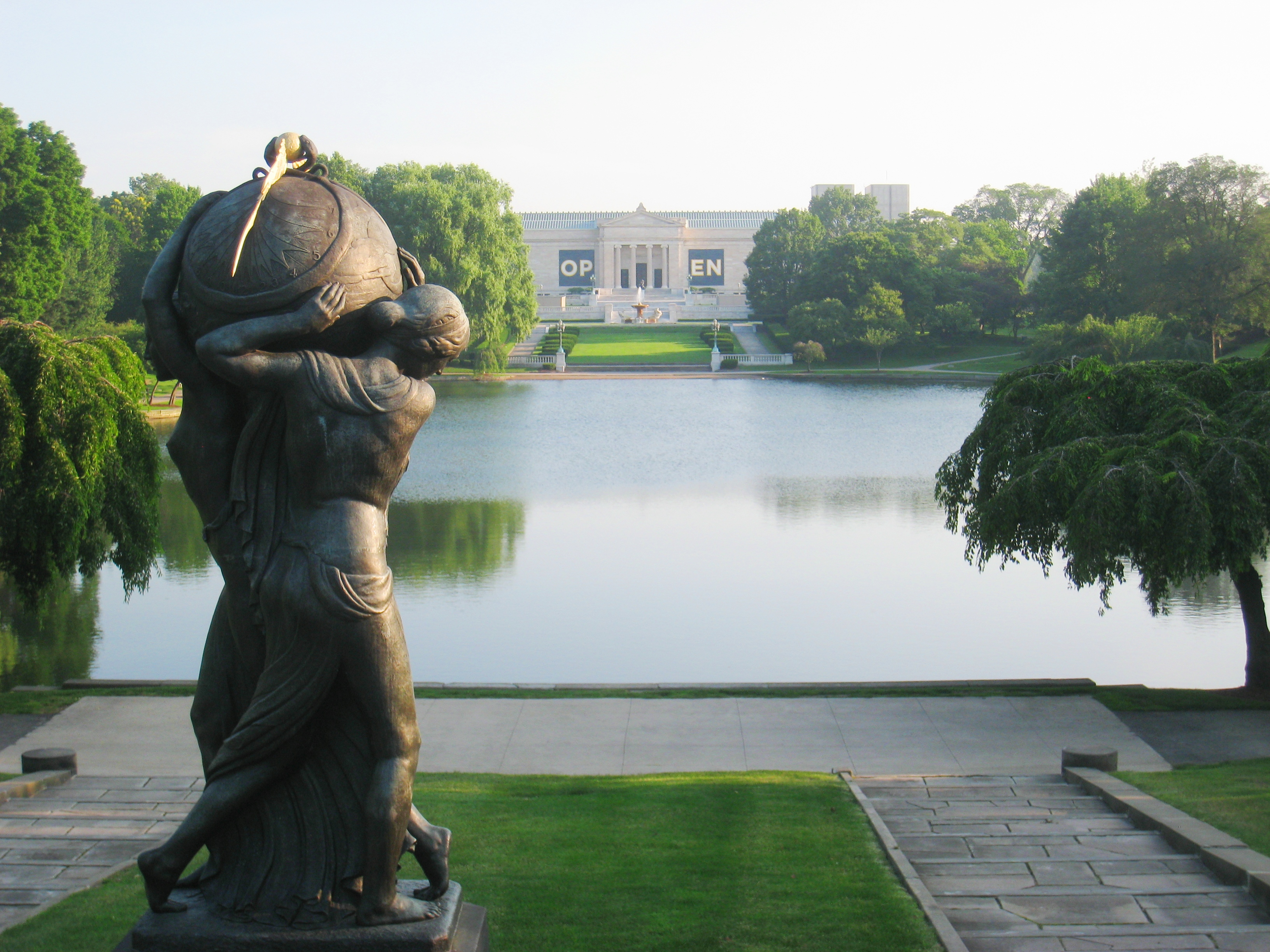
Wade Lagoon stretches in front of the Cleveland Museum of Art

== See also ==
- List of Italian-American neighborhoods
