= Michelson-Morley Memorial Fountain =

Coordinates: 41.50383°N 81.60875°W

Michelson-Morley Memorial Fountain, also known as the Michelson-Morley Monument and commonly called the "lipstick fountain," is located on the campus of Case Western Reserve University in the University Circle neighborhood of Cleveland, Ohio. It was designed by William Behnke and built in 1973 in commemoration of the world-famous Michelson–Morley experiment.

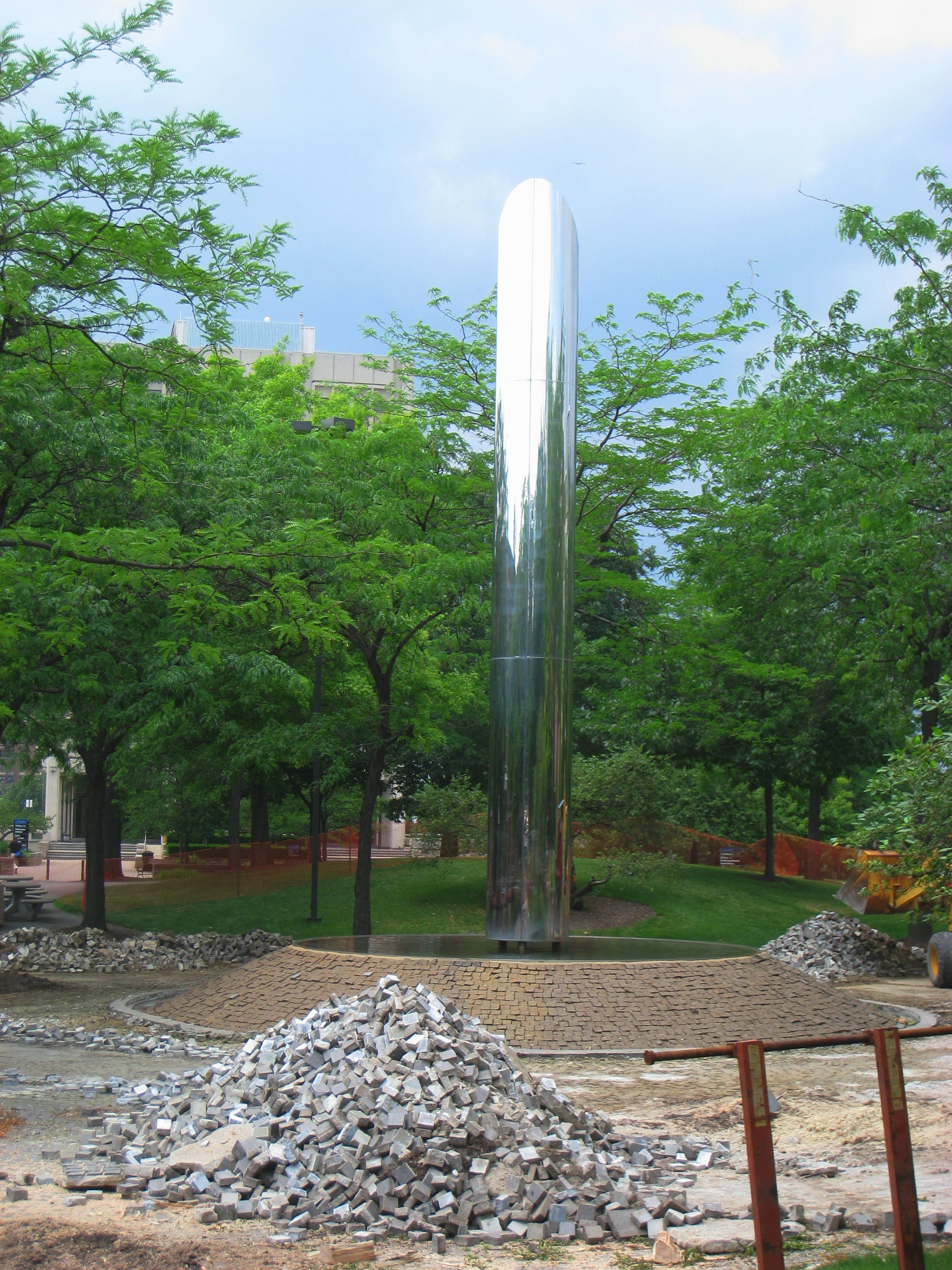
Michelson-Morley Memorial Fountain in Cleveland, Ohio

== Fountain ==
=== Description ===
The sculpture is a chrome-plated steel cylinder with the top cut at a 45-degree angle. Cylinder is formed of 12 curved plates. The open top is cut at a 45-degree angle and the inside of the opening is painted black. The cylinder is supported above the water level of the small pool located underneath. The base housing the pool slopes from a 15 ft circle into a 25 ft (diameter) circle made from brickwork/paving stones. The overall setting is a paving stone surfaced plaza with benches and a circle of locust trees set 15 ft away, surrounding the fountain.

=== Meaning ===
The undulating water symbolizes ether waves; the steel cylinder represents the ascending beam of light.

== Experiment ==
The Michelson–Morley experiment was conducted in 1887 by physicist Albert A. Michelson of Case School of Applied Science and chemist Edward W. Morley of Western Reserve University. This experiment proved the non-existence of the luminiferous ether and was later cited as circumstantial evidence in support of special relativity as proposed by Albert Einstein in 1905. Michelson became the first American to win a Nobel Prize in science.
