= Cleveland Feast of the Assumption Festival =

Annual festival in Cleveland, Ohio, US

Coordinates: 41°30′32″N 81°35′56″W

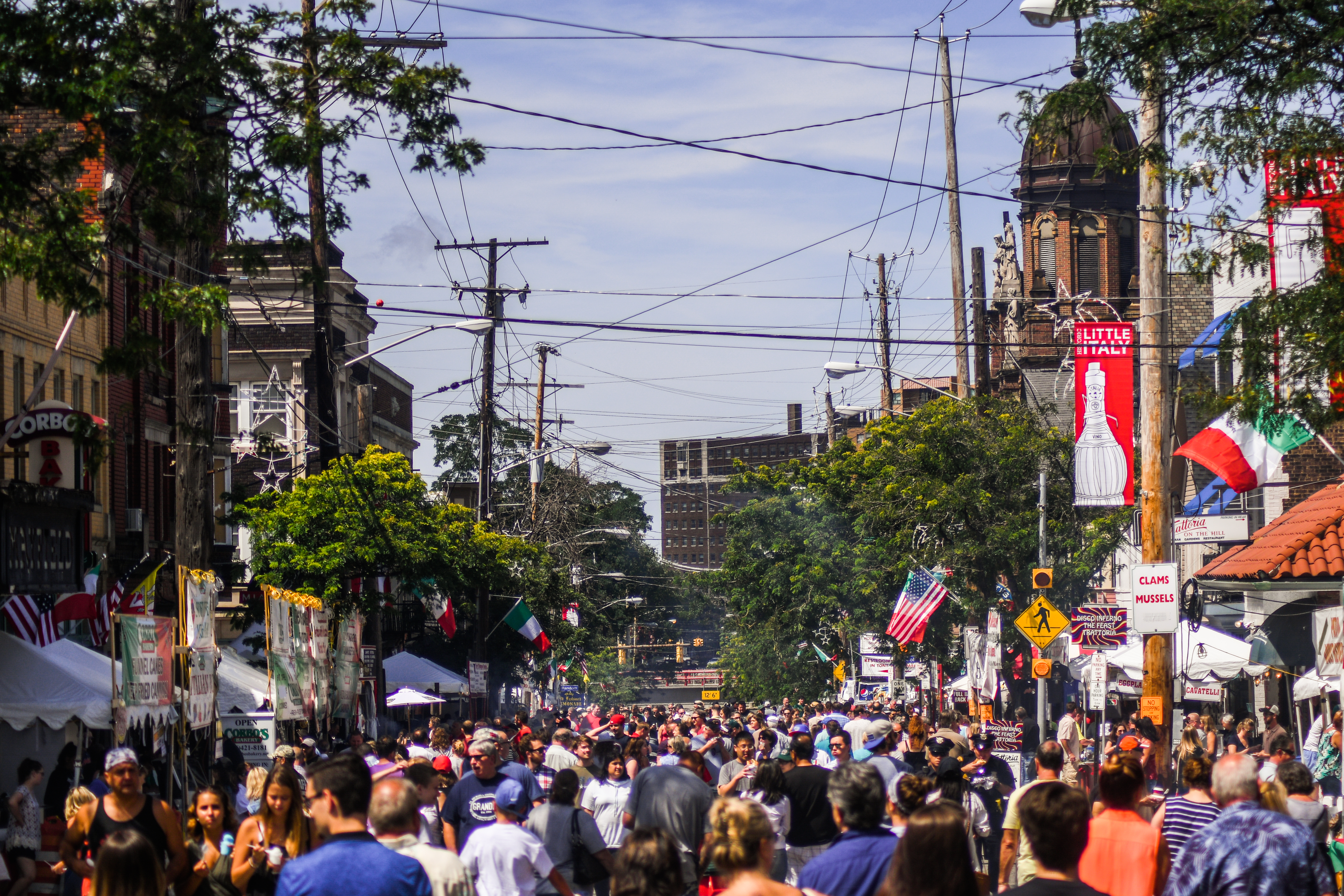
A view of the feast looking west, down Mayfield Road, toward Holy Rosary Church. The annual Feast of the Assumption attracts many people, especially Italian Americans, to Cleveland's Little Italy.

The Feast of the Assumption Festival (Italian: Festa dell'assunzione; also locally referred to informally as The Feast (La festa)) is an annual four-day Catholic and Italian American street festival in the Little Italy neighborhood of Cleveland, Ohio, centered on Holy Rosary Church on Mayfield Road near its intersection with Murray Hill Road.

== History and traditions ==
Held annually since 1898 (with exceptions in 1917–18, 1942–45 and 2020), the Feast occurs around August 15 in concordance with the observance of the Assumption of Mary. It includes a procession of a statue of the Virgin through the streets leading to the church, as well as a nightly mass. In addition to its religious nature, the Feast is also a general celebration of Cleveland's Italian cultural heritage in its largest Italian neighborhood, which has demographically remained relatively unchanged since its establishment in the 19th century.

Highlights of the festival include live musical performances, carnival and casino games, carnival rides and fireworks. The Feast is also famous for its food, with numerous street booths operated by local restaurants and shops from around the neighborhood selling traditional Italian food and other items to the large crowds that come to the neighborhood from all over the Greater Cleveland area.
