= John T. Ewing =

American educator, college football coach (1856–1926)

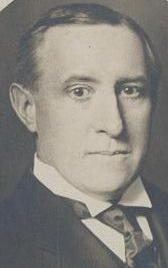
- Ewing at Alma College in 1906

Biographical details
- Born: October 29, 1856; Sparta, Illinois, U.S.
- Died: October 31, 1926 (aged 70); Alma, Michigan, U.S.

Coaching career (HC unless noted)
- 1894: Alma

Head coaching record
- Overall: 2–0

John Thomas Ewing (October 29, 1856 – October 31, 1926) was an American educator, university administrator, and college football coach. He taught as a professor of Classics and served as the registrar at Alma College for 36 years. Ewing was the head coach of the Alma football team in 1894.

== Biography ==
Ewing graduated from the University of Michigan with a Bachelor of Arts degree in 1880. From 1882 to 1887, he served as the superintendent of schools at Petoskey, Michigan. In 1887, he was hired to the faculty at the College of Wooster, where he served as the Principal of the Preparatory Department until 1890. Ewing received a Master of Arts degree from Wooster in 1890, where he studied Latin comedy. While at Wooster, Ewing worked with Cornelius Marshal Lowe on the "widely known" text Caesar's Gallic War, which was first published in 1891. In 1890, the chairman of Greek studies at Alma College resigned to take a job elsewhere, and Alma hired Ewing onto its faculty as a professor of ancient languages. Ewing remained at Alma College as a professor and the registrar for 36 years.

In 1894, Ewing was the head football coach at Alma, leading his team to record of 2–0.

Ewing died on October 31, 1926, after a brief illness.

== Head coaching record ==
| Year | Team | Overall | Conference | Standing | Bowl/playoffs |
|---|---|---|---|---|---|
Alma Maroon and Cream (Independent) (1894)
| 1894 | Alma | 2–0 | | | |
| Alma: | | 2–0 | | | |
| Total: | | 2–0 | | | |

== Published works ==
- Caesar's Gallic War, 1891.
