= Cozad–Bates House =

Historic house in Ohio, United States

- Justus L. Cozad House
- U.S. National Register of Historic Places
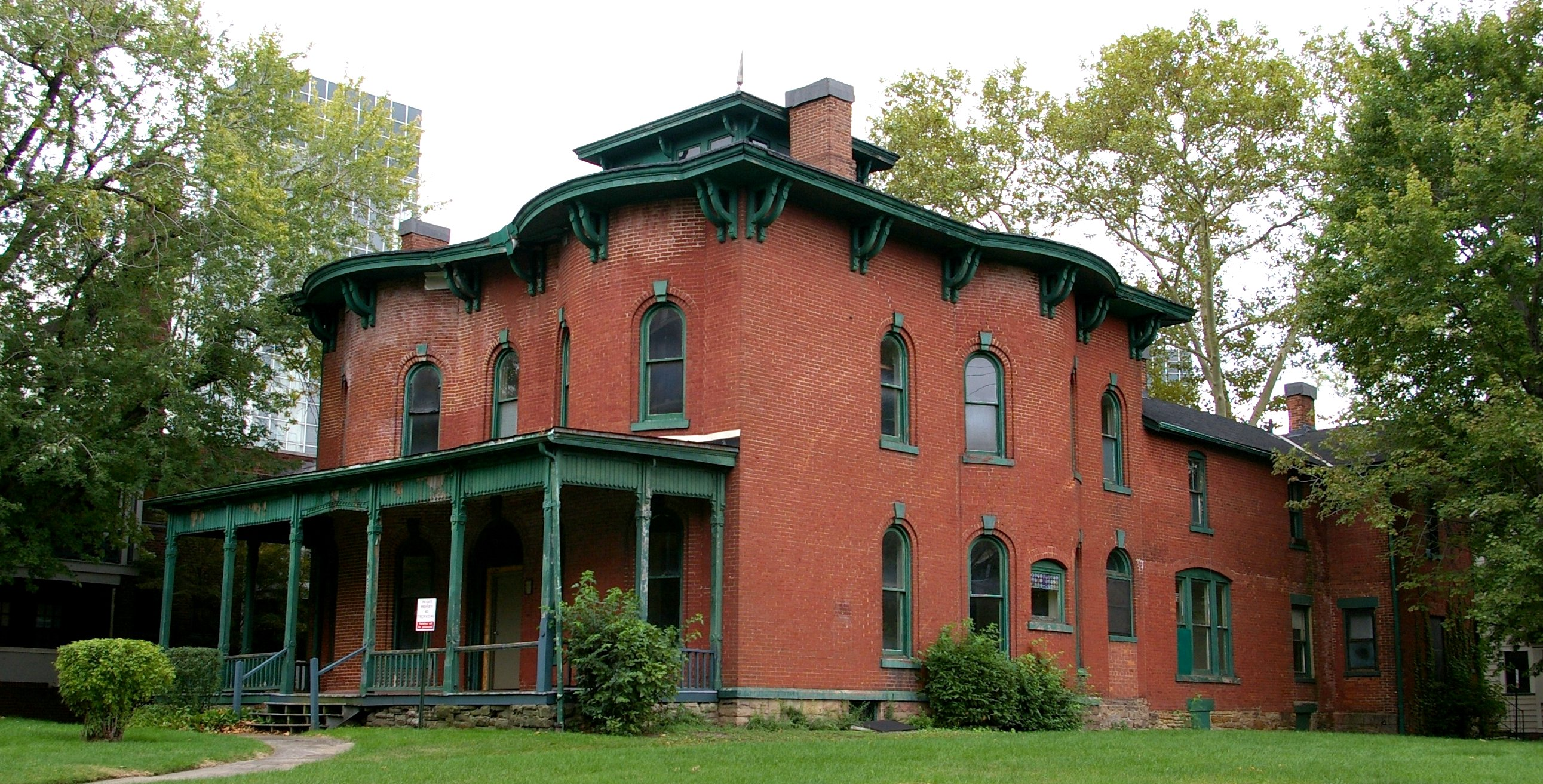
- Cozad–Bates House in Cleveland, Ohio

- Location within Cleveland Location within Ohio Location within the United States
- Location: 11508 Mayfield Rd., Cleveland, Ohio
- Coordinates: 41°30′29″N 81°36′11″W
- Area: less than one acre
- Built: 1853
- Architectural style: Italian Villa
- NRHP reference No.: 74001435
- Added to NRHP: January 18, 1974

Cozad–Bates House, also known as the Cozad–Bates House Interpretive Center, is the oldest and only surviving pre-Civil War structure in University Circle, Cleveland, Ohio, located at the Mayfield Road and East 115th Street intersection. It is historically known for its involvement in the Underground Railroad. Abolitionist Andrew Cozad built the house in 1853 for his son Justus L. Cozad, who in 1872 added an Italianate front to the structure. Architecturally, it is a rare surviving example of Italianate-influenced residential architecture in America at that time, which includes a hipped roof, curved bay windows, paired eave brackets, and prominent belvedere. The house was listed on the National Register of Historic Places in 1974 and designated as a Cleveland Landmark in 2006.

== Underground Railroad involvement ==
After the opening of the Ohio and Erie Canal in the 1830s, Cleveland became a destination for fugitive slaves and the bondsmen who tracked them. Before the Civil War, slaves moved through Ohio's Underground Railroad network that extended two hundred and fifty miles from Ripley to Cleveland. Known by the secret code name "Hope," Cleveland became a destination for freedom seekers making their way north to Canada. Persons seeking freedom were often aided by abolitionists in University Circle, formerly a part of East Cleveland Township. The Cozad family owned a large portion of the land which is now occupied by University Circle.

== Restoration ==
The nonprofit "Restore Cleveland Hope" spearheaded efforts to restore the house. On April 7, 2006, University Hospitals donated the house to University Circle, Inc. In 2007 a historical marker was erected by University Circle, Inc. and the Ohio Historical Society. The marker is located at 41° 30.512′ N, 81° 36.185′ W.

The Cozad–Bates House's rehabilitation was performed as a multi-phased endeavor. The initial steps included the replacement of the slate roof, guttering systems and construction repairs to the belvedere and chimneys. These repairs also included foundation and front porch restoration, and interior improvements. It was a four-month-long process costing $200,000, (~$279,996 in 2024) which was completed in August 2010. Funding was aided by state capital appropriation of $100,000 and donations by private donors. UCI and private donations helped cover the remaining funds needed to full renovate the structure, totaling $2 million.

In 2021, portions of the house were fully restored and opened as the Cozad–Bates House Interpretive Center, to highlight this area's history as a center of anti-slavery activism.
