= John Ewing (curator) =

Film curator and cinematheque founder

- Born: John Cameron Ewing; March 20, 1951 (age 75); Canton, OH
- Education: Denison University (BA)
- Occupations: Curator, Cinematheque Director
- Years active: 1973-2024
- Organization(s): Cleveland Cinematheque; Cleveland Museum of Art
- Known for: co-founding Cleveland Cinematheque
- Spouse: Kathy Miller (m. 1978)
- Children: 2
- Honors: Ordre des Arts et des Lettres Chevalier

John Ewing (born March 20, 1951) is an American art museum curator and co-founder of the Cleveland Cinematheque.

== Early life and education ==
Ewing grew-up in Canton, Ohio. He studied English, film, and theatre at Denison University, graduating with a bachelor of arts in 1973. While still at Denison, he began programming films for fellow students in his final semester.

He developed a further interest in the moving image as an intern at The Museum of Modern Art, staying late to privately screen films from their vast archives. Upon returning to his native Ohio he began to work as a film critic for local publications the Geauga Times Leader and Northern Ohio Live magazine.

== Career ==
Finding work as a film critic to be too negative, Ewing began instead to exhibit films for free at the Stark County library in 1975 as director of the Canton Film Society, a position he held from 1975 to 1983.

In 1984, he co-founded the Cleveland Cinematheque with Ron Holloway and George Gund III. Ewing began programming and screening films under the Cleveland Cinematheque banner at Case Western Reserve University in 1985. The Cinematheque would move to its permanent home at the Cleveland Institute of Art in 1986. He has served as director of the Cinematheque since its founding.

Ewing became curator of film at the Cleveland Museum of Art in 1986 and held that position until retiring in 2020.

In 2011, he was welcomed into the Ordre des Arts et des Lettres as Chevalier by the French Ministry of Culture for "significantly contributing to the enrichment of the French cultural inheritance".

Ewing retired from the Cinematheque and film programming on June 30, 2024.
