= Alta Public Library =

- U.S. National Register of Historic Places
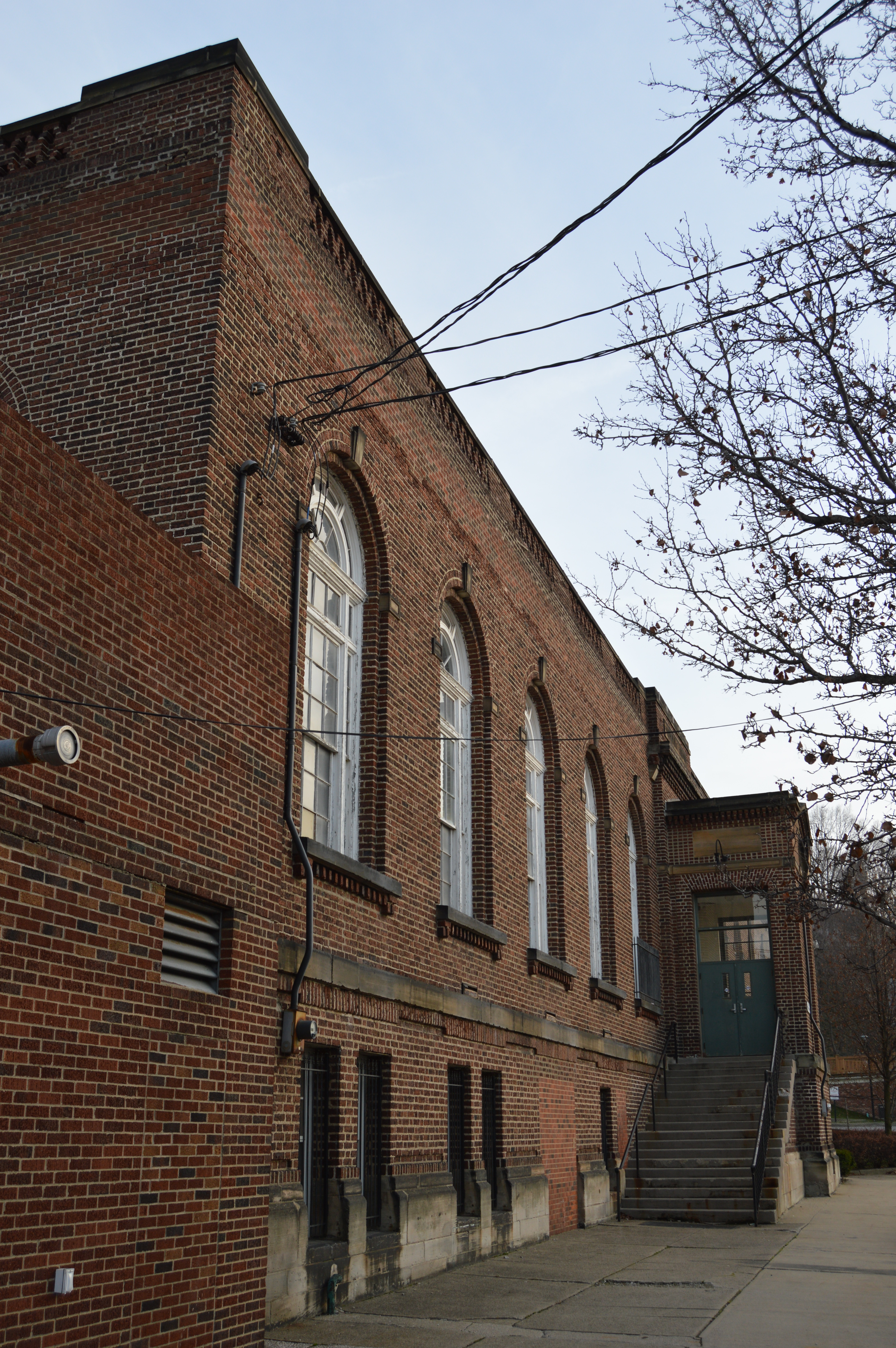

- Location within Cleveland Location within Ohio Location within the United States
- Location: 12510 Mayfield Road, Cleveland, Ohio, U.S.
- Coordinates: 41°30′31.17″N 81°35′45.81″W
- Architect: George B. Post & Sons
- Architectural style: Neoclassical
- NRHP reference No.: 05001143
- Added to NRHP: October 4, 2005

Alta Public Library is a historic library building in Cleveland, Ohio, in the United States. Designed by noted New York City architect George B. Post, the building (completed in 1914) was an addition to the existing Alta House, a settlement house for the Italian American community in Cleveland. Although Alta House burned in 1980 and was demolished in 1981, the library survived undamaged.

The Alta Public Library was listed on the National Register of Historic Places on October 4, 2005.

== Construction of Alta House and the Alta Public Library ==
In 1895, billionaire oilman John D. Rockefeller, Sr. agreed to fund the construction of a settlement house consisting of a kindergarten and day care nursery in the Little Italy area of Cleveland, Ohio. It was named Alta House, in honor of Rockefeller's daughter, Alta. Charles W. Hopkinson, a noted local architect, was commissioned to design the building, which opened in 1899.

In 1910, Rockefeller agreed to fund the expansion of Alta House to include a gym, library, and swimming pool. George B. Post designed the Neoclassical addition to Alta House as well as the library. The library opened on February 10, 1914.

== Fire and loss of Alta House ==
A fire struck the Alta House portion of the complex on June 22, 1980, doing $40,000 ($200,000 in 2025 dollars) in damage. A second fire on July 1 caused $8,000 ($0 in 2025 dollars) in damages. Both fires were later believed to be arson, although over time an electrical fault was found to be the cause of the first fire. Arsonists struck the building again twice more in the following weeks, although each blaze was small. The cumulative effect of the fires was to force Alta House programs to use the Alta Public Library building for programming.

City officials determined that the damage to Alta House was too extensive, and condemned the structure on November 12, 1980. Alta House officials decided to tear down the structure after determining that the cost of repairs would be more than $1 million ($3,900,000 in 2025 dollars), and that no company would insure the structure. Only the main building was razed, saving the Alta House swimming pool and gymnasium. The Alta Public Library was undamaged.

A new structure to house Alta House opened in May 1982. This consisted of a much smaller building (essentially a wing of the library), two stories in height. Bocce courts replaced much of the site of the old building.

In 2016, the Alta Public Library received a major refurbishment. Overseen by Cleveland architect Joseph Linek, the $1.6 million ($2,100,000 in 2025 dollars) renovation (partially funded by $240,000 ($300,000 in 2025 dollars) in historic preservation tax credits) included conservation, restoration, and refurbishment of the original oak floors, window wells, windows, and cornice brickwork. The Cleveland Montessori School joined the library in taking up residence in the renovated structure.
