= Holy Rosary Church (Cleveland) =

Historic church in Ohio, United States

- U.S. National Register of Historic Places
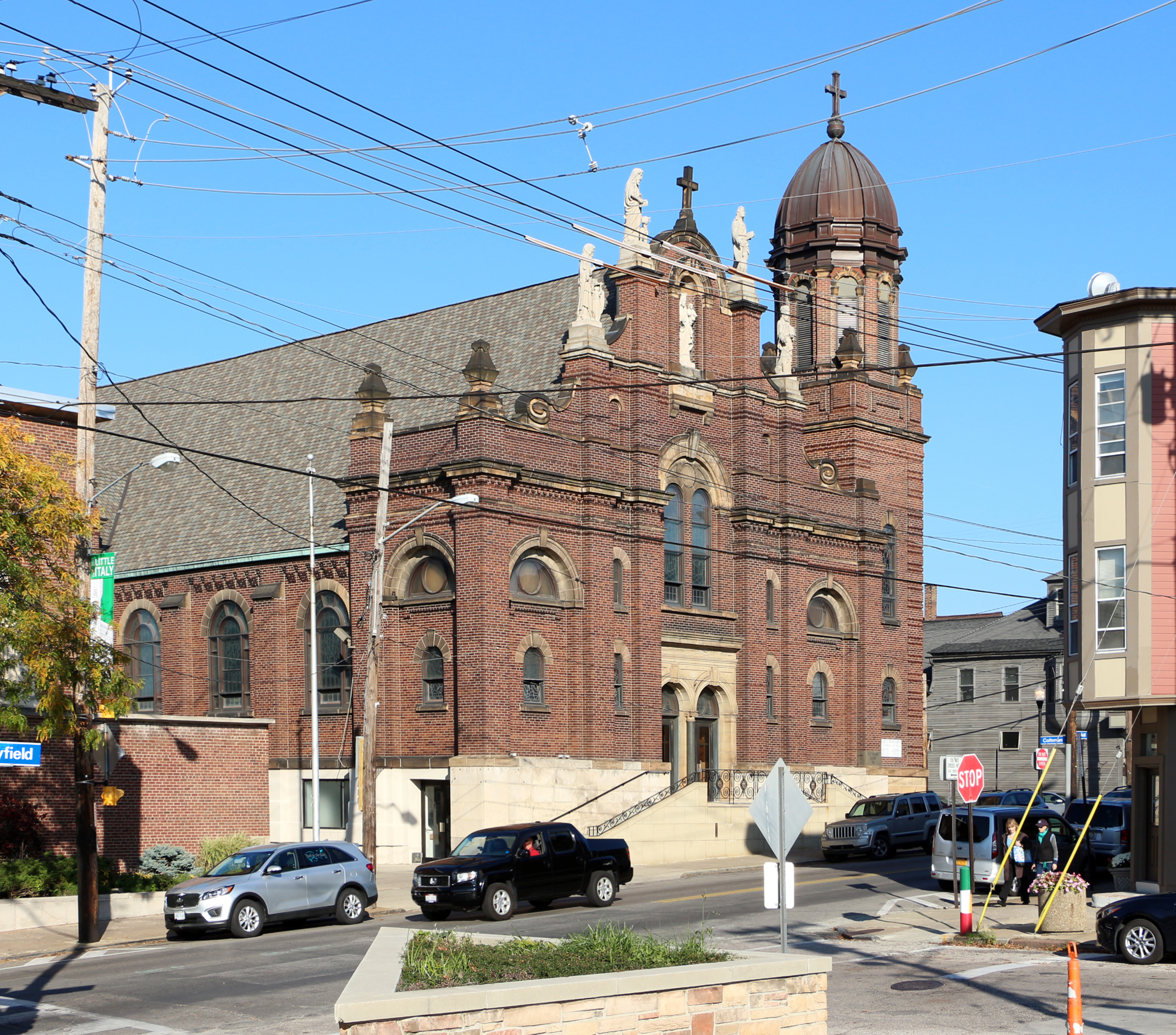
- Western side and front

- Location within Cleveland Location within Ohio Location within the United States
- Location: 12021 Mayfield Rd., Cleveland, Ohio
- Coordinates: 41°30′32″N 81°35′56″W
- Area: Less than 1 acre (0.40 ha)
- Built: 1905
- Architectural style: Baroque Revival
- NRHP reference No.: 76001397
- Added to NRHP: June 16, 1976

Holy Rosary Catholic Church is a historic Catholic parish church in the Little Italy neighborhood of Cleveland, Ohio, United States. Founded in the early 1890s, the parish completed the present Baroque-styled church shortly before 1910; the building has been named a historic site.

== History ==
By the early 1890s, a strong Italian immigrant community had been formed along Mayfield Road on the eastern edge of Cleveland, and priests from the nearby community of East Cleveland began ministering to these immigrants. Their efforts saw success: the Diocese of Cleveland formed Holy Rosary parish in 1892, and the first church building was erected by the year's end. Although Italian ties were strong in the community, they soon began to assimilate; religious education for children was offered at the church as early as 1896. At one time, Holy Rosary was one of approximately fifty national parishes in Cleveland, due to the city's rapid growth via European immigration; it was the first Italian parish in the city. The members arranged for the present building to be erected in 1905, although four years passed before it was ready for consecration.

== Architecture, construction and design ==
Many of Holy Rosary's earliest members were stone cutters, but their church does not reflect their craft: its walls are brick. The foundation is stone, and copper and stone are used for various external details. At the center of the facade, flights of stairs provide access to the double doors at the main entrance, above which two large arched windows are placed. The bays on the sides of the facade include large arched areas filled primarily with brick; only small arched windows and oculi penetrate these walls. Two belt courses, the lower more prominent than the upper, appear near the top of the facade; one is interrupted by the large arch windows above the entrance, while the other sits immediately above them. Numerous statues stand atop the facade at its significant points, while the building's eastern corner is topped by a domed cupola.

== Status on National Register of Historic Places ==
In 1976, Holy Rosary Church was listed on the National Register of Historic Places, qualifying both because of its architecture and its place in the community's history. It is one of several national parishes with this designation in the city, along with St. Elizabeth's (Hungarian), St. Michael's (German), St. Stanislaus' (Polish), and St. Stephen's (German).
