= Alejandro Zaera-Polo =

Spanish architect (born 1963)

Alejandro Zaera Polo
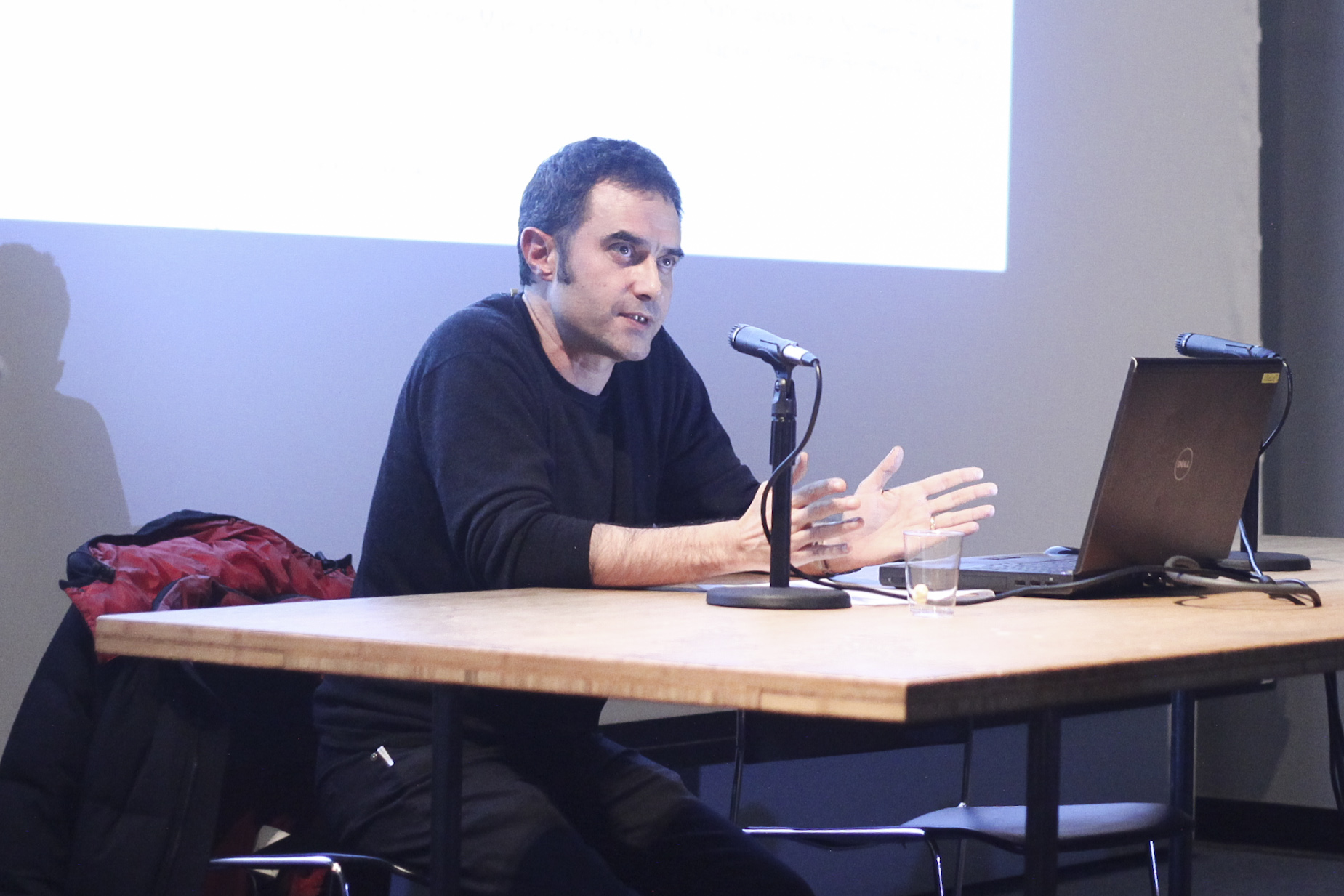
- Born: 17 October 1963 (age 63); Madrid, Spain
- Occupation: Architect
- Practice: AZPML; Foreign Office Architects
- Buildings: Osanbashi Yokohama International Passenger Terminal
- Projects: Korean Museum of Urbanism and Architecture

Alejandro Zaera-Polo

5th Dean of Princeton University School of Architecture
- In office 2012–2014
- Preceded by: Stan Allen
- Succeeded by: Mario Gandelsonas

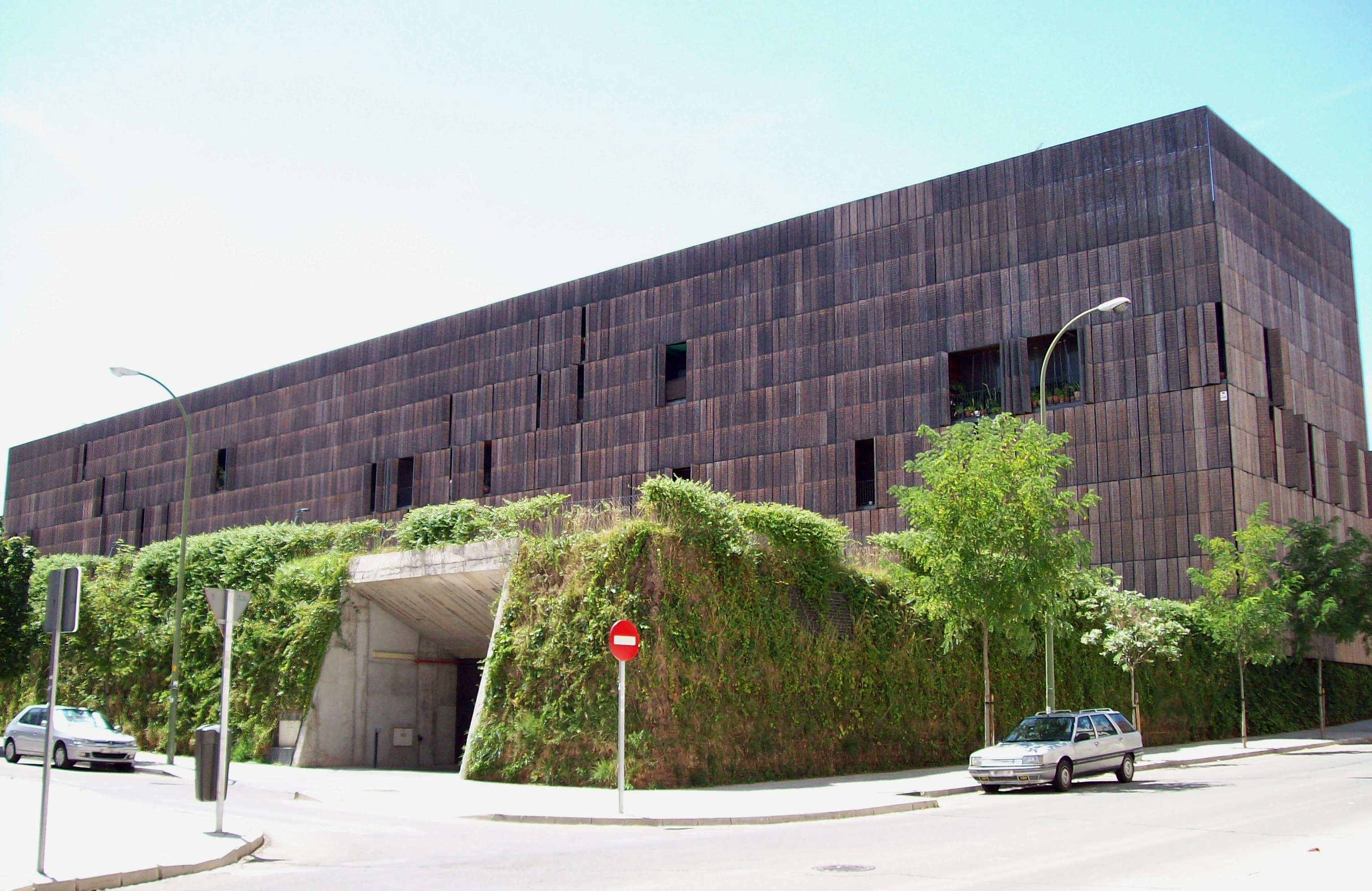
Bamboo Building (Madrid, 2007).

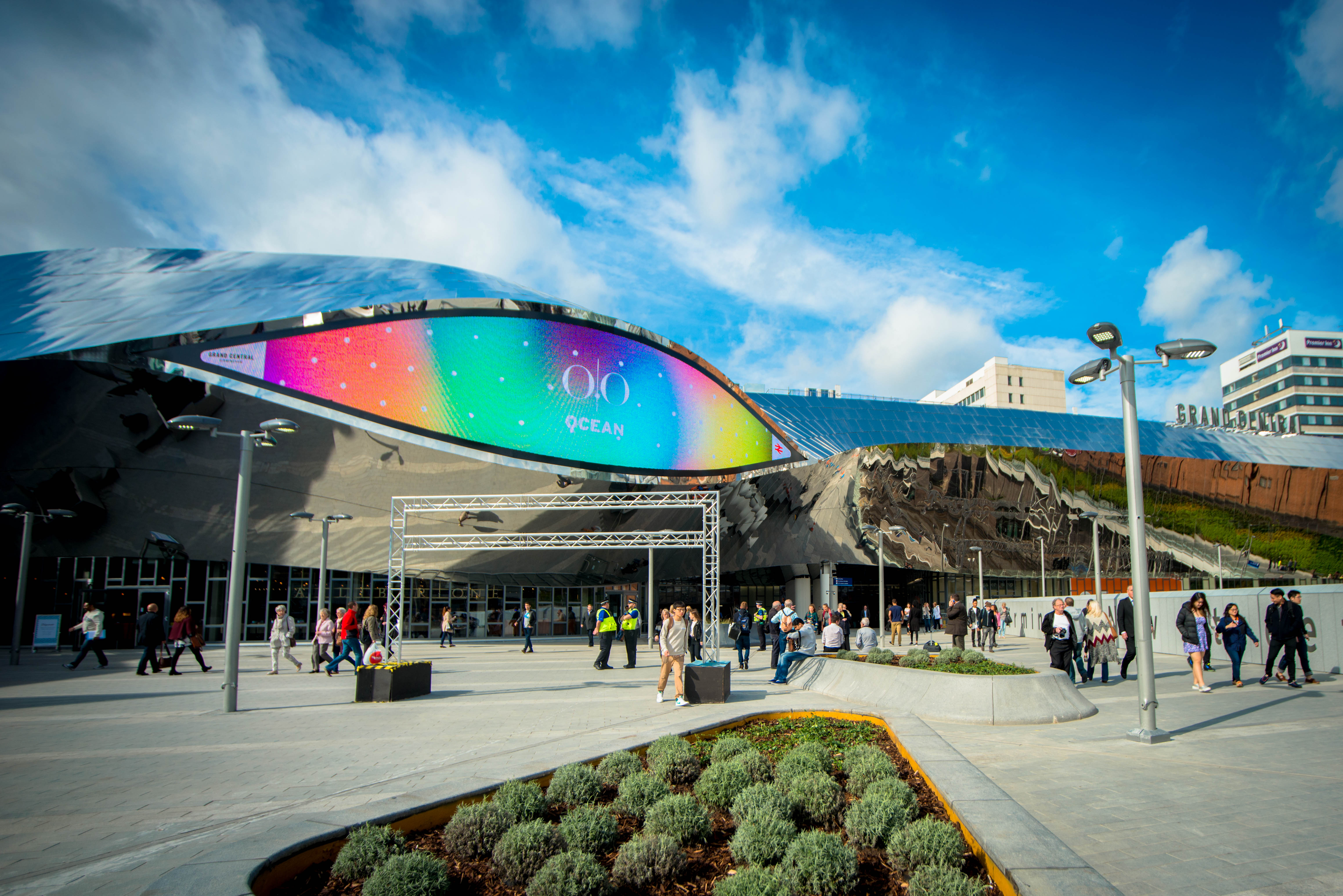
Birmingham New Street railway station, 2007–2015).

Alejandro Zaera Polo is a Spanish architect, theorist and founder of Alejandro Zaera-Polo & Maider Llaguno Architecture (AZPML). He was formerly dean of the Princeton University School of Architecture and of the Berlage Institute in Rotterdam. Prior to founding AZPML, he was co-founder of the London-based Foreign Office Architects, which operated between 1993 and 2011.

== Career ==
Alejandro Zaera-Polo was born in Madrid, Spain on 17 October 1963. He graduated with honors from the Escuela Técnica Superior de Arquitectura de Madrid, and subsequently obtained a Master in Architecture (MARCH II) at the Graduate School of Design, Harvard University in 1991, with distinction.

=== Architectural Practice ===
He worked at the Office for Metropolitan Architecture (OMA) in Rotterdam between 1991 and 1993. In 1993, he co-founded Foreign Office Architects with his then-wife Farshid Moussavi. The company produced acclaimed architectural projects in Japan, the United Kingdom, the United States, the Netherlands, and Spain. Following the end of the couple's marriage, the winding up of the studio's activities was announced in December 2009.

In June 2011, after the dissolution of FOA, he established Alejandro Zaera-Polo Architecture (AZPA), later renamed Alejandro Zaera-Polo & Maider Llaguno Architecture (AZPML).

He has also been an advisor to the Quality Commission for Architecture in Barcelona and a contributor to the Urban Age Think Tank of the London School of Economics. He has published as a critic in professional magazines worldwide. El Croquis, Quaderns, A+U, Arch+, Harvard Design Magazine, Log, and other magazines have published his writings.

He was the inaugural co-director of the Seoul Architecture Biennale in 2017.

=== Academic career ===
Alejandro Zaera-Polo has maintained a parallel academic career. He was the Dean of the School of Architecture at Princeton University (2012–2014), the Dean of the Berlage Institute in Rotterdam, and the inaugural beneficiary of the Norman Foster Visiting Professorship at Yale University. Prior to that, he was a Unit Master at the Architectural Association School of Architecture and has been a Visiting Critic at University of California, Los Angeles, Columbia University in New York, the School of Architecture in Madrid, and the Yokohama School of Architecture.

==== Plagiarism Controversy ====
While serving as Dean at Princeton University, Princeton architecture was featured at the Venice Biennale of Architecture in 2014. Zaera-Polo abruptly left his role as Dean, after he was accused by the Princeton University President of "plagiarizing parts of a text he produced for the "Elements of Architecture" exhibition curated by Rem Koolhaas at the 2014 Venice Biennale". Architect Rem Koolhaas emailed the Biennale's director to deny any wrongdoing by Zaera-Polo. Zaera-Polo also denied the accusations and as a result, Zaera-Polo filed a lawsuit against the university in 2016.

==== Dismissal and Gonzo Ethnography of Academic Authority ====
In the summer of 2021, Zaera-Polo was dismissed from his faculty position at the Princeton School of Architecture. In a series of seven videos under the title "A Gonzo Ethnography of Academic Authority. Princeton 2014-2021", Zaera-Polo accused Princeton University, and the Dean of the School of Architecture of deceitful and dishonest behavior, breach of the university rules, disregard for academic freedom, systemic misuse of affirmative action policies, conflict of interest, manipulation of evidence and coercion of students among others. The seven-session document referred to a downloadable folder of related evidence, with a summary text titled "The Fascisms of Identity in the Post-truth University". In the letter of dismissal contained in the evidence released by Zaera-Polo, Princeton University President Christopher Eisgruber cites reasons for Zaera-Polo's dismissal including "callous disregard for student well-being," "mistreating graduate students," "research misconduct" and "harass[ing]" colleagues." In turn, Zaera-Polo has accused President Eisgruber of "slander", "conflict of interest", "neglect of duty" and "deceitful behavior", and published related evidence in a link supplied in the videos. On 7 June 2022, The Daily Princetonian published an exposé diving into the events that led to Zaera-Polo's dismissal, which the former professor attributed to "cancel culture" and suppressed "academic freedom."

== Selected projects ==
=== Foreign Office Architects (FOA) ===
- Ōsanbashi Pier, also known as Yokohama Terminal, Yokohama, Japan (1995–2002)
- Bluemoon Hotel, Groningen, The Netherlands (1999–2000)
- Police headquarters, La Villajoyosa, Spain (2000-2003)
- Coastal park with outdoor auditoriums, Barcelona, Spain (2000-2004)
- Municipal Theatre, Torrevieja, Spain (2000-2006)
- La Rioja Technology Transfer Centre, Logrono (2003-2007)
- Bamboo Building, a social housing in Madrid (2004-7)
- Spanish Pavilion at the 2005 International Expo, Aichi (2004-5)
- Headquarters for Dulnyouk Publishers, Paju, South Korea (2000-5)
- Meydan Retail Complex and Multiplex, Istanbul, Turkey (2005-7)
- John Lewis department store and Cineplex and pedestrian bridges, Leicester, UK (2000-2008)
- Villa in Pedralbes, Barcelona, Spain (2004-8)
- D-38 Office Complex, Barcelona (2004–2009)
- New Street station, Birmingham (2008–15)
- Ravensbourne college on the Greenwich Peninsula, London (2005–2010)
- Trinity EC3 office complex, City of London (2003–)
- Mixed-use extension of West Quay II retail centre, Southampton (2002–)
- Sevenstone Quarter mixed-use complex, Sheffield, UK (2007–)
- Hadspen Gardens, Somerset, UK (2005–)
- The Palace Residential Towers in Busan, South Korea (2006–2011)
- Euston station, London, UK (2008-not completed)
- Museum of Contemporary Art, Cleveland, Ohio, USA (2006-)
- KL Central Plot D Residential Towers, Kuala Lumpur, Malaysia (2006-)

=== Alejandro Zaera-Polo & Maider Llaguno Architecture (AZPML) ===
- Birmingham New Street Redevelopment, Birmingham UK (2015)
- 2014 ISAF Sailing World Championship Facilities in Santander, Spain (2014)
- Locarno Palazzo del Cinema, Switzerland (2017)
- Fundacion Cerezales, Leon, Spain (2017)
- Pedestrian Bridge, Bellinzona, Switzerland (2019)
- Shenzhen Superheadquarters Green Axis, Shenzhen, China (2020)
- Korean Museum of Urbanism and Architecture, South Korea (2020-)

== Awards ==
This is a list of select awards and honours given to Zaera-Polo.

- Enric Miralles Prize for Architecture (2003)
- Kanagawa Prize for Architecture in Japan (2003)
- RIBA International Award (2004)
- Lion Award for Topography at the 9th Venice Architecture Biennale (2004)
- Charles Jencks Award for Architecture (2005)
- RIBA International Award (2005) for his work with Foreign Office Architects (FOA)
- RIBA International Award (2006)
- RIBA European Award (2008)
- European Business Award for the Environment (2008)
- Urban Land Institute Award for Excellence (2008)
- RIBA Award (2009)
- Civic Trust Award (2010)
- International Council of Shopping Centres Award (2010)
- International Architecture Award (2010)
- Mario Pani Prize, Anahuac University, Mexico City (2021)

== In popular culture ==
In Tite Kubo's manga series Bleach, the character Szayelaporro Grantz is named after Alejandro Zaera-Polo.

== Publications ==
=== Books ===
- Ito, Toyo; Kipnis, Jeffrey; Najle, Ciro (2001). "Foreign Office Architects". 2G N.16. 16. Barcelona, Spain: Gustavo Gili. ISSN 1136-9647. Archived from the original on 6 October 2007.
- Kubo, Michael (2002). The Yokohama Project. Barcelona, Spain: Actar. ISBN 978-8495951182. This book is about FOA and the construction of the Yokohama Terminal (Ōsanbashi Pier).
- The Yokohama Project, a monograph, Actar, Barcelona, Spain, 2002
- Phylogenesis: foa’s ark, Actar, Barcelona, Spain, 2003
- Foreign Office Architects, Complexity and consistency, A monograph, El Croquis, # 115/116, Madrid, Spain, 2003
- FOA's ark evolving container for the proliferating singularities, Korean Architecture and Culture Magazine, December 2004
- The Sniper's Log. Architectural Chronicles of Generation X. Actar, Barcelona, Spain, 2013.
- What Is Cosmopolitical Design? Design, Nature and the Built Environment Routledge, Oxfordshire, UK, 2017 (Edited with Albena Yaneva)
- Imminent Commons: Urban Questions for the Near Future Actar, Barcelona, Spain, 2017. (Edited with Hyungmin Pai)
- Imminent Commons: The Expanded City. Actar, Barcelona, Spain, 2017 (Edited with Jeffrey S. Anderson)
- Arquitetura em Diálogo Ubu Editora, São Paulo, Brazil, 2018
- The Ecologies of the Building Envelope. A Material History and Theory of Architectural Surfaces Actar, Barcelona, Spain, 2021. (with Jeffrey S. Anderson)

=== Other texts ===
- Interview with Peter Macapia, Log, #3, Fall 2004
- 'A Scientific Autobiography, 1982-2004: Madrid, Harvard, OMA, the AA, Yokohama, the Globe', in The New Architectural Pragmatism, (ed. William S. Saunders), Minneapolis: University of Minnesota Press, 2007
- '30 St Mary's Axe: Form isn't Facile', Log, #4, Winter 2005
- 'The Hokusai Wave', Volume, #3, September 2005
- 'High-rise Phylum 200', Harvard Design Magazine, Spring 2007
- The Endless City (eds. Richard Burdett and Deyan Sudjic), Phaidon, 2007. ISBN 0714848204
- 'The Politics of the Envelope', Log #13|14, Fall 2008
- 'The Politics of the Envelope', Volume #17, Fall 2008
- 'Well Into the 21st Century The Architectures of Post-Capitalism?' El Croquis #187, Nov. 2017
