= Farshid Moussavi =

Iranian-British architect (born 1965)

Farshid Moussavi OBE RA
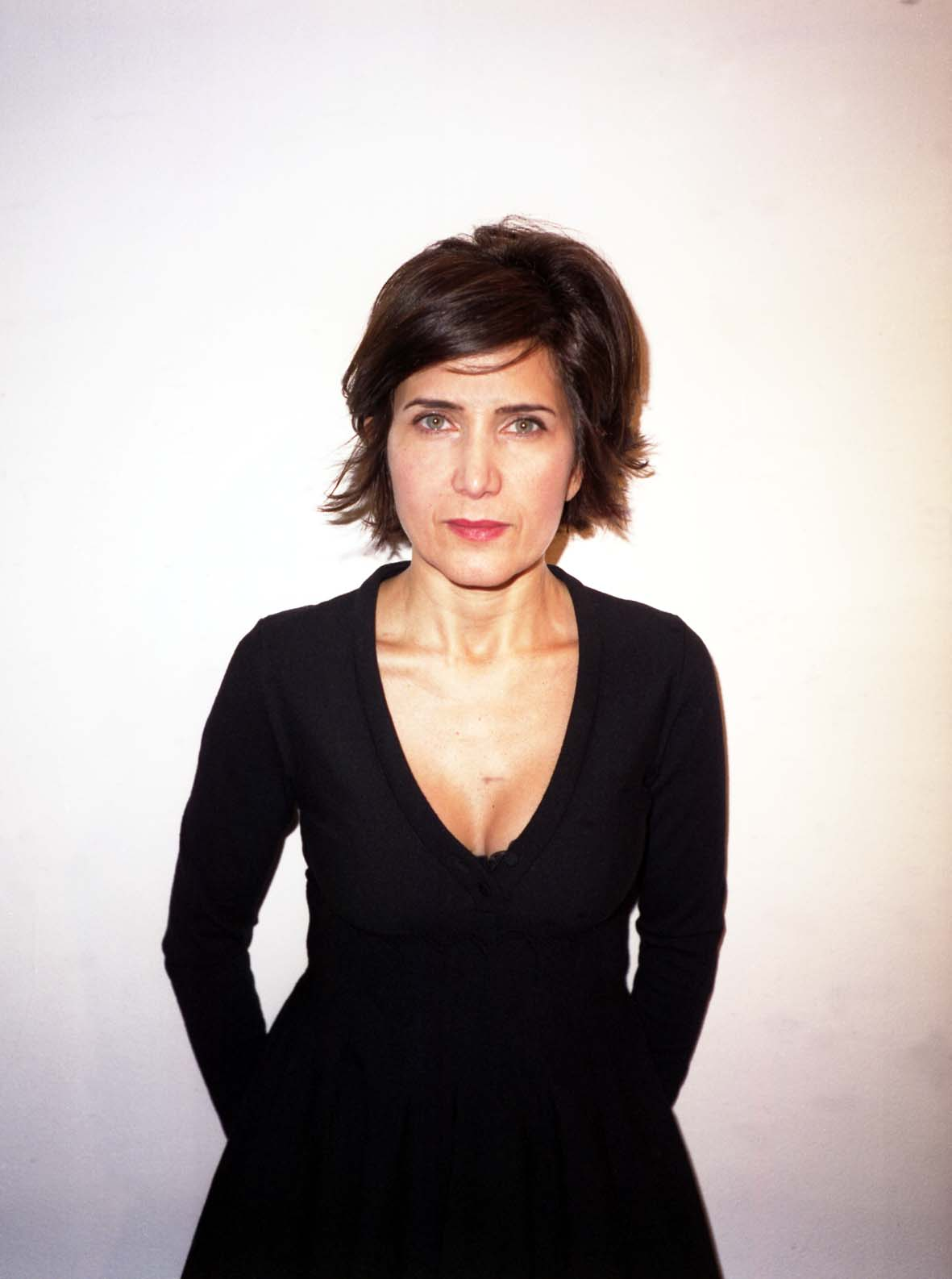
- Born: 1965 (age 60–61); Shiraz, Iran
- Education: Harvard University; Bartlett School of Architecture, University College London; Dundee University
- Occupation: Architect
- Practice: Farshid Moussavi Architecture; Previously Foreign Office Architects
- Buildings: Ōsanbashi, International Passenger Terminal, Yokohama, Kanagawa, Japan; Museum of Contemporary Art, Cleveland, Ohio
- Website: Official website

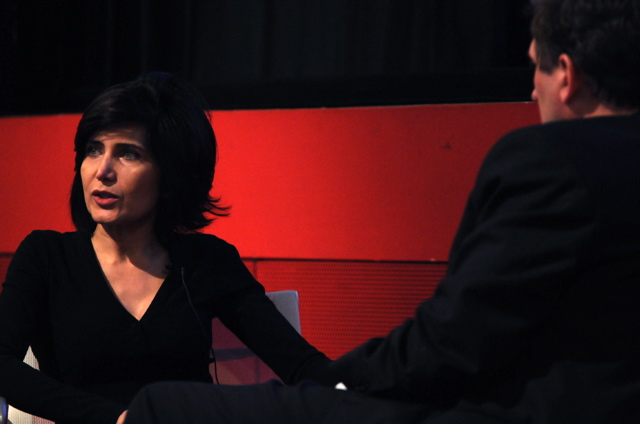
Farshid Moussavi at the Tate Gallery

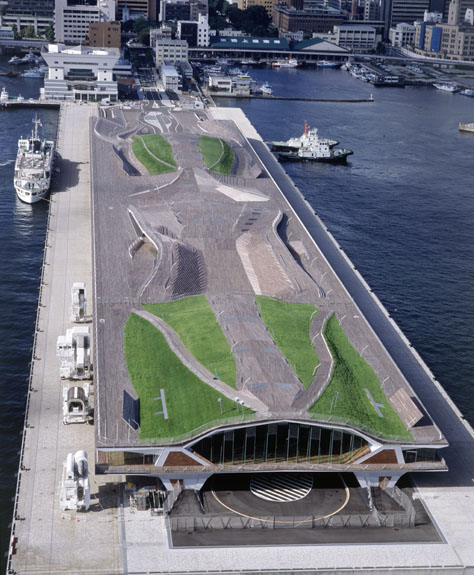
Yokohama International Passenger Terminal

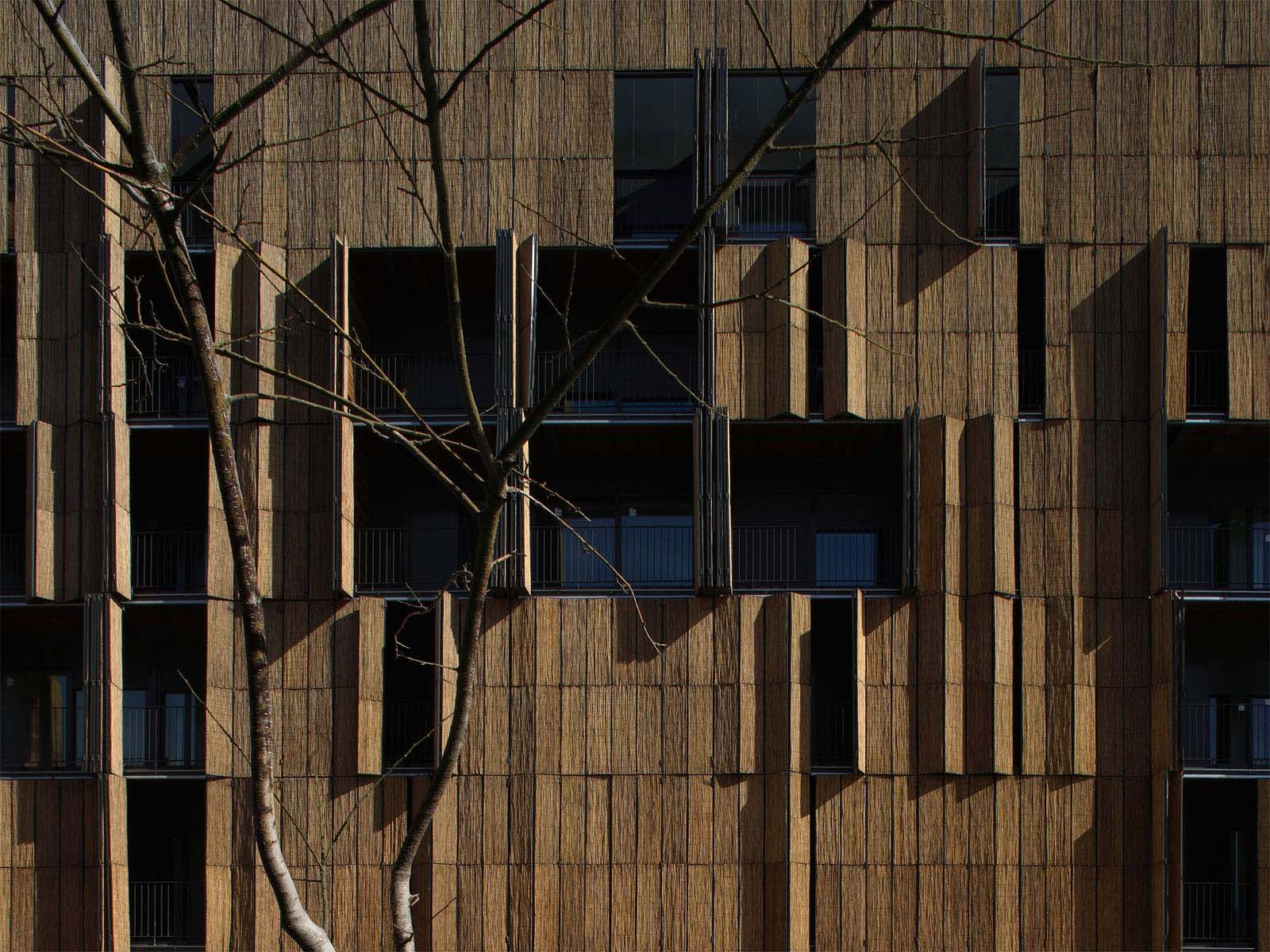
Detail of the façade of Edificio Bambú (literally "Bamboo Building" Carabanchel Social Housing in Madrid).

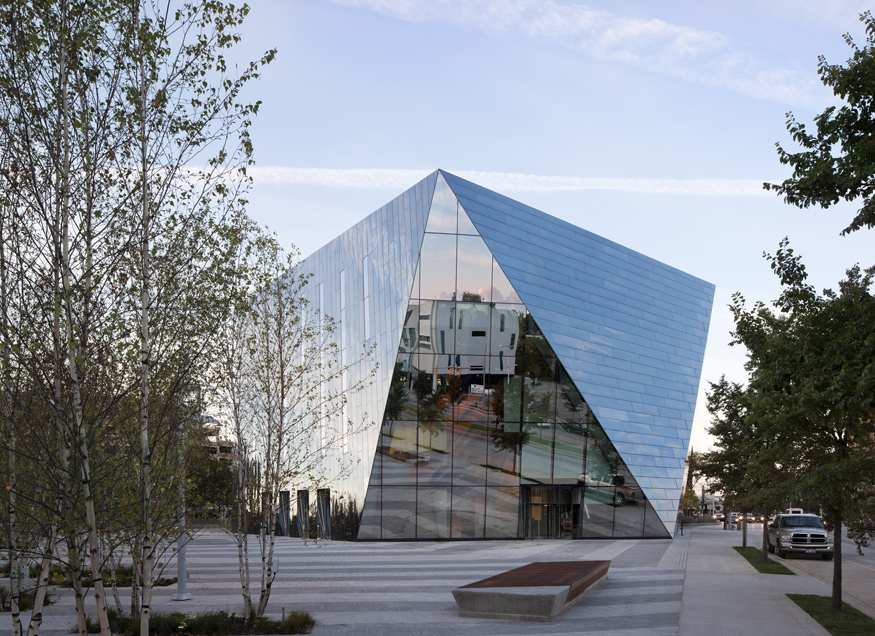
Museum of Contemporary Art, Cleveland

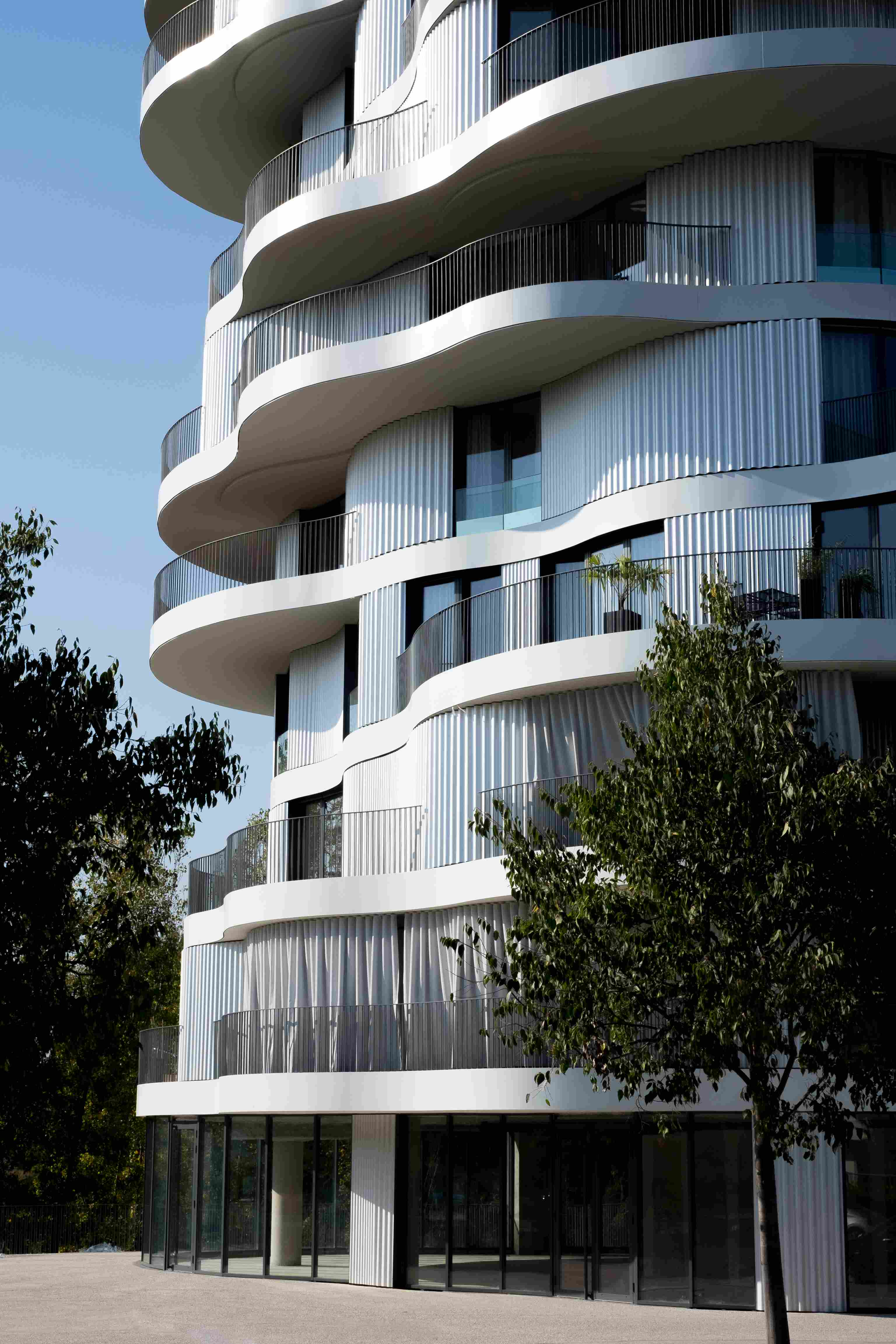
Folie Divine, Montpellier

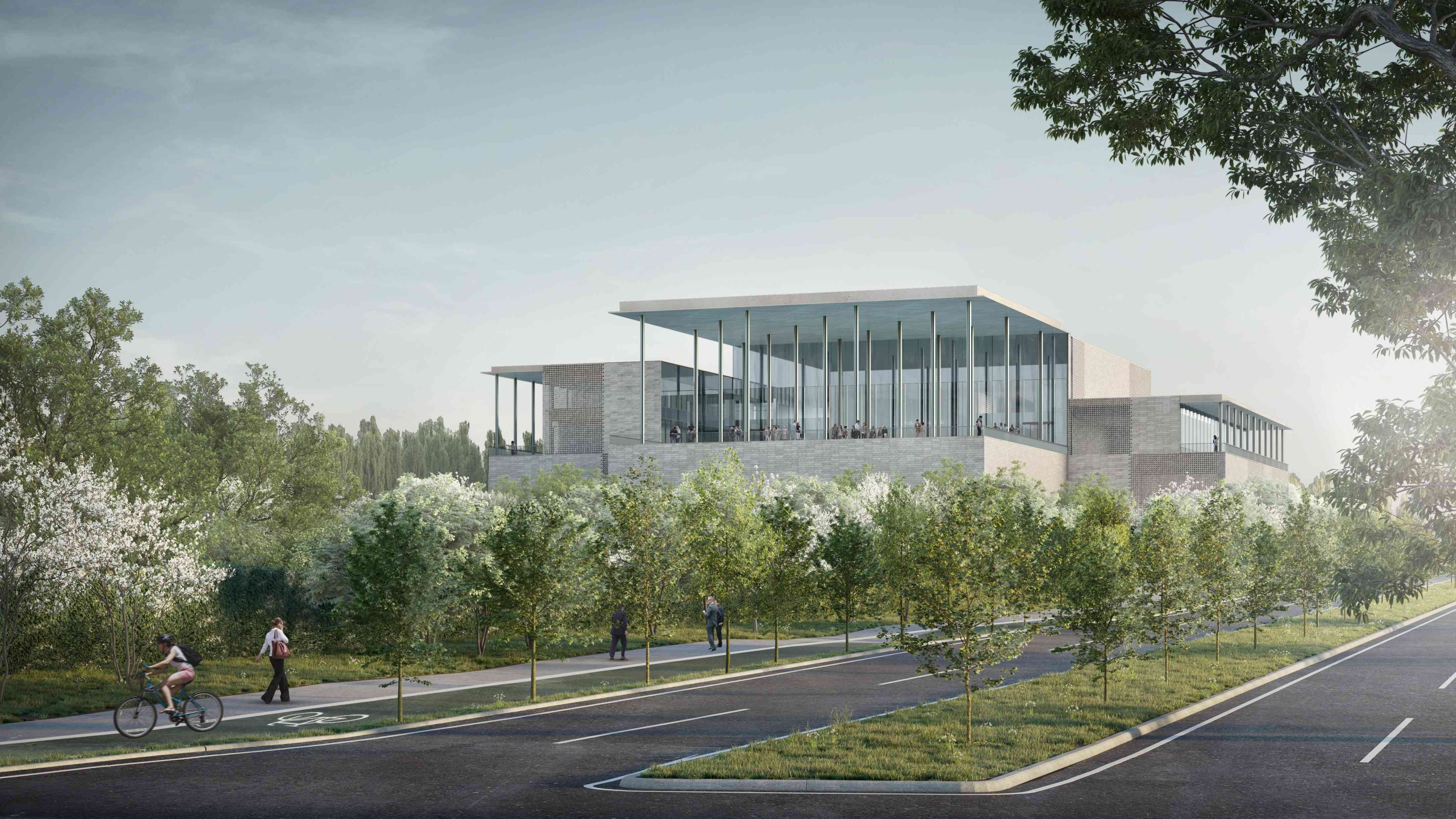
Ismaili Center, Houston

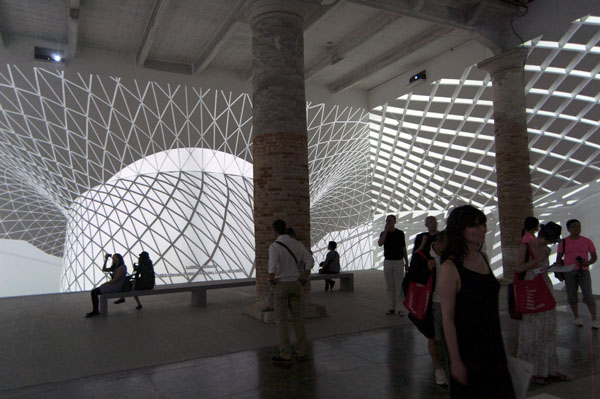
Installation exploring affect for Common Ground at 13th Venice Biennale

Farshid Moussavi OBE RA (born 1965) is a British architect, educator, and author. She is the founder of Farshid Moussavi Architecture (FMA) and a professor in Practice of Architecture at Harvard University Graduate School of Design.

The work of Moussavi's London-based practice, FMA, is celebrated for projects that integrate an inventive approach to space and materials and a strong social awareness, whether they are a cultural centre such as the Museum of Contemporary Art in Cleveland or a community centre such as the Ismaili Center in Houston, a social housing project in Montpellier, or an elementary school in Saclay (under development), both in France. Prior to founding FMA, she was co-founder of the London-based Foreign Office Architects or FOA (1993–2011), recognised as one of the world's most creative design firms, integrating architecture, urban design, and landscape architecture in a wide range of projects internationally.

Moussavi was elected a Royal Academician in 2015, and subsequently, Professor of Architecture at the RA Schools in 2017. She was appointed Officer of the Order of the British Empire (OBE) in the 2018 Birthday Honours for Services to Architecture. In 2022 she was selected as one of the London Mayor's 42 Design Advocates to support his vision for 'Good Growth' and was named in 2025 as one eight Town Architects to support the future development of eight locations in London.

== Early life and education ==
Moussavi was born in 1965 in Shiraz, Iran. She immigrated to London in 1979 to attend boarding school. She trained in architecture at the Dundee School of Architecture, University of Dundee, in Scotland, the Bartlett School of Architecture, University College London and graduated with a Masters in Architecture (MArch II) from the Harvard University Graduate School of Design (GSD).

== Career ==
Moussavi first came to prominence with Foreign Office Architects (FOA), the practice she co-founded in 1993 with Alejandro Zaera-Polo. At FOA, Moussavi co-authored the design for the award-winning Yokohama International Ferry Terminal in Japan (which was subject to an international design competition in 1995) and was part of the United Architects team who were finalists in the Ground Zero competition. She also completed a wide range of international projects including the John Lewis complex in Leicester, England, the Meydan retail complex in Istanbul, Turkey, Carabanchel Social Housing in Madrid, and the South-East Coastal Park in Barcelona, Spain.

In June 2011, after splitting with Zaera-Polo, Moussavi re-established her own London-based practice, Farshid Moussavi Architecture (FMA). Her notable projects with FMA include the Museum of Contemporary Art Cleveland, The Ismaili Center, Houston, in the US, Victoria Beckham's Flagship Store in London, a multi-storey and multi-tenure affordable residential block in the La Défense-Nanterre district of Paris, the Folie Divine residential tower in Montpellier, and the Harrods Toys Department in London. The practice is currently working on a number of high-profile projects including an elementary school in the Saclay district of Paris, a mixed-use block in Montpellier, and a flagship store in Shanghai.

== Research ==
Alongside her professional practice, Moussavi has held a longstanding commitment to research across the academic and professional fields of architecture. Since 2005, she has been a professor in Practice at Harvard University Graduate School of Design. Previously, Moussavi taught at the Architectural Association in London for eight years (1993–2000), and was subsequently appointed as Head of the Academy of Fine Arts in Vienna (2002–2005). She has been a visiting professor of architecture at the Berlage Institute in Rotterdam, the Hoger Architectuur Instituut Sint-Lucas in Gent, and in the US, at UCLA, Columbia University and Princeton University.

Moussavi's research, which began while teaching at the Architectural Association in the early 90s, has focused on instruments that allow architects to embed built forms with design intelligence and creative possibilities – such as the diagram, information technology, new construction technologies, envelopes and tessellation – and how they can be used to develop alternative concepts for the practice of architecture.

Since 2004, Moussavi's research has focused predominantly on the relationship between the construction and experience of a built form, and how the architect's agency is to navigate the many choices provided by the design process to give built forms the unique propensities which individuals experience as affect. Her work in aesthetics is influenced by a range of philosophers, notably Spinoza, Gilles Deleuze and Félix Guattari, and Jacques Rancière. Following from Gilles Deleuze's work on affect, she proposes that built forms' affects play an active role in the daily experiences of individuals and the affections they develop. Moussavi argues that, in order to move people's experience away from routine and to open up the possibility for new types of action, architects need to provide built forms with novel affects. It is not what built forms represent but how they provide experiences that would otherwise not exist that makes their aesthetic experience relevant and gives their architecture a function or agency in culture.

Moussavi has published three books: The Function of Ornament, The Function of Form and The Function of Style in conjunction with her teaching at Harvard, all of which disclaim architecture's traditional binary oppositions – form vs. function, structure vs. form, ornament vs. function, style vs. function – proposing that architecture's creative potential lies, rather, in finding ways to relate them to one another.

In her fourth and most recent book titled Architecture and Micropolitics, Four Buildings 2011–2022, Farshid Moussavi Architecture (2022), she argues that the temporality of architecture provides day-to-day practice with the potential to generate change and proposes that architects should embrace chance events and the subjective factors that influence practice in order to ground buildings in the micropolitics of everyday life.

Alongside these publications, Moussavi has also curated a number of exhibitions which aim to create a dialogue between art and architecture. In 2024, she curated the Architecture as an Instruction-Based Art Exhibition at Harvard Graduate School of Design, and in 2025 she coordinated the Royal Academy's Summer Exhibition, themed "Dialogues," marking the first time architecture was intentionally mixed into the main displays with other art forms like painting and sculpture, breaking tradition to foster cross-disciplinary conversations.

== Select projects ==
=== Farshid Moussavi Architecture ===
- 2026 – Ismaili Cultural Center, Houston, US
- 2023 – Present: Elementary School, Saclay, Paris, France
- 2023 – Present: Mixed-use block, Montpellier, France
- 2023 – Present: Flagship Store, Shanghai
- 2022 – House, Hove, UK
- 2022 – Fiorucci Pop-up Stores, London, UK
- 2022 – Installation for one of the galleries on the theme of Climate at the Royal Academy Summer Exhibition 2022, London, UK
- 2021 – Harrods World Department, Harrods Department Store, London, UK
- 2021 – Installation for How Will We Live Together? at the 17th Venice Architecture Biennale, Venice, Italy
- 2019 – Installation for Is This Tomorrow? at the Whitechapel Gallery, London, UK
- 2019 – Design of Magdalene Odundo: The Journey of Things exhibition at the Hepworth Wakefield, UK
- 2018 – Harrods Toys Department, London, England
- 2017 – Residential Complex, La Défense-Nanterre, Paris, France
- 2017 – Folie Divine residential tower, Montpellier, France
- 2017 – Design and installation for an exhibition on Architectural Drawings at the Royal Academy Summer Exhibition, London, UK
- 2016 – Victoria Beckham Flagship Store, London, England
- 2012 – Museum of Contemporary Art, Cleveland, Ohio, US
- 2012 – Installation for Common Ground at 13th Venice Architecture Biennale, Venice, Italy

=== Foreign Office Architects ===
- 2010 – Ravensbourne Design and Communication College, London, UK
- 2007 – Carabanchel Social Housing, Madrid, Spain
- 2000 – 2008 – John Lewis department store and Cineplex and pedestrian bridges, Leicester, England
- 2004 – South-East Coastal Park and Auditoriums, Barcelona, Spain
- 2002 – British Pavilion at the 8th Venice Architecture Biennale Next. Venice, Italy
- 2002 – Yokohama International Port Terminal, Yokohama, Japan
- 2002 – Spanish Pavilion at the International Expo in Aichi
- 2002 – Auditorium, Torrevieja, Spain
- 2002 – Police Station, La Villajoyosa, Spain

== Awards ==
This is a select list of Moussavi and Foreign Office Architects (FOA) awards.

Year	Award name	To	By	For	Notes
2004	Enric Miralles Prize for Architecture	Foreign Office Architects		Yokohama International Passenger Terminal	
2004	Lion Award for Topography	Foreign Office Architects	9th Venice Architecture Biennale		
2011	RIBA Award in the education and community category	Foreign Office Architects	Royal Institute of British Architects (RIBA)	Ravensbourne campus	
2018	Order of the British Empire (OBE) award	Farshid Moussavi	Order of the British Empire	Awarded for service and diversity in the architecture profession	
2021	UCL Honorary Fellowship	Farshid Moussavi	UCL (University College London)	In recognition of distinguished career in Architecture and contribution to widening participation in architectural education and practice	
2021	Prix des Femmes Architectes - Prix International 2021	Farshid Moussavi	ARVHA (Association pour le Recherche et l'Habitat) in France	Outstanding contribution to architecture internationally	
2022	Jane Drew Prize	Farshid Moussavi	The Architects' Journal	Awarded for showing innovation, diversity and inclusiveness in architecture	
2022	Honorary Fellow	Farshid Moussavi	Ravensbourne University, London		
2023	Regional Award	Farshid Moussavi Architecture	RIBA South-East	House in Hove, Sussex, UK	
2025	Arnold W. Brunner Memorial Prize	Farshid Moussavi	The American Academy of Arts and Letters	For a significant contribution to architecture as an art	
2026	Soane Medal	Farshid Moussavi	Sir John Soane's Museum	For significantly advancing public understanding of architecture	

== Publications ==
=== Books ===
- Moussavi, Farshid; Kubo, Michael (2006). The Function of Ornament. Harvard Graduate School of Design, ACTAR. ISBN 978-8496540507.
- Moussavi, Farshid; Lopez, Daniel; Schricker, Ahmadreza; Ambrose, Garrick (2009). The Function of Form. Harvard Graduate School of Design, ACTAR. ISBN 978-8496954731.
- Moussavi, Farshid (2014). The Function of Style. ACTAR. ISBN 978-1940291307.
- Moussavi, Farshid (2022). Architecture & Micropolitics, Four Buildings, Farshid Moussavi Architecture 2010–2022. Park Books. ISBN 978-3-03860-194-4.

=== Articles ===
- Moussavi, Farshid (2012). “30 St. Mary Axe”. Harvard Design Magazine, Volume 35, USA.
- Moussavi, Farshid (2012) An Archeological Approach, Instigations: Engaging Architecture, Landscape, and the city (2012) GSD075, Edited by Mohsen Mostafavi and Peter Christensen in cooperation with Harvard University Graduate School of Design.
- Moussavi, Farshid (21 September 2011). "Viewpoints: Farshid Moussavi on the need for parametric thinking". The Architectural Review.
- Moussavi, Farshid (24 December 2011). "Viewpoints: Farshid Moussavi on Activism". The Architectural Review.
- Moussavi, Farshid (28 May 2012). "Farshid Moussavi on Women in Architecture". The Architectural Review.
- Moussavi, Farshid (28 September 2012). "School buildings produce culture". The Architectural Review.
- Moussavi, Farshid (31 January 2013). "Viewpoints: Farshid Moussavi on Competitions". The Architectural Review.
- Moussavi, Farshid (19 December 2013). "Farshid Moussavi: Planning is an art form". The Architectural Review.
- Moussavi, Farshid (4 June 2014). "Style and Substance: Interview with Farshid Moussavi". The Architectural Review.
- 2018 Project Interrupted: Lectures by British Housing Architects, The Architecture Foundation, UK.
- Moussavi, Farshid (2022). The Function of Ornament in the Ismaili Center Houston in The Clamor of Ornament: Exchange, Power, and Joy from the Fifteenth Century to the Present. Published by The Drawing Center, NY.

== See also ==
- List of Iranian women in design
