= Ōsanbashi Pier =

Ship terminal in Yokohama, Japan

Yokohama International Passenger Terminal
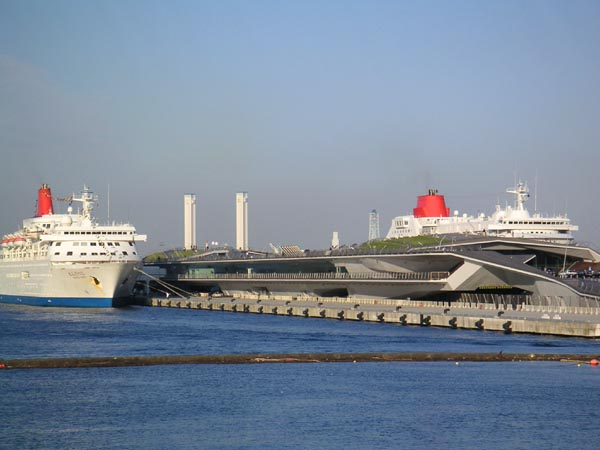
- Ōsanbashi, International Passenger Terminal, Yokohama, Kanagawa, Japan
- Interactive map of the Yokohama International Passenger Terminal area

General information
- Location: Yokohama, Japan
- Opening: 2002

Technical details
- Floor area: 34,732 m^{2} (373,850 sq ft)

Design and construction
- Architect: Foreign Office Architects
- Main contractor: Shimizu Corporation, Toa Construction Corporation

Ōsanbashi Pier (大さん橋, ōsanbashi; pronounced [oːsambaɕi]) is the main international passenger pier at the Port of Yokohama, located in Naka Ward, Yokohama, Japan. Ōsanbashi is the oldest pier in Yokohama, originally constructed between 1889 and 1896.

Major cruise ships such as the Queen Elizabeth 2 were at one time embarked here, although 90,000 GWT ships such as MS Queen Elizabeth are often obliged to use nearby container terminals owing to their enormous size. The pier is also known as one of the best places to see the Yokohama Three Towers (The King, Queen and the Jack)

== History ==
The Port of Yokohama was opened in 1859 as a direct result of the signing of the Treaty of Amity and Commerce, and the Ansei Treaties signed between the Tokugawa Shogunate and the governments of the United States, Great Britain, France, The Netherlands and Russia. Yokohama grew rapidly as a treaty port and commercial center due to its proximity to Tokyo, natural deep water harbour and protection from strong winds by the Honmoku bluff.

Initially the port only offered two small stone wharfs for visiting ships, built on the current site of the modern Ōsanbashi Pier. The two wharfs, known as the French and English Hatoba, were too shallow for the ocean going ships to dock, and so barges were used to carry passengers and freight to and from the ships in the outer harbour. In 1894, the Japanese government provided funding for an extended steel pier to replace the English Hatoba. Designed by British engineer, Henry Spencer Palmer, the new pier was able to accommodate up to four ships simultaneously.

Although the pier was repaired and enlarged several times, it survived the 1923 Great Kantō earthquake, and the bombing raids of World War II largely intact. During the occupation the pier was renamed South Pier and remained under occupation forces control until 1952.

In 1964, a reconstruction of Ōsanbashi Passenger Terminal was completed in time before the 1964 Tokyo Olympics.

== Current pier ==
Various scenes of Osanbashi Pier, 2023

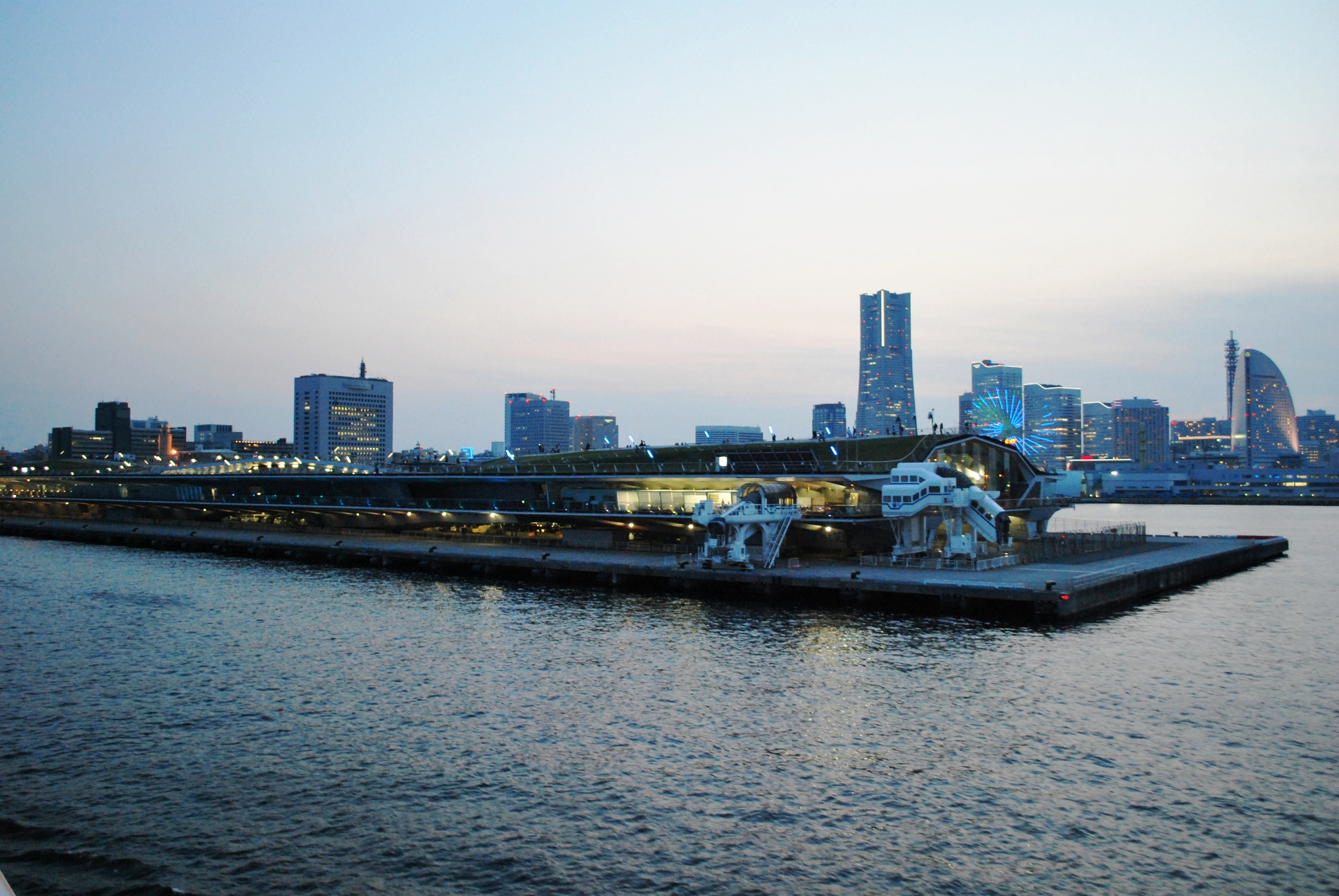
Osanbashi Pier with a view towards the buildings of Minato Mirai 21

To meet modern demands, Ōsanbashi Pier was again reconstructed between 1988 and 2002. The newly reconstructed passenger terminal is named the Yokohama International Passenger Terminal, designed by Foreign Office Architects (Alejandro Zaera-Polo and Farshid Moussavi), the pier was the subject of a major international design competition attracting over 660 entries. The new pier can accommodate up to four 30,000-ton class ships or two 70,000-ton class ships at the same time. The departure/arrival lobby, ticketing booth, customs, immigration, large multipurpose hall, shops and cafe are all on the 2nd floor of this terminal. There is a parking facility on the 1st floor, and an extensive, gently curving observation deck with planted grass areas, open to the public on the rooftop.

The Port and City of Yokohama developed other renovation and construction projects in the waterfront area, such as the Minato Mirai 21 project, in this time frame.

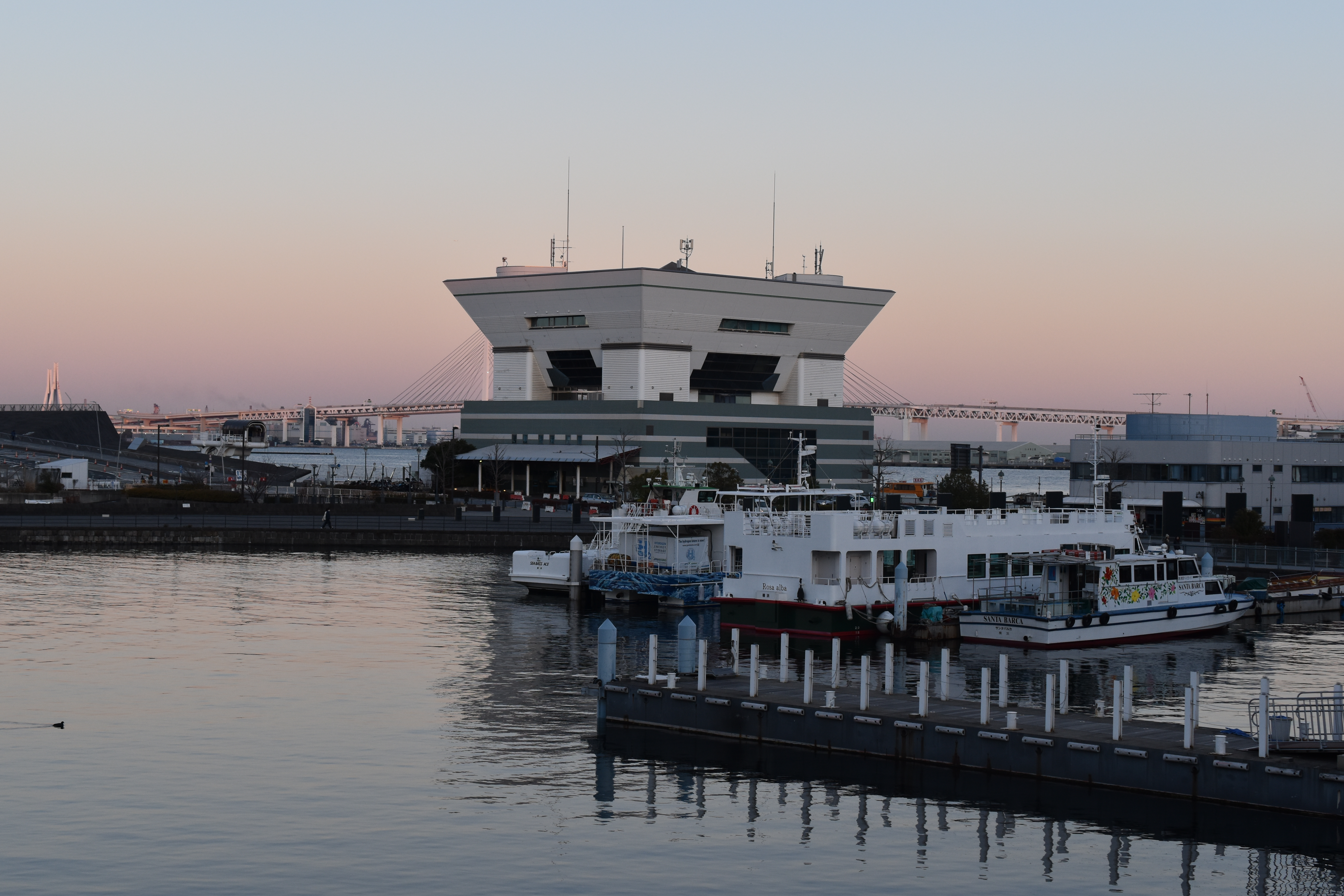
The Ōsanbashi Pier Building, a former passenger terminal built in 1993

== See also ==
- World Architecture Survey
