= Grand Central, Birmingham =

Grand Central
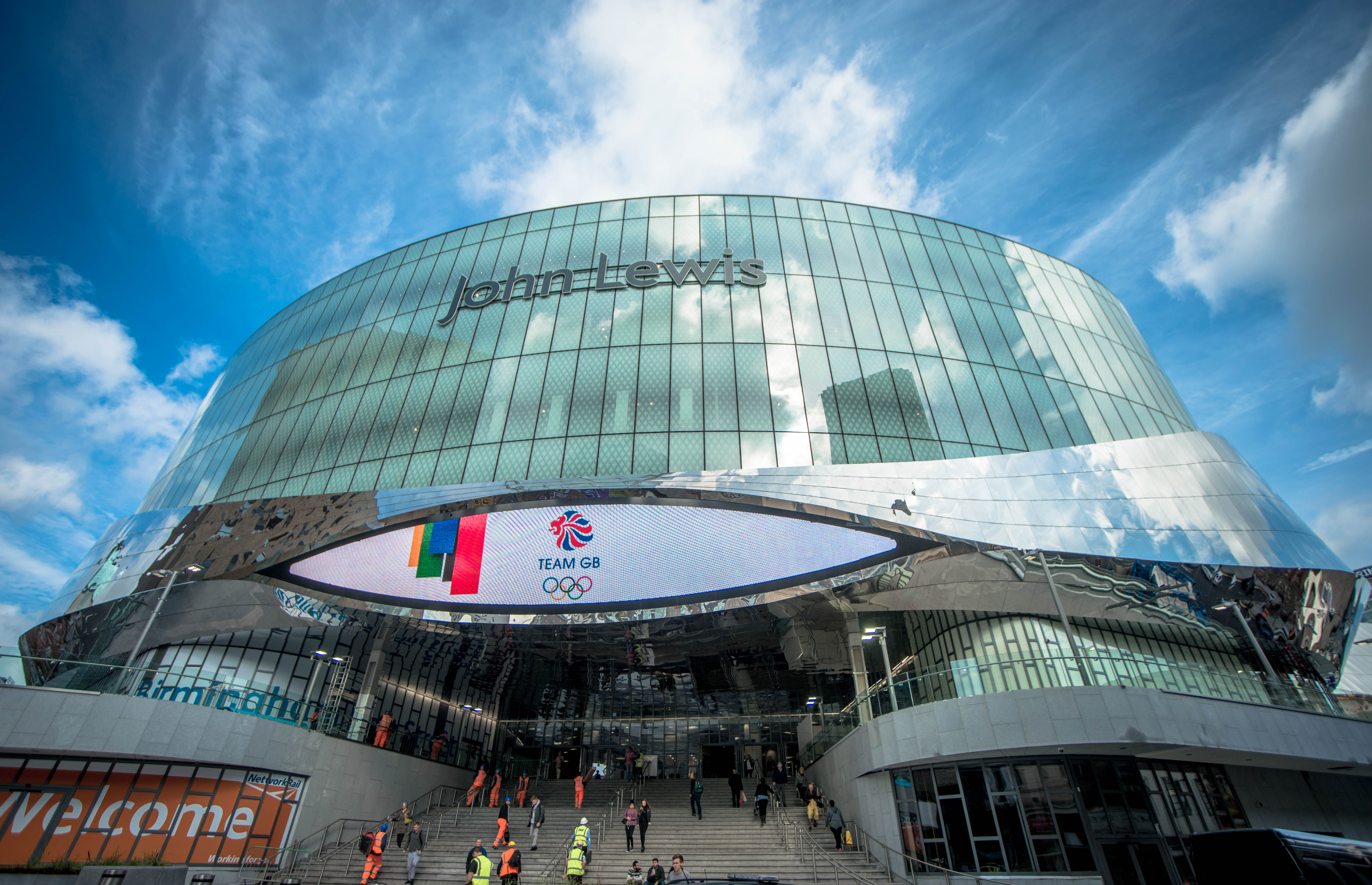
- Location: Birmingham, England
- Coordinates: 52°28′39.98″N 1°53′55.86″W
- Opened: 24 September 2015
- Developer: Network Rail
- Manager: Jonathan Cheetham
- Owner: Hammerson
- Architect: Haskoll
- Num. of stores: 62
- Num. of anchor tenants: 1 (John Lewis and Partners) (formerly)
- Floor area: c. 500,000 sq ft (46,000 m^{2})
- Floors: 1
- Parking: 450 Spaces, including 23 Disabled spaces, and 13 Parent & Child spaces
- Website: bullring.co.uk

Grand Central (formerly The Pallasades Shopping Centre, previously Birmingham Shopping Centre) is a shopping centre located above New Street railway station in Birmingham, England, that opened in 1971 as Birmingham Shopping Centre. In 1988, it was largely refurbished and reopened as The Pallasades Shopping Centre. The centre underwent a mass redevelopment in 2014, opening on 24 September 2015 as Grand Central. It was acquired by Hammerson and CPPIB from Birmingham City Council in January 2016 for £335m. When coupled with the Bullring (to which it is connected via a footbridge, branded as "LinkStreet") it forms the United Kingdom's largest city centre-based shopping centre, styled Bullring & Grand Central.

== History ==
The original centre was built in 1971 following the 1967 reconstruction of New Street Station below. It was known as the Birmingham Shopping Centre before being renamed The Pallasades.

== Redevelopment ==
As part of the New Street Station Gateway Plus redevelopment, Grand Central underwent a major overhaul, which included a six-year long programme of enabling works by a Birmingham demolition contractor, Colemans, formerly Coleman & Co. The mall has been redesigned with a Texlon ethylene tetrafluoroethylene (ETFE) atrium roof as centrepiece, and it has over 60 stores across 500,000 square feet (46,000 m^{2}) with John Lewis as the main tenant. Many of the shops, restaurants and cafés are new to the city including Cath Kidston, The White Company, Kiehls, Giraffe and Tapas Revolution. It reopened in September 2015 along with the modernised Birmingham New Street station.

The shopping centre's name is given to the adjacent tram stop that opened in May 2016.

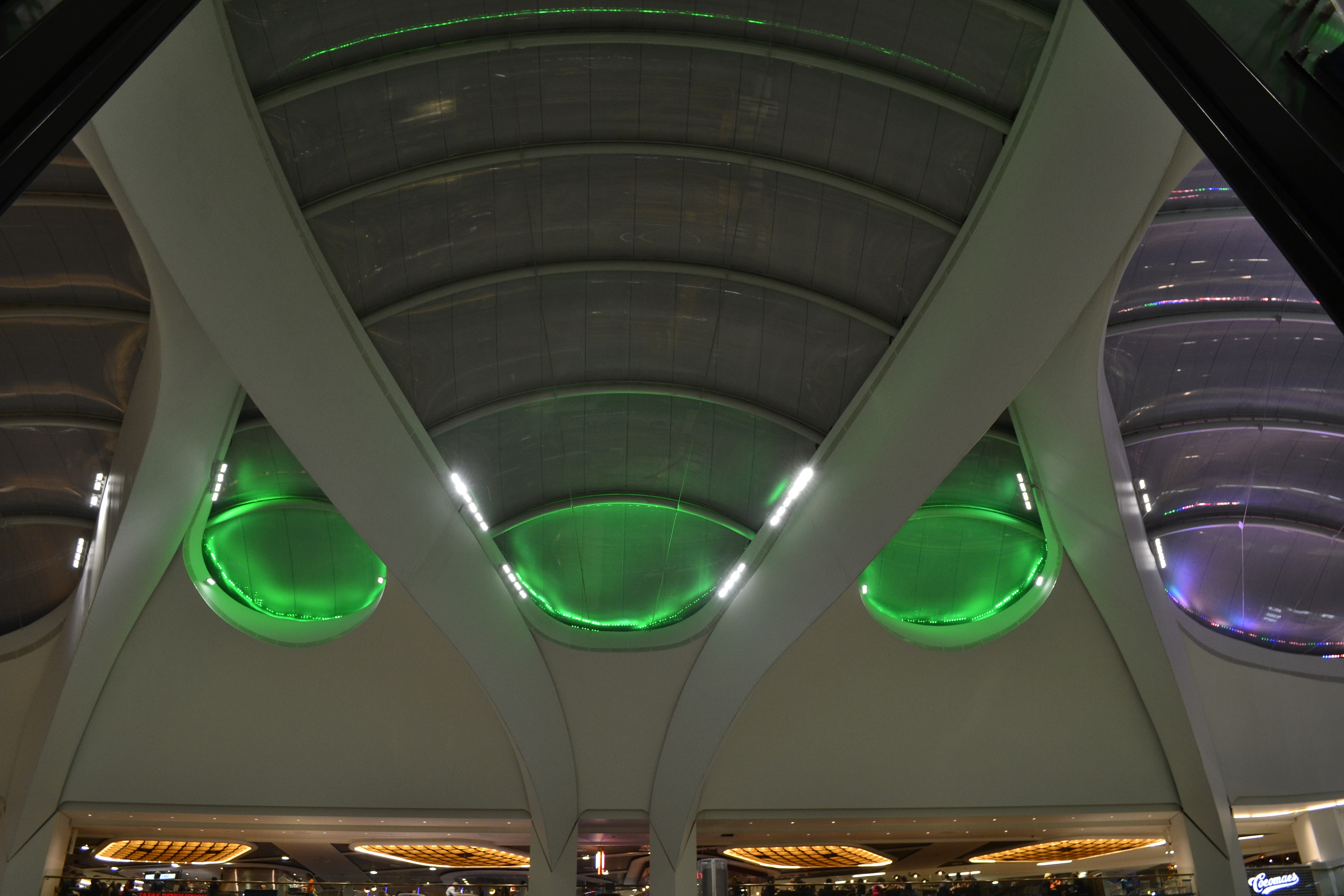
The modern architecture of the new Grand Central shopping centre

John Lewis announced in 2020 that its store would not reopen after being closed during the COVID-19 restrictions.

Grand Central was selected as a filming location for the 2023 film Mission: Impossible – Dead Reckoning Part One.
