= Gateway Plus =

2010s redevelopment scheme in Birmingham, England

Coordinates: 52°28′39.98″N 1°53′55.86″W

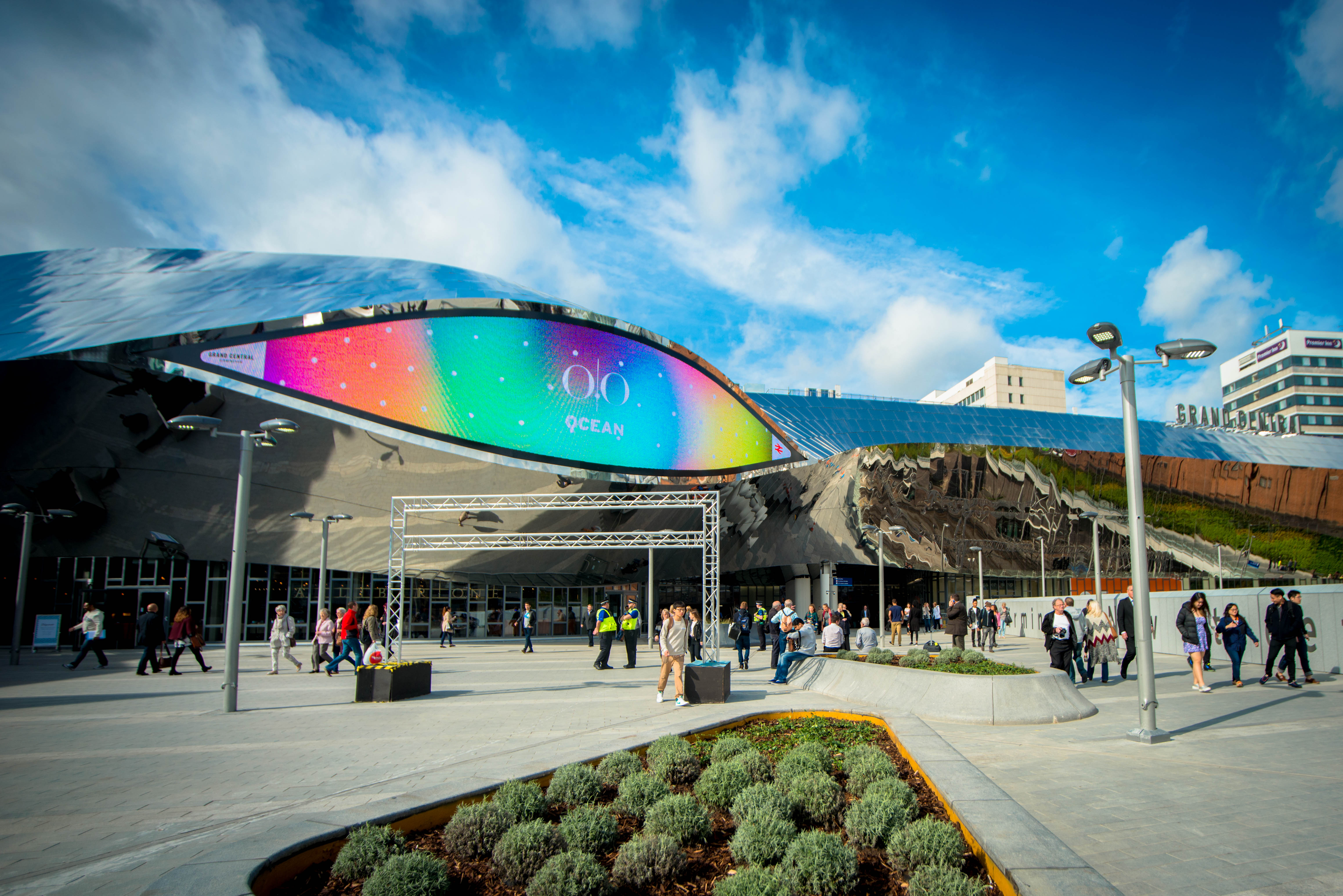
Birmingham New Street station after completion

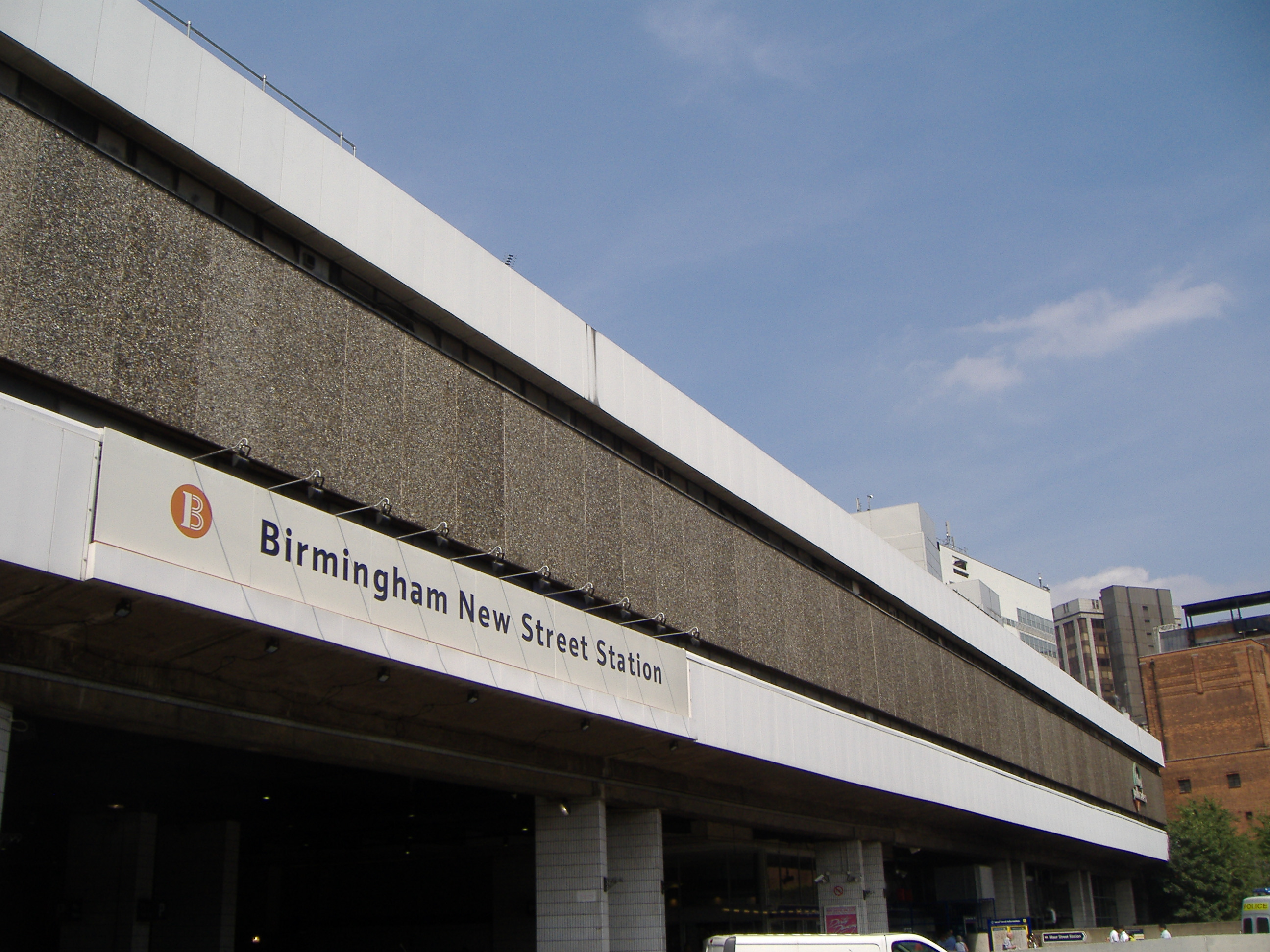
The Smallbrook Queensway elevation of New Street station

The Gateway Plus (previously known as Birmingham Gateway and now known as Grand Central) project was a redevelopment scheme that regenerated Birmingham New Street railway station and the Pallasades Shopping Centre above it in Birmingham, England. It was completed in September 2015. The project aimed to enhance the station to cope with increased passenger numbers as well as expected future growth in traffic, but did not alter the train capacity of the station. In 2008, the station handled passenger numbers far in excess of the capacity of its existing design. The current station and Pallasades Shopping Centre were completed in 1967 and became the subject of criticism for the congestion of the station and shabbiness of the shopping centre and parts of the station. It is part of the Big City Plan.

== Proposals ==
=== Circumstances (2010) ===
Birmingham New Street station was built to cater for 650 trains and 60,000 passengers per day, which was roughly the same usage it experienced when it was first constructed. It was believed that demand for rail travel would decrease. However, it now caters for 1,350 trains and over 120,000 passengers – twice its design capacity. Passenger usage of New Street has increased by 50% since 2000. It was predicted that passenger usage of the station would increase by 57% by 2020.

Between 1995 and 2005, rail passenger journeys in the West Midlands increased by about 44%, and at New Street station, passenger numbers have increased by about 53%. In the next ten years, this is expected to rise by another 28%. With the station serving more train journeys, the approach from the east, underneath the Bullring Shopping Centre, has become a bottleneck which is constrained by the foundations of the shopping centre preventing widening. Here, twelve tracks constrict to become four and this was outlined in the "Birmingham and West Midlands Rail Capacity Review" as a future capacity problem.

=== Planning history ===
The proposed design for the project was unveiled in June 2006 and in the following month, the business case had been completed. The business case had taken 18 months to produce and was created by representatives from Network Rail, Birmingham City Council, Advantage West Midlands, and the West Midlands Passenger Transport Authority (WMPTA). During July and August, Warner Estates, the owners of the Pallasades Shopping Centre, were in negotiations with the developers.

A planning application for outline planning permission was submitted on 9 August 2006 with designs and renders and the proposals were publicly welcomed by Birmingham City Council in August 2006. It was given an application number of 'C/05066/06/OUT' and the application was summarised on the city council's website as:

"Outline planning application, including the approval of access, for the major refurbishment and associated development of New Street Station and adjoining land, in connection with alterations and reconfiguration of the station facilities and comprising changes to the Pallasades Shopping Centre, the demolition of Stephenson Tower (Use Class C3), construction of two tall buildings, associated highway works, public spaces and infrastructure works (including uses A1 (retail), A3 (restaurants and cafes), A4 (drinking establishments), A5 (hot food take-away), A2 (financial and professional services) B1 (business uses including offices) C3 (residential), of the Use Classes Order (England) April 2005"

Construction was expected to begin in 2009, with Phase 1 being completed in April 2011 and Phase 2 by Spring 2013. A later report stated the entire station would be completed for the 2012 London Olympics.

In late October 2006, the developers of New Street station expressed their interest in technology being developed in Japan where the footsteps of the visitors could be used to generate electricity as well as the turnstiles which can be used to generate energy. They also expressed interest in a glass dome to allow heat to enter and heat the station.

In early November 2006, the development was faced with delays. It was first noted that the development would be decided upon in summer 2007. This came as Gisela Stuart, MP for Birmingham Edgbaston, warned that this development was vital for Birmingham. A campaign was launched for the public to pledge their support for the development by writing their name and addresses on leaflets and posting them in ballot boxes located around the station. These will be sent to the Department for Transport. If successful, the redevelopment of the station will make it into the priority list for development being drawn up by the government and was completed by Christmas 2006. The proposals received outline planning consent from Birmingham City Council's Planning Department. In December 2006, Douglas Alexander revealed that the government were aware of the need for the redevelopment of New Street station however did not reveal what was being done.

In February 2007, plans for the acquisition of Stephenson Tower through a Compulsory Purchase Order were discussed by the Cabinet.

Martin Chambers, Programme Director for New Street at Network Rail, said in June 2007 that he expects the government to approve the first payment towards the project in mid-July. He expected Network Rail to announce a £122 million package on 18 July. On top of this, a further £136 million has to be paid by the Department for Transport, and £100 million from Advantage West Midlands must be approved by the Department of Trade and Industry. This was further supported by the leader of Birmingham City Council, Mike Whitby, who is also the Chairman of the New Street Gateway Steering Committee. Separate from this, the project received more support, this time from the shadow transport minister, Julian Brazier of the Conservative party.

Following the announcement by Ruth Kelly for the £128 million funding package for New Street, it was stated that the station would be completed by 2015, later than the previous dates of 2012 and Spring 2013.

In July 2007, the council were told in a letter from the Department for Transport to find a cheaper alternative for the redevelopment project to New Street station. This resulted in speculation over whether the Government were to grant the further two tranches of funding towards the project.

==== Redesign ====
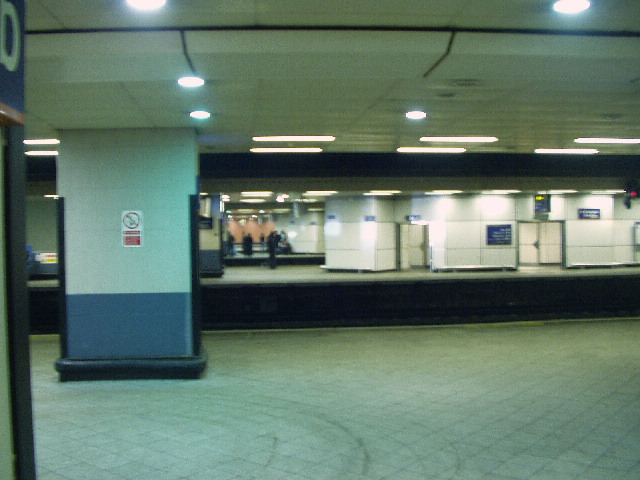
The old 1960s interior design was rationalised and revamped in the Gateway Plus project.

On 21 December 2007, Network Rail with RIBA Competitions issued a design contest notice on the Tenders Electronic Daily, supplement to the Official Journal of the European Union. The notice stated that the designs must be received by noon on 28 January 2008 with selected architects being invited to produce an architectural model on 11 February 2008. The design should include a new external façade and atrium.

On 18 February 2008, the shortlist of six architectural design practices was released:

- Rafael Viñoly
- Foreign Office Architects
- UNStudio
- LAB Architecture
- Idom UK
- CRAB Studio

The successful practice will act as concept architects, redesigning the station's exterior and creating a new atrium at a cost of about £30 million, while working alongside lead consultant Atkins and architect BDP.

On 18 September 2008, London-based Foreign Office Architects were chosen as the concept architects for the New Street redesign, and will be working on the project alongside Atkins and BDP. Their design incorporates a large atrium which will allow the new concourse to "flood with light", given that a major complaint surrounding the current station is its lack of natural light.

A reserved matters planning application was submitted for the design to Birmingham City Council on 20 November 2009. A public consultation period commenced immediately and ended on 31 December 2009. The Commission for Architecture and the Built Environment gave the project its approval in January 2010, although warned that it could be "watered down" to cut costs. The application received approval from the Planning Committee on 4 February 2010.

== Design ==
=== John McAslan design ===
Proposed land uses in outline application
Land use	Area (m^{2})
Retail	55,173
Offices	30,733
Residential	30,733

The initial design for the station was produced by John McAslan + Partners in conjunction with engineers WSP Group, who were appointed in 2005. The design submitted for outline planning approval involved the demolition and replacement of the station's existing concrete façade with a curved glass frontage. All existing entrances were to remain, with a new entrance to be installed at Station Street. The plans were to flank the entrance on Station Street with two mixed-use 130m towers, on the site of Stephenson Tower. The existing glass "arrowheads" which are located on the Navigation Street elevation at the end of the platforms were to remain. The current station consists of five escalators and two lifts serving the station however, it was proposed to increase the number of escalators to 42 and lifts to 15. The demolition of part of the Pallasades Shopping Centre would allow for the construction of a glass roof to allow natural light to reach the concourse, which will be expanded by 350% to new 10,500 m^{2}.

=== Foreign Office Architects design ===
Foreign Office Architects were appointed following an international architectural design competition managed by RIBA Competitions. Their design differed massively from that of John McAslan. As proposed in the reserved matters application of November 2009, the internal concourse will be reconfigured and enlarged so that it is 45 m (148 ft) long from east to west. The new atrium will have an area of 2,800 m^{2} (30,139 sq ft). New ticket barriers will allow passengers into one of three lounge areas. When their train arrives, they will be allowed onto the platforms to board the train. The platforms will be cleared of the existing waiting rooms and modernised. Holes will be cut in the floor of the concourse and filled with glass to allow light to pass from the concourse to platform level. The floor of the concourse will also be repaved. To allow natural light into the concourse, part of the Pallasades Shopping Centre will be demolished and three elongated glass domes will be constructed, reaching 26 m (85 ft) in height, with four glass skylights inserted between them. The interior of the concourse will be covered in seamless plaster.

The exterior will be covered in a curved, stainless steel façade, said to be inspired by Birmingham's undulating skyline, that will rise to the top of the multi-storey car park. Eye-shaped LED screens will be installed on three of the corners of the building which will provide travel information. The new entrance at Station Street, as proposed by John McAslan + Partners will remain, with the facade at street level providing additional retail units. The existing retail units will also be redeveloped.

There will also be extensive landscaping works around the station. The southern entrance at Station Street will form the main drop-off area for cars and taxis, allowing the existing drop-off area to be enclosed within the concourse. There are six voids above the railway tracks, and so as part of the proposals, the void adjacent to Queens Drive, to the east of the station, will be covered to create a new public square. A new walkway will be created from the Queens Drive entrance along the largest eastern void, around the back of the Odeon cinema to the Bull Ring. This will give visitors a direct and signed link to Birmingham Moor Street railway station. Most of the parapet walls to the voids will be redecorated with new cladding or art features, with the exception of those adjacent to the Signal Box which can only be cleaned.

The number of escalators will be increased to 31, and lifts to 16, improving connectivity between the platforms and station concourse.

=== Towers ===
The outline planning application included plans for two 130-metre (427 ft) tall mixed-use towers, flanking the Station Street entrance. The two glass towers were proposed to both be 30 storeys maximum and would be completely identical except for one tower will have a smaller footprint than the other. One tower will be residential whilst the other will be office. At least 10% of housing created within the proposed new towers would be reserved for affordable housing, below the city centre average of 15%. Earlier in 2006, there were reports of an extra 10 floors being added to the design.

When the reserved matters application was submitted in November 2009, the towers were not included and it was noted that these would be subject of a separate planning application. It was reported in August 2009, that the plans for the towers was delayed due to the economic conditions.

=== Other proposals ===
In 2005, Arup headed a campaign for a new major railway station named Birmingham Grand Central to be built in the Eastside of Birmingham, however this vision did not materialise and politicians dismissed the need for the station. Also in 2005, British architect Will Alsop produced designs for New Street station, incorporating a glass roof. The designs were then commercially validated.

Other proposals for alleviating the pressure on New Street station have also been suggested. These include the lengthening of trains, however, this has been criticised by Arup who claim that there are many stations that are unable to take trains any longer than they currently are. They used the Cross-City Line as an example, showing that stations can currently take a maximum of six carriages and that the lengthening proposals would increase train length to 12 carriages.

== Comments ==
A total of ten letters and one petition were submitted in response to the outline planning application. Three letters were in support of the planning application whilst one letter queried whether work would be carried out at night.

=== Criticism ===
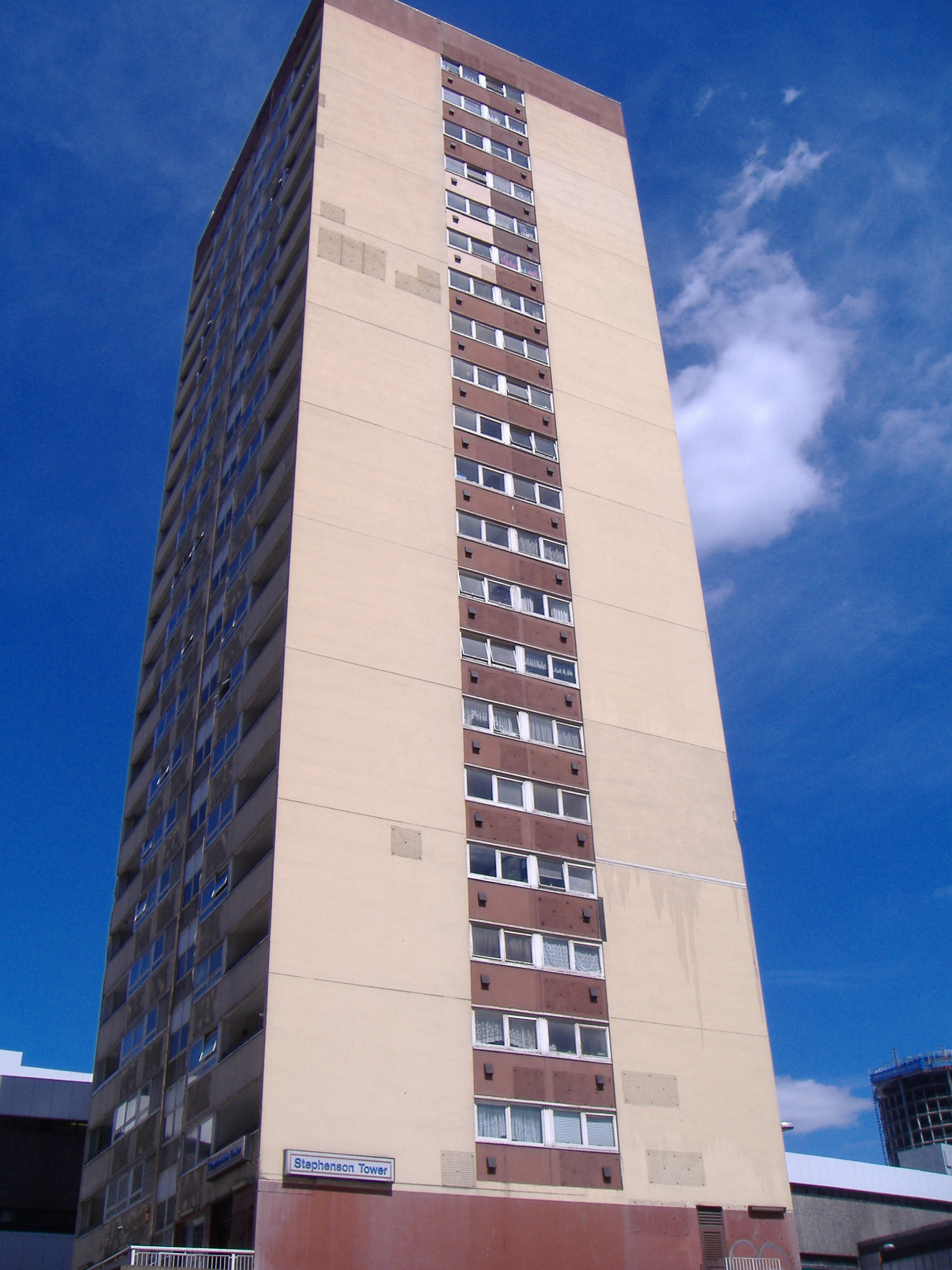
The Stephenson Tower Residents Associations raised objections to the demolition of the tower block above the station.

In February 2007, Arup called for the Birmingham Gateway proposals to be abandoned because it did not address rail capacity issues. Their report said that New Street station would reach its railway capacity by 2025 and further increases would be constrained by the bottleneck to the east of the station, where twelve tracks become four. Instead they proposed building a new "Grand Central station" to the east. This scheme was not considered by Network Rail or the government. On the Commons Transport Committee, a number of MPs raised similar concerns about railway capacity. This was reported on the BBC News Website on 21 July 2008.

Other criticisms were towards the architecture of the station. The proposals have been attacked by councillors and planners who considered the designs to be of poor architectural quality and disputed whether the two towers were iconic enough. The reply from the architects were that the designs presented were only initial ideas.

=== Objections ===
Objections to the proposed twin towers were raised by the residents of Stephenson Tower, under the name "Stephenson Tower Residents Association" on the outline planning application. The group submitted a petition regarding the planning application. Stephenson Tower, a 20-storey tower block on New Street station, will be served with a compulsory purchase order and demolished as part of the project as one of the towers will partially cover the footprint of the building. The tower is on a long lease and administered by the City Council, with Network Rail having the freehold.

Turley Associates wrote on behalf of Agora (Warner Estates) who are the leasehold owners of the Pallasades and car park which is sub-leased to National Car Parks. They were supportive of the principle of the development, however, feel the proposal should be amended to mitigate the loss of value on the shopping centre, improve pedestrian connectivity; reduce the scale of the void proposed within the shopping centre to provide direct pedestrian connections and provide additional retail floorspace. Therefore, they objected to the proposal at this stage. Donaldsons LLP, who were writing on behalf of the Birmingham Alliance, also responded with a holding objection to the proposals as concern has been raised in respect of the moving of the escalators which lead from the concourse level to the Pallasades Shopping Centre. They were also concerned over the work made to the entrance at Smallbrook Queensway. Savilles, on behalf of BT, lodged a holding objection on the basis that their facility on Hill Street is a sensitive location. It contains a significant amount of equipment which would be sensitive to dust. Much of this equipment is behind louvres, and could therefore be subject to dust, particularly through the construction period.

=== Support ===
Despite the criticism, the plans have also received considerable support. From the political spectrum, the project has received support from Tony Blair, the Conservative Party and from Gisela Stuart, MP for Birmingham Edgbaston, who said:

"The proposed redevelopment would not only be a catalyst for regional growth and development but offer an excellent return on necessary investment."

In response to the planning application, English Heritage welcomed the proposals as it promises greater integration of the station into patterns of pedestrian flow around the city centre, and therefore benefit the appreciation of Birmingham's historic environment. The Conservation and Heritage Panel of Birmingham City Council echoed this as well as stressing the need for high quality design.

== Funding ==
The redevelopment project cost £750 million. The financing for the project depends upon a mixture of public and private funding. Private funding will account for £150 million whilst the rest will be publicly funded. The four key funding partners for the project are:

- Network Rail
- Birmingham City Council
- Advantage West Midlands
- Centro

In May 2006, outline funding applications were submitted to Government agencies including the Department for Transport. Gateway Plus has been subject to uncertainty in funding, a problem Mike Whitby claimed to have been responsible for removing in early October 2006. However, a report later said that the financial part of the project had already been secured before he came to power as the leader of Birmingham City Council.

In March 2007, Birmingham City Council was given an additional £40 million by the Government after they described the West Midlands Local Transport Plan being scored as "excellent". £3 million of this was put towards the Gateway Plus project. A£128 million funding package was announced by British Government for the Gateway Plus project in July 2007. It was announced by Ruth Kelly, the Transport Secretary, when she unveiled a government White Paper Delivering a Sustainable Railway, which also includes the upgrading of 150 further stations. This is the first of three tranches of funding required for the development. The other two tranches of funding total £223 million.

In October 2007, it was reported by the Birmingham Mail that the Comprehensive Spending Review by Alistair Darling would confirm the remaining funding for Gateway Plus. This came as concerns were raised that the government would refuse to provide the remaining tranches of funding. However, Alistair Darling failed to mention the project in his Pre-Budget Speech to the House of Commons, instead mentioning the Crossrail project for the South East of England, provoking fury among business leaders who accused Prime Minister Gordon Brown of dithering. Rod Ackrill, President of the Birmingham Chamber of Commerce and group chairman of developer Chase Midland, demanded the government to provide the necessary funding for the project and said he expected a decision by Christmas Day, 2007.

On 12 February 2008, Secretary of State for Transport Ruth Kelly announced that the Department for Transport will be providing £160 million on top of the £128 million that is to be provided through the railway White Paper. A further £100 million will be provided by the Department for Business Enterprise and Regulatory Reform and will be channelled through Advantage West Midlands, the regional development agency. The announcement brought the total amount of Government spending on the project to £388 million.

In total, £100 million will be given by Advantage West Midlands, £288 million from the Department of Transport, £100 million from the Department for Business Enterprise and Regulatory Reform, £128 million from Network Rail and £10 million from Centro. There will be additional funding from the private sector. Network Rail is also investing £350 million in renewing the signalling systems through New Street station and the West Midlands over the next ten years.

The Chancellor George Osborne confirmed in his June 2010 budget that central government funding for the redevelopment would still be provided despite the economic downturn.

== Project management ==
The project has been split into two phases since its approval in 2003. The New Street Gateway Steering Committee, chaired by Mike Whitby, is a committee dedicated to getting the plans to materialise. The council's project manager for Gateway Plus is David Pywell, who was also the Strategic Director of Development for Birmingham City Council before retiring in September 2006. Network Rail announced in 2005 that it will be setting up an entrepreneurial team that will work with developers and investors working on the project. In April 2009, Network Rail announced that Chris Montgomery had been appointed as managing director of the project.

Atkins is the lead consultant on the project and Mace Group will be providing construction and logistics management, which will involve monitoring of track possessions, night working and the placement of hoardings for minimum disruption, as well as being the principal contractor.

== Impact ==
It is claimed that the redevelopment of the station would result in £2.3 billion being invested into the West Midlands region. The redevelopment of New Street is expected to accommodate passenger growth to at least 2046, depending on the accuracy of the growth predictions. Between 2,200 and 3,200 permanent jobs will be created as a result of the redevelopment with further jobs being created during the construction work at the station. The new station will be an improved transport destination for tourists and is a key part of the redevelopment of Birmingham by improving the city image.

== Images of the station's architectural history ==
=== Images of the pre-1960s era station ===
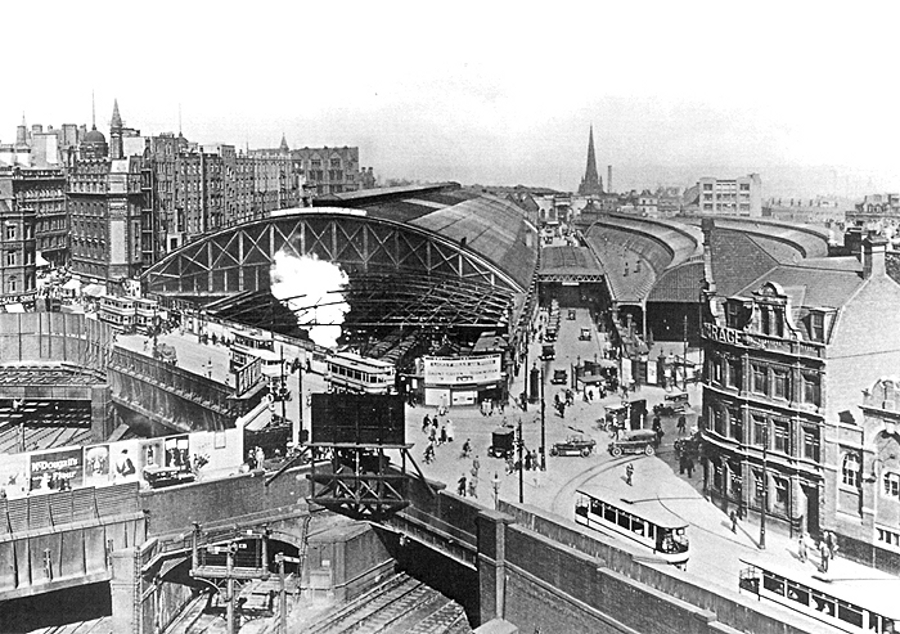
The station looking east from Brunel Street

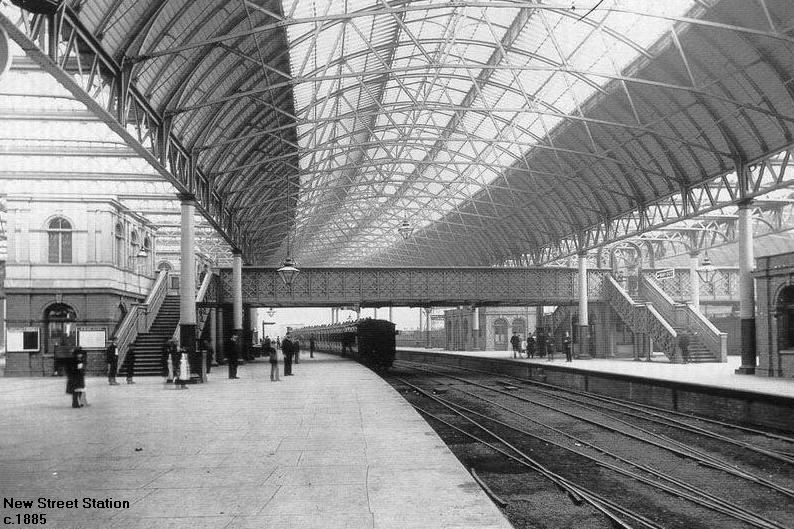
The station in 1885

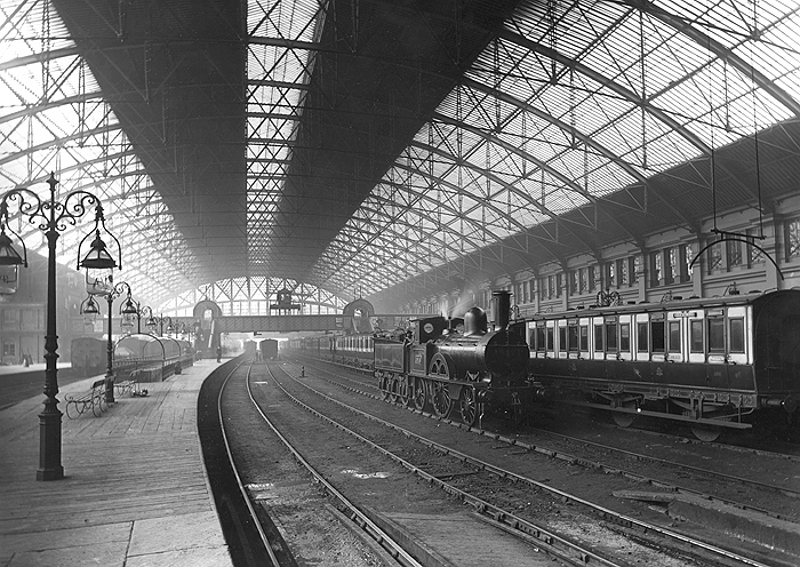
The station in 1885. Note the signal box on the passenger footbridge which controlled movements in station.

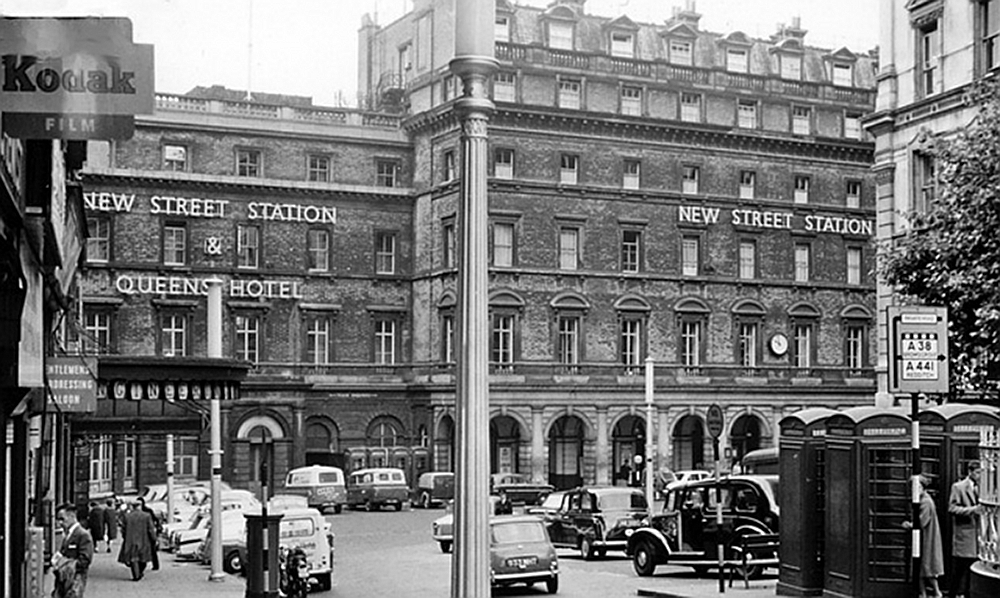
The former entrance off Stephenson Plac

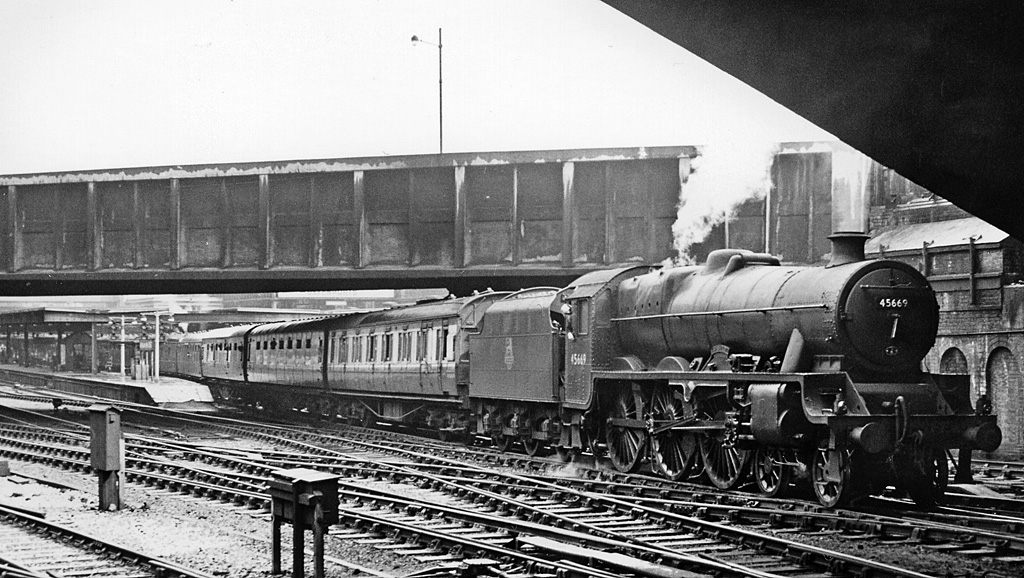
A scene from 1957

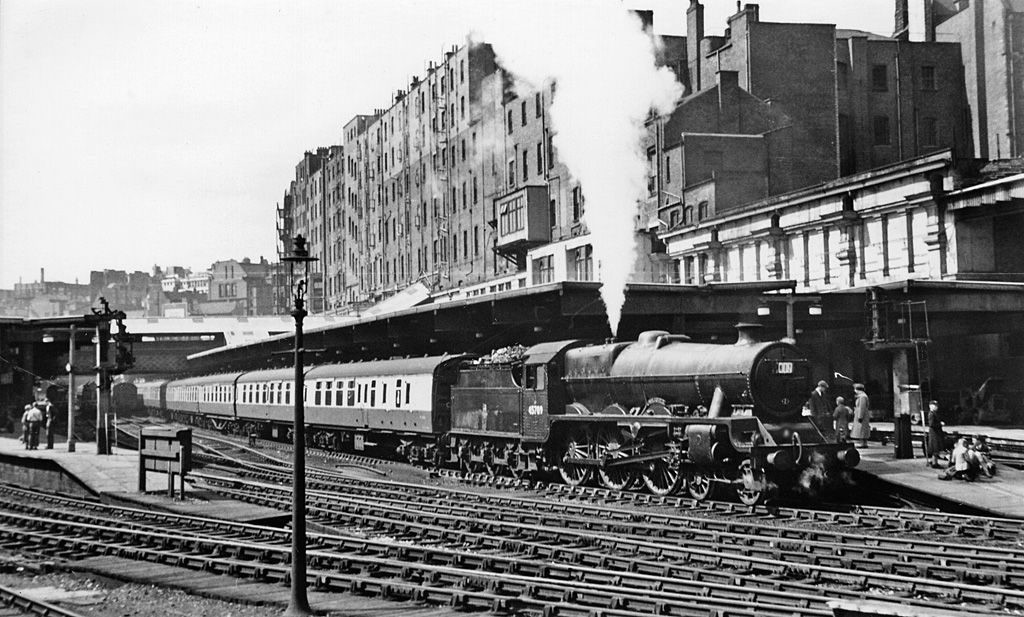
A scene from 1956

=== Images of the 1960s-era station ===
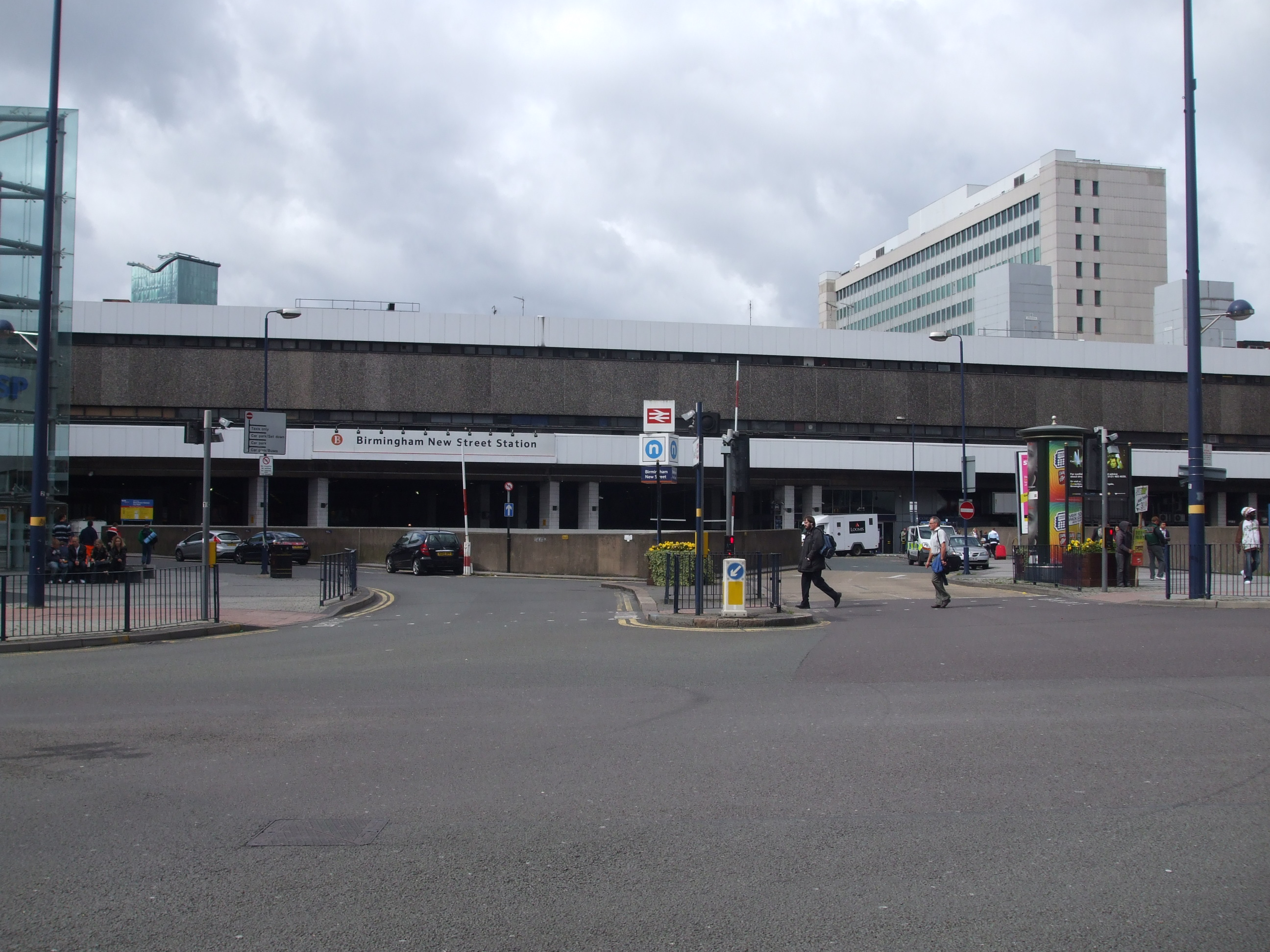
The station at street level

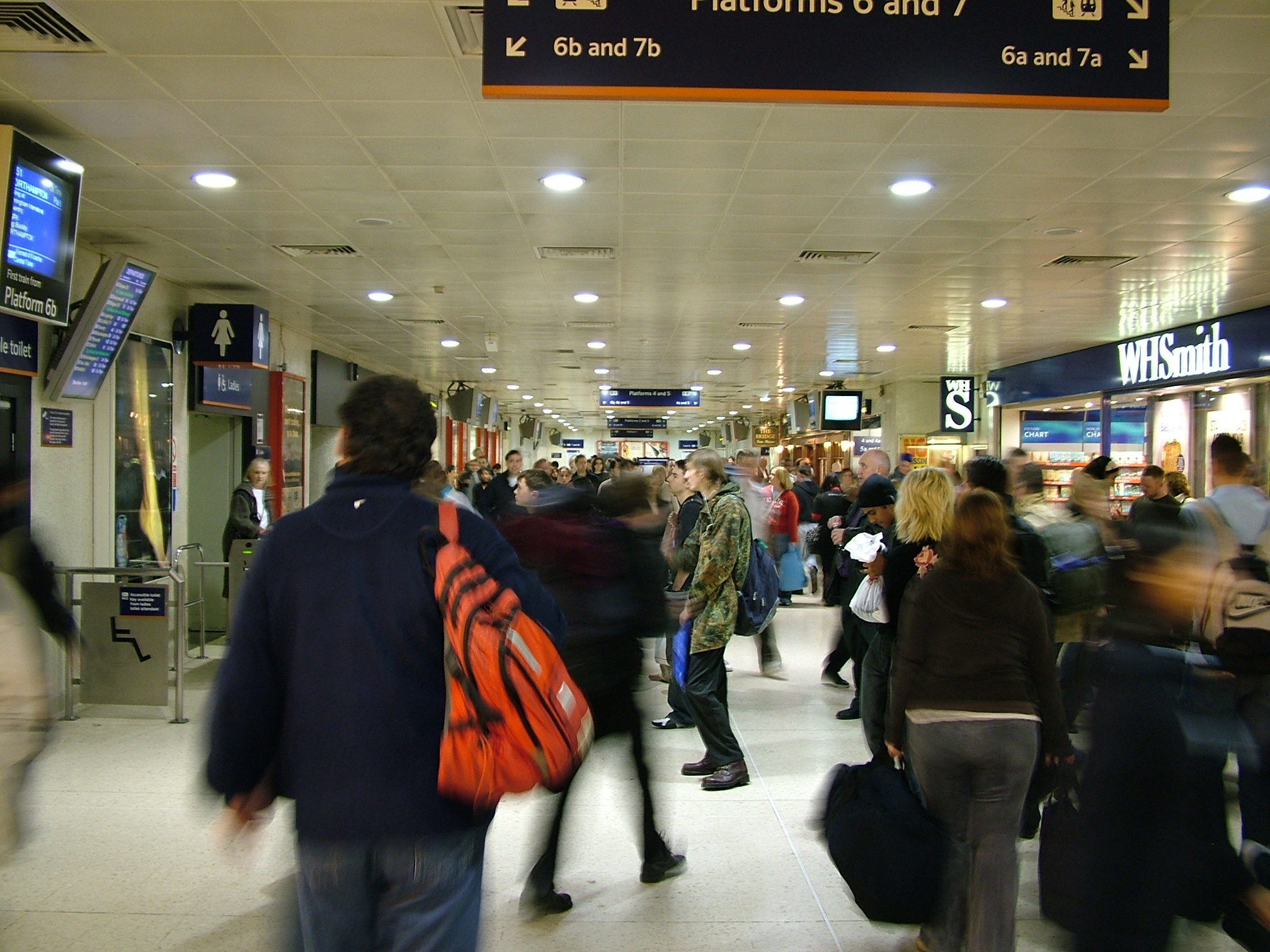
The station concourse

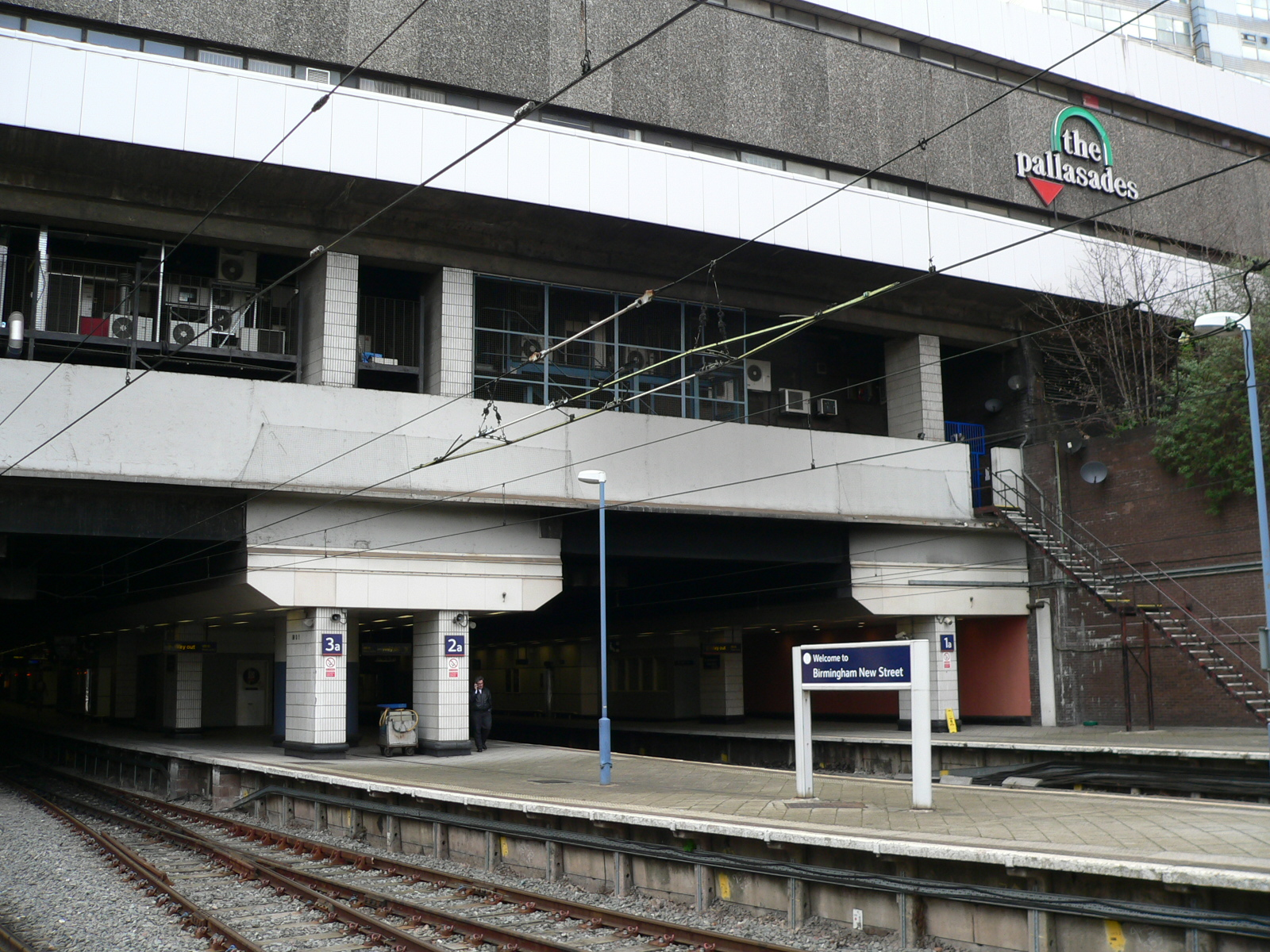
The utilitarian 1960s architecture will be covered up

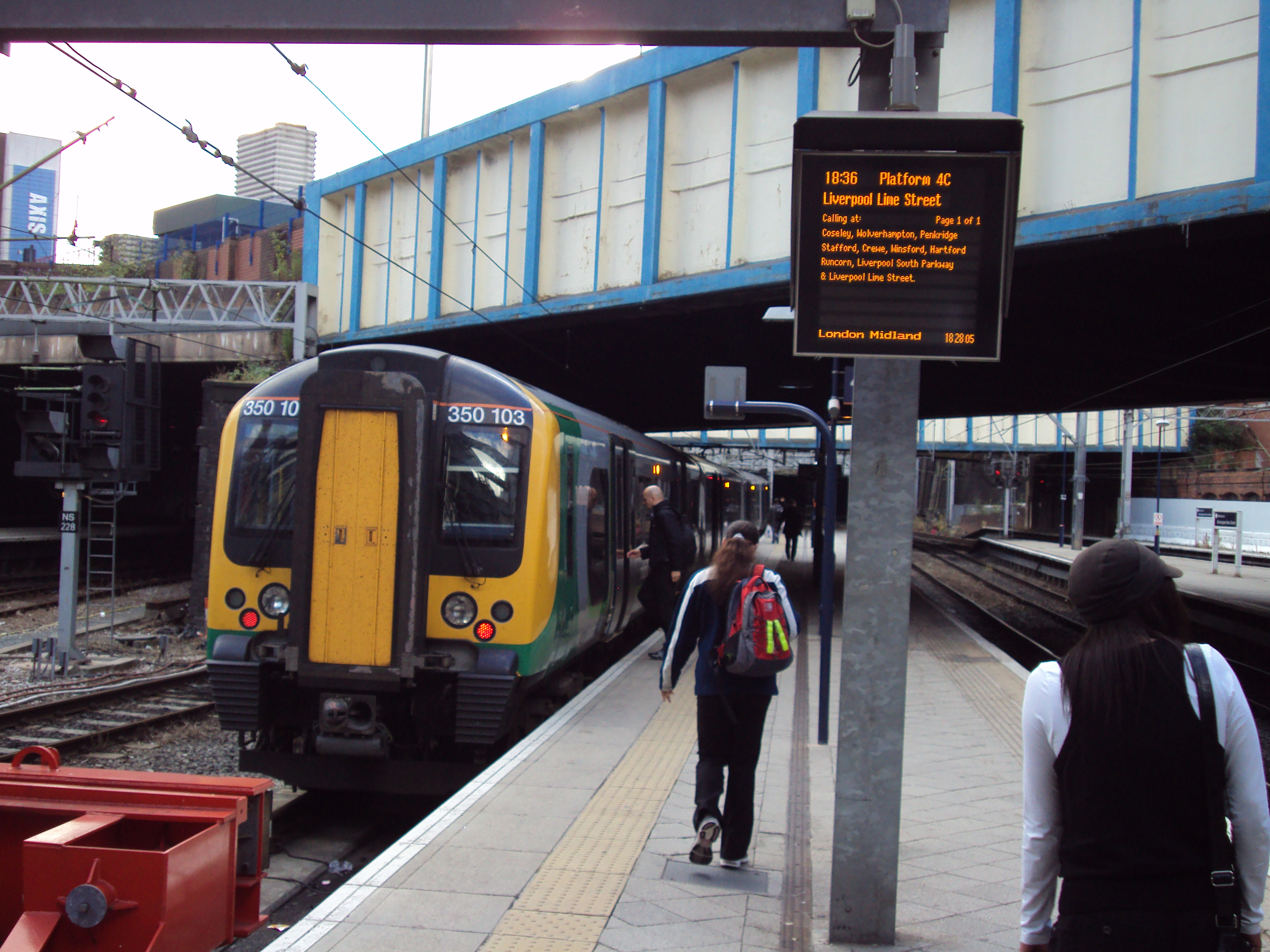
Bay platform 4C was built in the early 2000s to reduce overcrowding on existing platforms

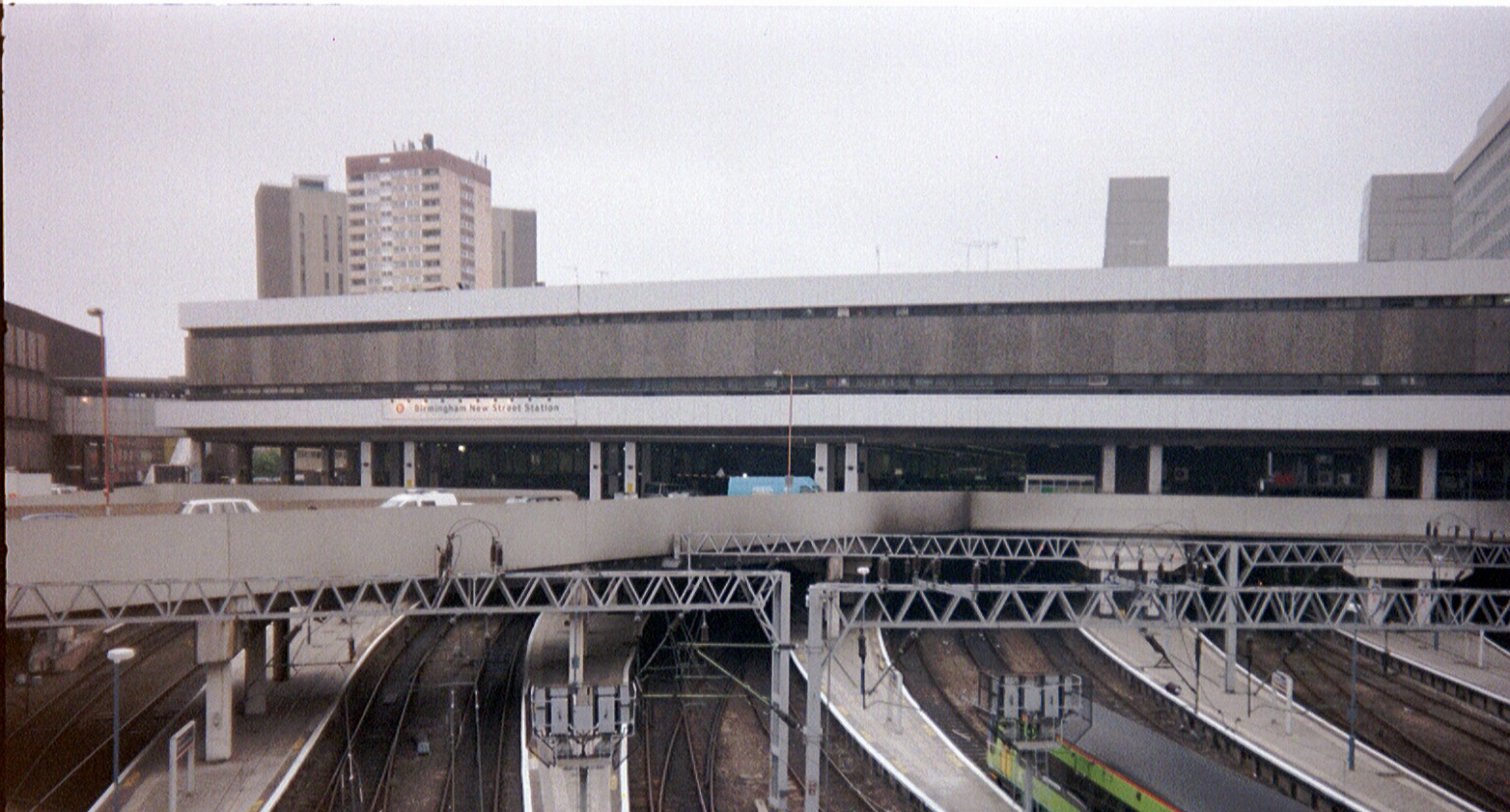
The utilitarian 1960s architecture will be covered up

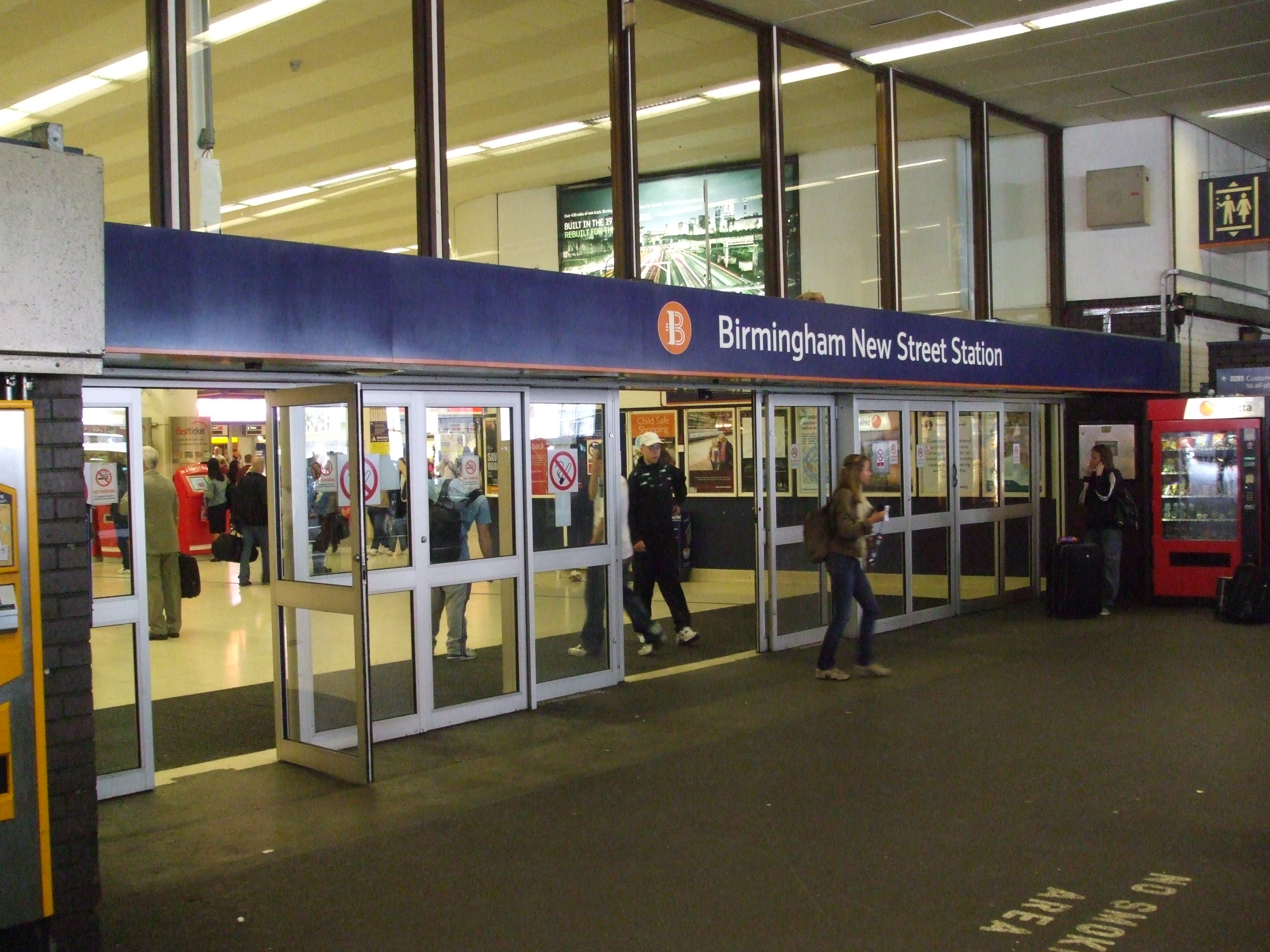
Birmingham New Street station's eastern entrance in 2009

=== Artists impressions of the new era station ===
The avant-garde exterior of the approved redevelopment

The station as viewed from Stephenson Street
