= Foreign Office Architects =

Architectural Design Studio

Foreign Office Architects, FOA, was an architectural design studio headed by former husband and wife team Farshid Moussavi and Alejandro Zaera-Polo. The London-based studio, which was established in 1993, specialised in architectural design, master planning and interior design services for both public and private sector clients. Following the end of the couple's marriage, the winding up of the studio's activities was announced in December 2009. The establishment of two new practices, FMA (Farshid Moussavi Architecture) and London/Barcelona based AZPA Limited followed in 2011.

== History ==
The "Foreign" in the company's name referred to the principal's' heritage, with Zaera–Polo hailing from Spain and Moussavi from Iran. The company produced architectural projects in Japan, the United States, the Netherlands and Spain.

FOA emerged as one of the most significant architecture and urban design practices of its time, and became known for combining technical innovation with design excellence. FOA's designers were critically acclaimed, and won several awards. In their approach to architecture, the designers were hailed as new pragmatists, employing technical rigor in their focus on organic growth and the evolution of design ‘species’ hybridizing uses relating to both local and global conditions. Their work addressed a variety of locations and typologies.

The studio's first project, which is considered its landmark achievement, was the Yokohama Pier Port Terminal in Japan. The Terminal has been described as a hybrid of non-Cartesian industrial infrastructure and versatile social functionality. The commission was awarded after an international competition held in 1995; the terminal was completed in 2002.

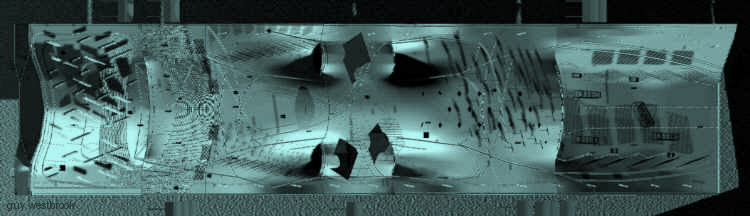
Yokohama Pier microstation model - isometric rendering by Guy Westbrook

== Work ==
In the UK:

Years of build	Year completed	Name	Type	Location	Notes
2003–2007	Not completed	Trinity EC3 office complex	Office complex	London, England	
	2008	John Lewis	Department store and Cineplex	Shires West Development, Leicester, England	
2009	Not completed	Maggie’s Centre	for cancer patients	Newcastle upon Tyne, England	This location was not completed by FOA due to budgetary issues and a change in site location.
	2010	Ravensbourne College of Design and Communication	Campus building	Greenwich Peninsula, London, England	
		West Quay retail centre	Mixed-use extension building	Southampton, England	
		Sevenstone Quarter	Mixed-use complex	Sheffield, England	
		Hadspen Garden		Somerset, England	
2008	Not completed	Euston Station	Redevelopment of a railway station	London, England	Worked with Allies and Morrison, but this location was not completed.

In Spain: (where FOA maintained a local office branch)

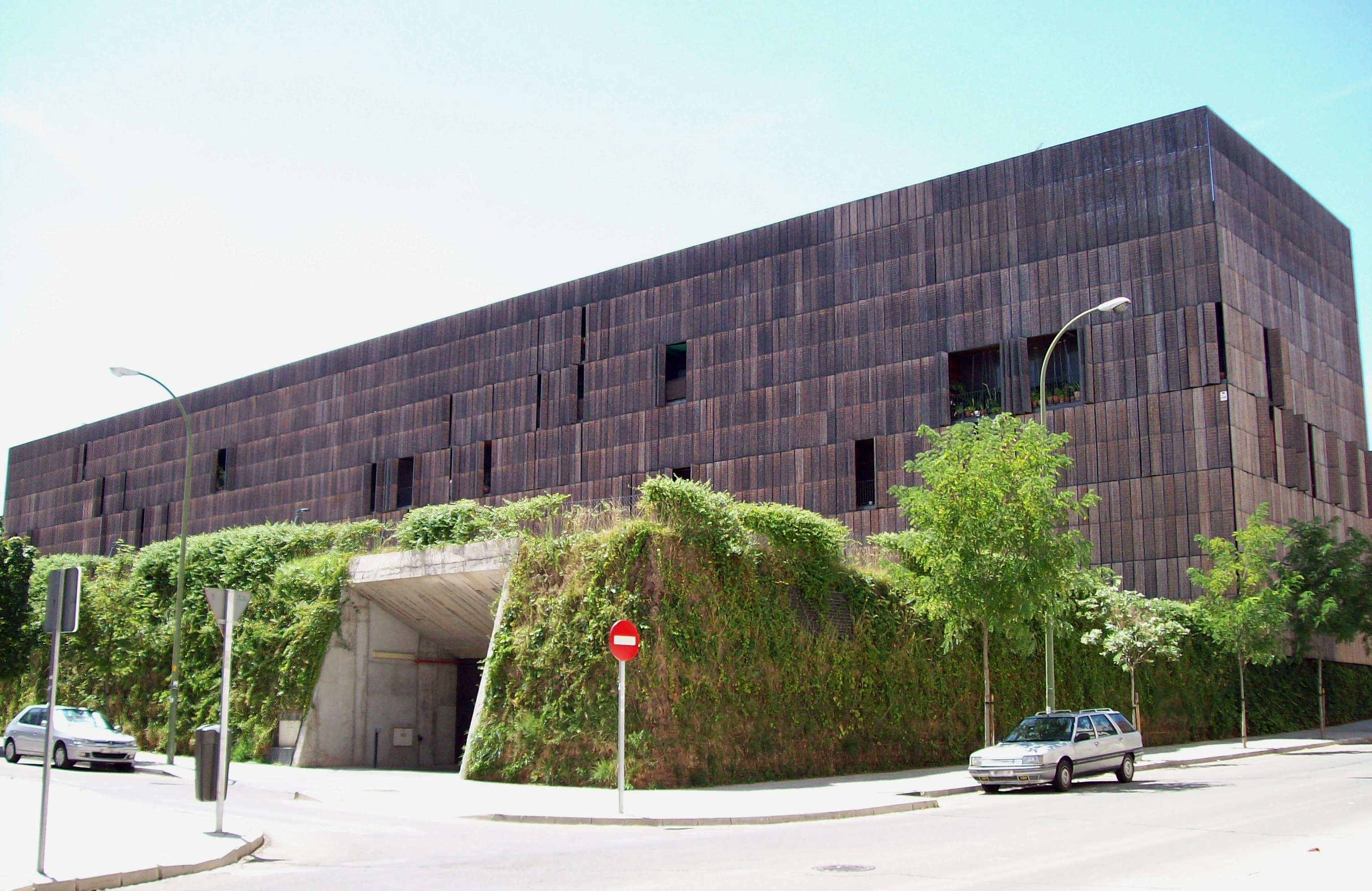
Bamboo Building (Madrid, 2007)

- the La Rioja Technology Transfer Center, Logrono
- Bamboo Building, a social housing in Madrid
- A 50,000m2 coastal park with outdoor auditoria in Barcelona
- Police headquarters in La Villajoyosa
- Municipal Theatre in Torrevieja
- The Institute of Legal Medicine in Madrid
- The D-38 Office Complex in Barcelona
- A Villa in Pedralbes, Barcelona
- The Hotel Masaveu in Gijón
- A Residential Tower in Durango

Projects in other European locations:

- The Blue Moon Hotel in Groningen, the Netherlands
- The Umraniye Retail Complex and Multiplex, in Istanbul, Turkey
- The Mahler 4 office building in Amsterdam
- The future Aerospace Campus in Toulouse, France

Projects in Asia:

- The Spanish Pavilion at the 2005 Aichi International Expo in Japan
- A headquarters building for Dulnyouk Publishers, Paju, South Korea
- Two 180m high residential towers at the World Business Centre in Busan, South Korea
- The KL Sentral Plot D Residential Towers in Kuala Lumpur, Malaysia

In the USA:

- The Museum of Contemporary Art in Cleveland, Ohio, United States

FOA won several prestigious competitions and commissions, including the BBC Music Box for the firm’s White City complex in 2003. The practice played a central creative role in the Masterplanning team for the London 2012 Olympics Park, site-wide infrastructure and accompanying long-term regeneration of the Lower Lea Valley (2002–2007) and was selected as part of the United Architects team to submit a design for the World Trade Center in New York in 2002, in the aftermath of 9/11.

== Awards ==
Year	Award name	To	By	For	Notes
2003	Kanagawa Prize for Architecture in Japan	Foreign Office Architects			
2004	Enric Miralles Prize for Architecture	Foreign Office Architects		Yokohama International Passenger Terminal	
2004	RIBA International Award	Foreign Office Architects	Royal Institute of British Architects (RIBA)		
2004	Lion Award for Topography	Foreign Office Architects	9th Venice Architecture Biennale		
2005	Charles Jencks Award for Architecture	Foreign Office Architects			
2005	RIBA International Award	Foreign Office Architects	Royal Institute of British Architects (RIBA)		
2006	RIBA International Award	Foreign Office Architects	Royal Institute of British Architects (RIBA)		
2008	RIBA European Award	Foreign Office Architects	Royal Institute of British Architects (RIBA)	Carabanchel Social Housing, Madrid, Spain	
2008	European Business Award for the Environment	Foreign Office Architects			
2008	Urban Land Institute Award for Excellence	Foreign Office Architects			
2009	RIBA National Award	Foreign Office Architects	Royal Institute of British Architects (RIBA)		
2010	Civic Trust Award	Foreign Office Architects	Civic Trust	St Malachy's Church, Belfast restoration	
2010	International Council of Shopping Centres Award	Foreign Office Architects			
2011	RIBA Award in the education and community category	Foreign Office Architects	Royal Institute of British Architects (RIBA)	Ravensbourne campus	

- Architects of the Year Award by Architectural Digest Magazine in Madrid.

== Exhibitions ==
- FOA Yokohama International Port Terminal, Architectural Association, London, 1–24 June 1995
- Solo exhibition at the 8th Venice Architecture Biennale in 2002
- FOA Breeding Architecture, ICA, London, 29 November 2003 – 28 February 2004
- FOA Designing Modern Britain, Design Museum, 2006
- FOA projects have been exhibited at the Museum of Modern Art in New York and at the Max Protetch Gallery.
