= List of museums in Cleveland =

This is a list of museums in Cleveland and non-profit and university art galleries.

See also List of museums in Ohio for other museums in Cuyahoga County, Ohio and the rest of the state.

== Museums ==
Name	Neighborhood	Type	Summary
A Christmas Story House	Tremont	Media	Museum about and house used for the film A Christmas Story
African American Museum	Hough	African American	Currently closed
ARTneo	Detroit–Shoreway	Art	website, exhibitions of Northeast Ohio art and architecture of Cleveland and the surrounding region
Artists Archives of the Western Reserve	University Circle	Art	website, Ohio art gallery and research facility
Baseball Heritage Museum	Hough	Sports	website, multicultural heritage of baseball and the values it represents
Buckland Museum of Witchcraft & Magick	Old Brooklyn	History	website, historic artifacts of witchcraft, magick, and occultism
Children's Museum of Cleveland	Goodrich–Kirtland Park	Children's	
Cleveland Grays Armory Museum	Downtown Cleveland	Military	History of the Cleveland Grays, a private military company which was founded in 1837, and the military heritage of Greater Cleveland
Cleveland History Center	University Circle	Multiple	Operated by the Western Reserve Historical Society, history of Northeast Ohio, includes the Euclid Beach Park Grand Carousel, Bingham-Hanna Mansion, Hay-McKinney Mansion, Crawford Auto-Aviation Museum, Chisholm Halle Costume Wing, and Kidzibits Family Hands-On Gallery
Cleveland Hungarian Museum	Downtown Cleveland	Ethnic - Hungarian American	History of Hungarians in Northeast Ohio
Cleveland Museum of Art	University Circle	Art	Collections include Chinese, African, Ancient Greek and Roman art, European art, Textiles & Islamic art, American painting & sculpture, Contemporary art, Medieval art, Decorative art & design, Pre-Columbian and Native North American art, Japanese & Korean art, Indian & Southeast Asian art, and Photography
Cleveland Museum of Natural History	University Circle	Natural history	Animal mounts, skeletons, dinosaurs and fossils, minerals
Cleveland Police Museum	Downtown Cleveland	Law enforcement	Located on the first floor of the Cleveland Police Headquarters Building in the Justice Center. http://www.clevelandpolicemuseum.org/
Cleveland State University Art Galleries	Downtown Cleveland	Art	Located in the Cowell & Hubbard Building
Cozad-Bates House Interpretive Center	University Circle	History	Anti-slavery reflections for the Underground Railroad codename "Hope"
Dittrick Museum of Medical History	University Circle	Science - medicine	History of medicine, experience of individuals and society as they grappled with changing conceptions of health and medicine
Dunham Tavern Museum	Central	Historic house	Mid 19th-century tavern, oldest building in the city
Great Lakes Science Center	Downtown Cleveland	Science	Includes the NASA Glenn Visitor Center
Greater Cleveland Aquarium	Downtown Cleveland	Natural history	
Historical Society of Old Brooklyn Museum	Old Brooklyn	Local history	website
International Women's Air & Space Museum	Downtown Cleveland	Aviation	History of women in aviation and space, located at Cleveland Burke Lakefront Airport
Italian American Museum of Cleveland	Little Italy	Ethnic - Italian American	History of Italians in Northeast Ohio
Learning Center and Money Museum	Downtown Cleveland	Numismatic	Part of Federal Reserve Bank of Cleveland
Louis Stokes Museum	Central	Biographical	Located at Outhwaite Homes, life of politician Louis Stokes
Museum of Contemporary Art Cleveland	University Circle	Art	Contemporary art
NASA Glenn Visitor Center	Downtown Cleveland	Aerospace	Features exhibits about NASA, space exploration and the Solar System, part of the Great Lakes Science Center
Polish-American Cultural Center of Cleveland	Broadway–Slavic Village	Ethnic	website
Reinberger Galleries	University Circle	Art	Part of the Cleveland Institute of Art
Rock and Roll Hall of Fame	Downtown Cleveland	Hall of fame - Music	
Sculpture Center	University Circle	Art	website, gGallery for sculpture
Slovenian Museum & Archives	St. Clair - Superior	Ethnic	Slovenian Museum
SPACES Gallery	Ohio City	Art	website, contemporary art
Steamship William G. Mather Maritime Museum	Downtown Cleveland	Museum ship	Retired Great Lakes bulk freighter
Temple Museum of Religious Art	University Circle	Jewish	Three locations
Transformer Station	Ohio City	Art	website, contemporary art
Ukrainian Museum-Archives	Tremont	Ethnic - Ukrainian American	
USS Cod	Downtown Cleveland	Museum ship - Military	World War II Fleet Submarine

== Defunct museums ==
- Cleveland Health Museum, AKA HealthSpace Cleveland, merged in 2007 with the Cleveland Museum of Natural History
- Lake Shore Electric Railway
- Little Italy Heritage Museum, closed in 2007
- Mill Creek Falls History Center, operated by the Slavic Village Historical Society

== See also ==
- List of museums in the United States
