= Una =

Una and UNA may refer to:

== People ==
- Una (given name), including a list of people and fictional characters with the name

== Arts and entertainment ==
- Una (film), a 2016 drama
- Una, a 1981 novel by Momo Kapor
- The Una, a woman's rights magazine, launched 1853
- "Una" (song), by Sponge Cola, 2004

== Rivers ==
- Una (Sava), a river in Bosnia and Croatia, tributary to Sava
- Una River (Pernambuco), in northeastern Brazil
- Una River (Paraíba), in northeastern Brazil
- In Bahia, eastern Brazil:
  - Una River (Itaete, Bahia), a tributary of the Paraguaçu River
  - Una River (Una, Bahia), a river that flows past the municipality of Una and empties into the Atlantic Ocean
  - Una River (Valença, Bahia), a river that flows past the municipality of Valença and empties into the Atlantic Ocean
- Una River (Rio de Janeiro), in southeastern Brazil
- D'Una River, Santa Caterina, Brazil
- Una da Aldeia River, São Paulo, Brazil

== Places ==
- Una, Republic of Dagestan
- Una, Bahia, Brazil
- Una, Himachal Pradesh, India
  - Una district
  - Una, Himachal Pradesh Assembly constituency
  - Una Himachal railway station
- Una, Gujarat, India
  - Una, Gujarat Assembly constituency
- Una, Mississippi, United States
- Uña, Castile-La Mancha, Spain
- Una National Park, Bosnia and Herzegovina
- 160 Una, an asteroid named after the Faerie Queene character

== Businesses and organisations ==
=== Political groups ===
- United for a New Alternative, Argentina
- United Nationalist Alliance, Philippines
- United Nationalities Alliance, Myanmar
- United Negros Alliance, Philippines

=== Universities ===
- Universidad Nacional de las Artes, Argentina
- Universidad Nacional de Asunción, Paraguay
- University of North Alabama, United States
- University of the Netherlands Antilles, now the University of Curaçao

=== Other businesses and organisations ===
- UNA Hotels & Resorts, an Italian hotel chain
- United Nations Association, a non-governmental organization
- United Nurses Association, an Indian professional association
- Ukrainian National Association, a North American fraternal organization

== Military uses ==
- Una-class submarine, a class of Yugoslav midget submarines
- Ukrainian People's Army, or Ukrainian National Army, 1917–1921
- Ukrainian National Army, 1945

== Other uses ==
- Una (butterfly), a genus of butterflies
- Una language, or goliath, a Papuan language
- Una (ship), 1890 built ship that operated in England, Australia and South Africa
- Una virus, a virus species
- VV UNA, a Dutch football club
- una-, a proposed SI unit prefix standing for 10^{33}

== See also ==
- Una Assembly constituency (disambiguation)
- Una-Una, Indonesia, an island
- Hunna, a French saint
- Oona, a given name
- Oonagh, a given name
- Uma (disambiguation)
- Yuna (disambiguation)
- Unas (disambiguation)
