= Uma (given name) =

Uma is a given name in various cultures.

In India, it is the name of the Hindu goddess, who is more commonly known as Parvati. In Sanskrit the word umā can further mean "tranquillity", "splendour", "fame" and "night".

== People with the name ==
- Uma (actress) (Uma Shankari, fl from 2000), Indian actress
- Uma Bharti (born 1959), Indian politician
- Uma Chowdhry (born 1957), American chemist
- Uma Devi Khatri (1923–2003), or Tun Tun, Indian actor and comedienne
- Uma Khouny, Israeli-Filipino contestant in Pinoy Big Brother
- Uma Krishnaswami (born 1956), Indian author
- Uma Kumaran, British politician
- Uma Narayan (fl. from 1990), Indian Scholar
- Uma Pemmaraju (1958–2022), Indian–American news anchor
- Uma Sharma (born 1942), kathak dancer and choreographer
- Uma Thurman (born 1970), American actress

== Fictional characters with the name ==
- Uma, a main character in Oobi
- Uma, a main villain in Disney's Descendants 2 and Descendants 3
- Uma, a main character in Robert Louis Stevenson's Polynesian tale "The Beach of Falesá"

== See also ==
- Uma (disambiguation)
- Una (disambiguation)
- Oona, given name
- Oonagh, given name
- Hunna, French saint
