= Campagna e Marittima Province =

Former province of the Papal States

Provincia di Campagna e Marittima
- Province of the Papal States
- 1198–1816
- Flag
- Capital: Ferentino; Frosinone
- History
  - Established: 1198
  - Disestablished: 1816
Preceded by	Succeeded by
Comitatus Campaniae (Papal States)	Apostolic Delegation of Frosinone (Papal province)

The Campagna and Marittima Province (Latin Campaniæ Maritimæque Provincia, Italian Provincia di Campagna e Marittima) was one of the five provinces of the Papal States from the 12th century to the end of the 18th.

The province was established by Pope Innocent III in the year 1198, with Frosinone as its capital. Innocent's aim was to counter attempts to achieve self-government in some of the towns in the south of his domains, such as Alatri, Ferentino, Velletri and Terracina, by installing a garrison at Ferentino. Even before that the "Province of the Roman Campagna and Marittima Province' was part of the Patrimony of St Peter.

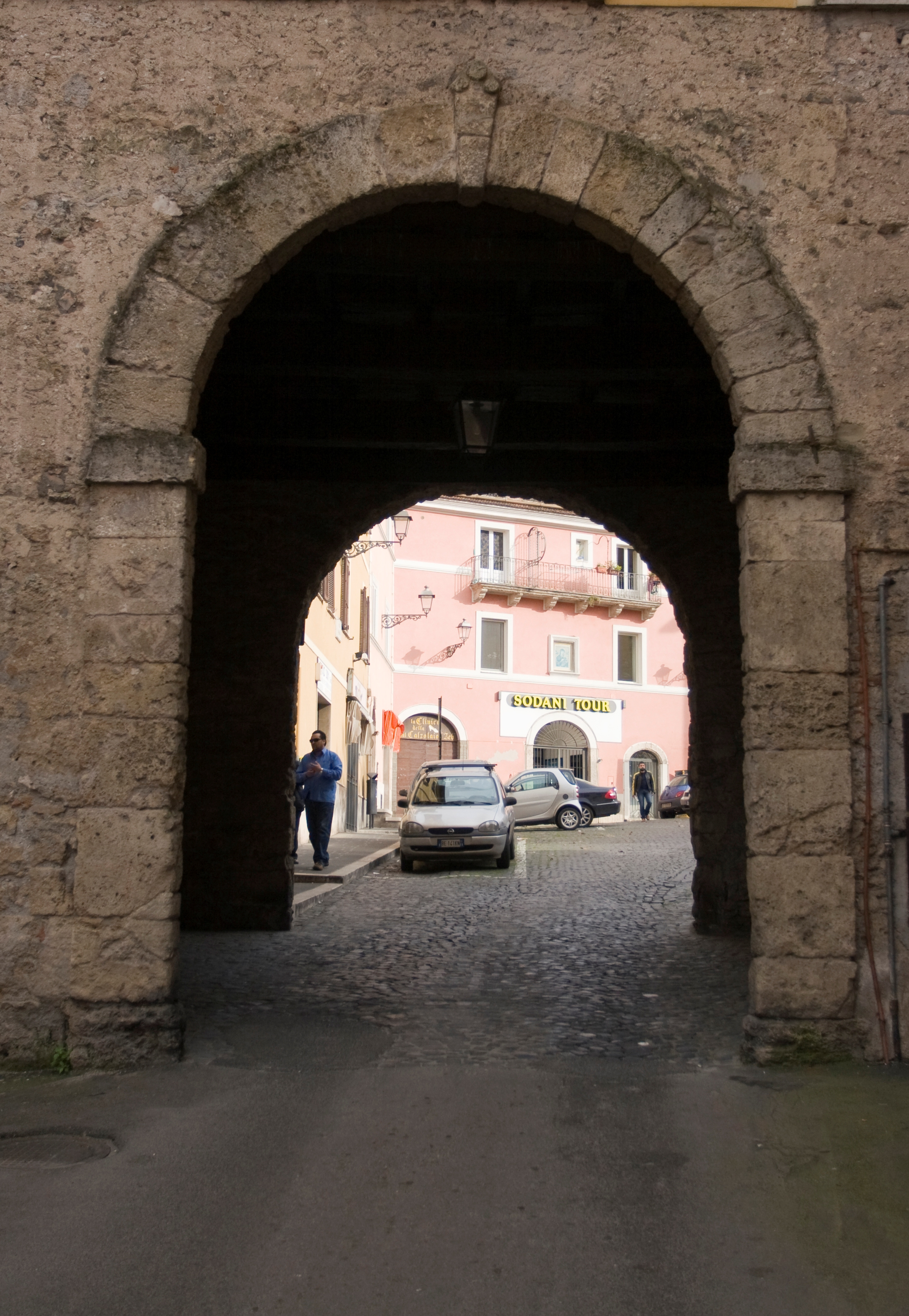
The Roman Gate at Frosinone

In 1357, the establishment of the province was confirmed by the Constitutiones Sanctæ Matris Ecclesiæ.

The province was administered by a class of feudal 'Roman barons'.

== Marittima e Campagna ==
Marittima e Campagna was a papal legation (IV Legation) from 1850 until 1860, when it was annexed by the Kingdom of Sardinia as part of the unification of Italy. It covered a slightly larger area than the old Campagna and Marittima province.
