= UMA =

UMA may refer to:

== Science and technology ==
- Unified memory architecture, a synonym of "integrated graphics", in computer graphics processing units
- Unlicensed Mobile Access, a protocol that extends mobile voice, data and multimedia over IP networks
- UMa, abbreviation for Ursa Major, a constellation in the northern sky
- Uniform memory access, a shared memory architecture in parallel computers
- Upper memory area, in DOS memory management
- User-Managed Access, an access management protocol standard

== Organisations ==
- Arab Maghreb Union (Union du Maghreb Arabe), a political and economic union
- Argentine Mathematical Union (Spanish: Unión Matemática Argentina)
- Ukrainian Museum-Archives, a museum in Cleveland, Ohio, U.S.
- UMA Engineering Ltd., now AECOM
- Umeå School of Architecture, Sweden
- Universal Music Australia, a music corporation
- University of Madeira (UMa)
- University of Mohaghegh Ardabili, Iran
- University of Maine at Augusta, United States
- University of Málaga, Spain
- University of Mannheim, Germany

== Other uses ==
- Unidentified Mysterious Animal, another term for cryptid
- Unified managed account, a type of investment account
- Urban Music Awards, a music awards ceremony

== See also ==
- Uma (disambiguation)
