= Museum of Contemporary Art Cleveland =

Museum in Ohio, US

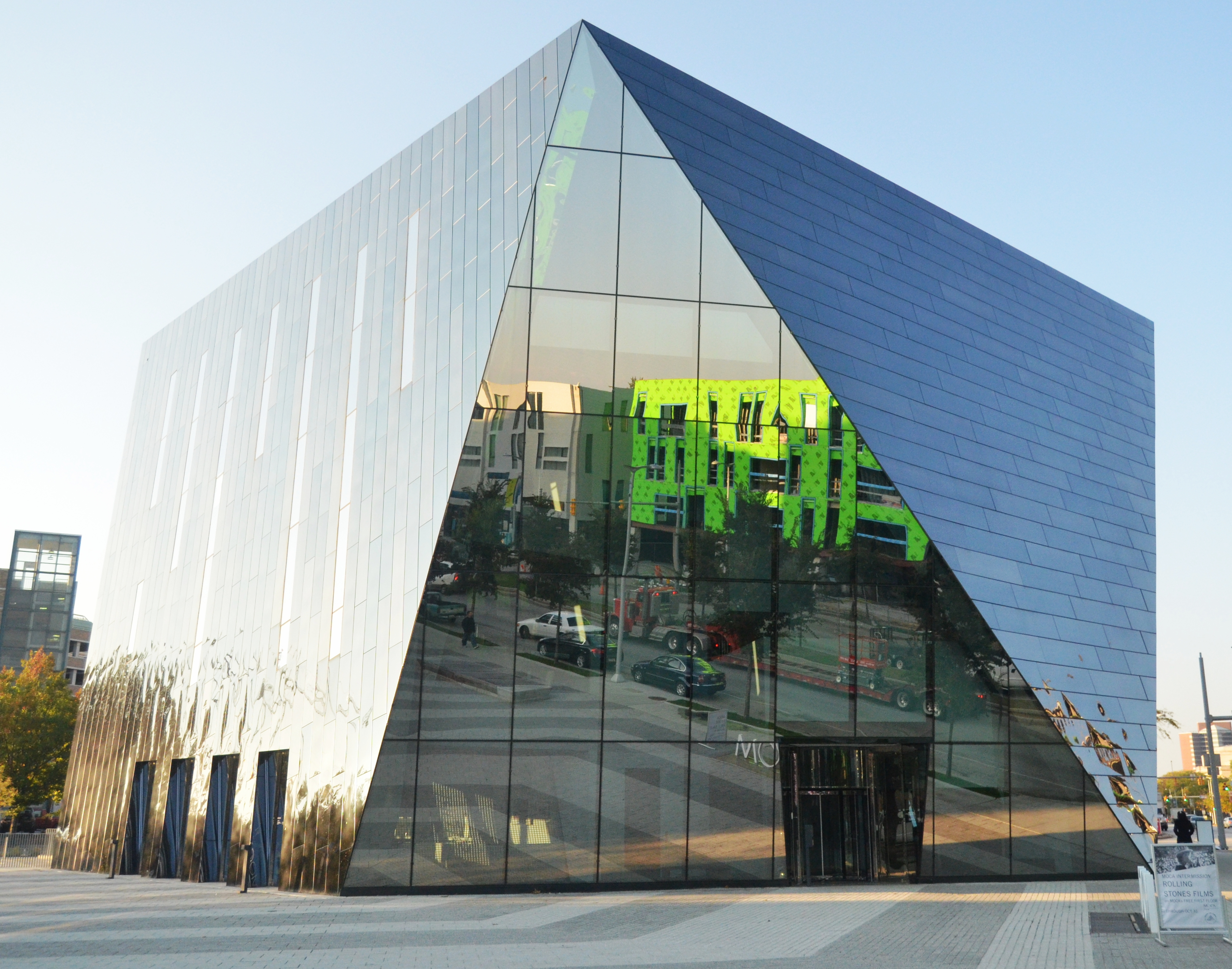
- Former name: The New Gallery
- Established: 1968
- Location: 11400 Euclid Avenue; Cleveland, Ohio 44106
- Coordinates: 41°30′32″N 81°36′17″W
- Type: Art Museum
- Collections: Contemporary
- Visitors: 40,000 annual average
- Founders: Marjorie Talalay, Nina Castelli Sundell, Agnes Gund
- Executive director: Megan Lykins Reich
- Curator: Lauren Leving
- Architect: Farshid Moussavi
- Public transit access: Little Italy–University Circle
- Parking: Metered Lots, Public Parking Garages, Street Parking
- Website: www.mocacleveland.org

The Museum of Contemporary Art Cleveland (abbreviated to moCa) is a contemporary art museum in Cleveland, Ohio, United States. It is the only contemporary art venue of its kind in Metropolitan Cleveland. The organization was founded by Marjorie Talalay, Agnes Gund, and Nina Castelli Sundell in 1968 and has undergone several name and venue changes in the years following its 1968 founding. Originally known as The New Gallery, the museum was rebranded as the Cleveland Centre for Contemporary Art in 1984. The gallery has operated under its current branding as the Museum of Contemporary Art Cleveland (moCa) since 2002.

== History ==
=== 1968 ===
In its formative years the gallery was run by co-founder Marjorie Talalay and her husband Anselm; however, it has since existed in different forms since its 1968 conception as The New Gallery. The New Gallery originated as a for-profit gallery and occupied a repurposed dry-cleaning storefront at 11301 Euclid Avenue, on the corner of Ford Drive.

=== 1974–1990 ===
In 1974 the organisation was restructured as a non-for profit organisation and underwent its first name change to the Cleveland Centre for Contemporary Art (CCCA) in 1984. The museum was then relocated to the second floor of the Cleveland Playhouse Complex. This move in 1990 enabled an expansion of their exhibition space to consist of a 20,000-square-foot (1900m^{2}) occupation in the former Sears store on East 86th Street and Carnegie Avenue; a space that was retrofit by Richard Fleischman + Partners Architects.

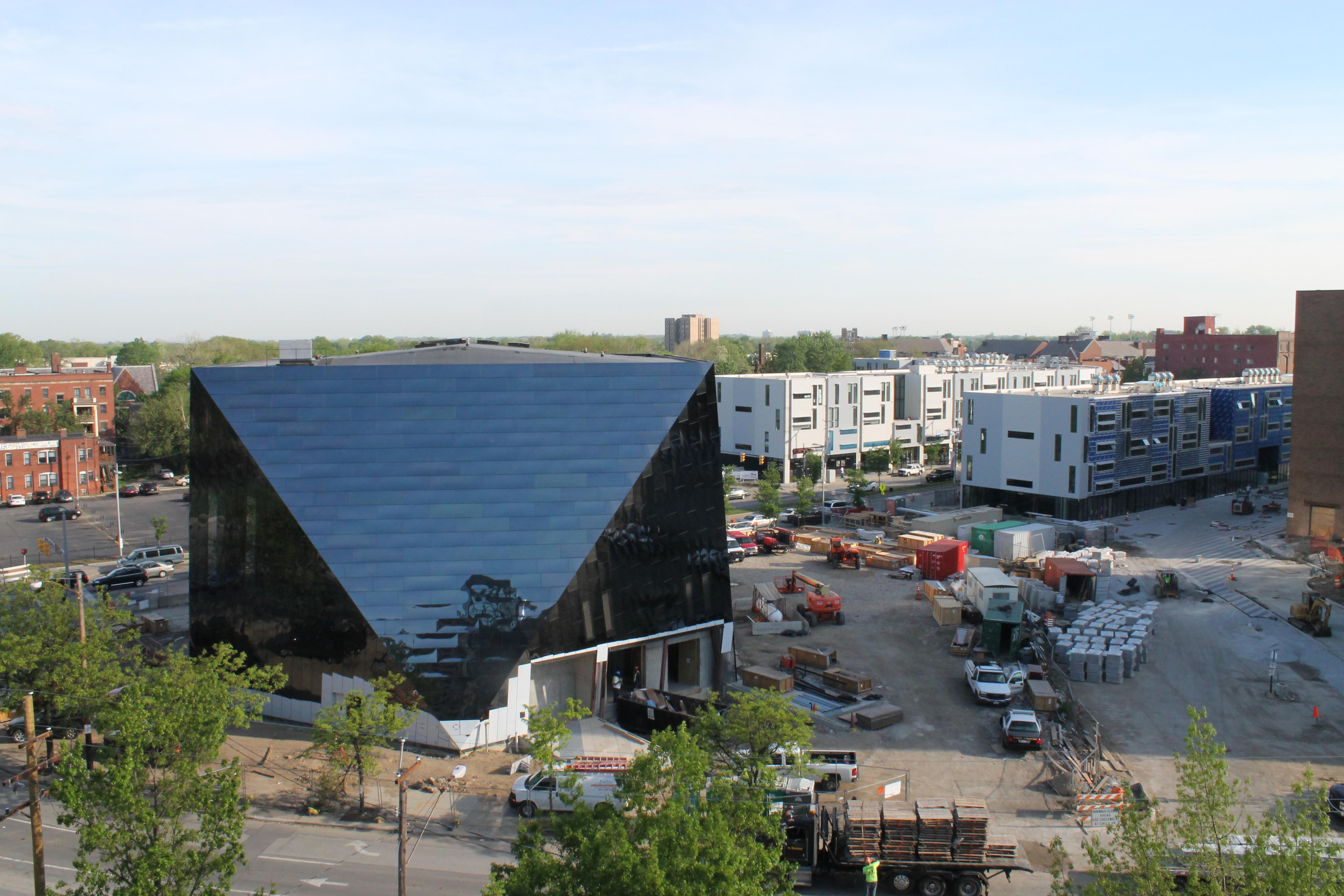
2012 Construction of the moCa

=== 1996–2018 ===
In 1996 Jill Snyder assumed the position of museum's executive director. Snyder's involvement guided the museum's reputation and financial growth as in 2002 she initiated the rebranding from Cleveland Centre for Contemporary Art to the Museum of Contemporary Art Cleveland. Snyder's development of the moCa predominantly manifest in support of the organisation's relocation to Cleveland's Uptown. The Uptown cultural district of Cleveland borders Case Western Reserve University and the Cleveland Institute of Art. In 2011 Snyder reiterated the intention to return the museum to Euclid Avenue and on the 8th of October the newest iteration of the moCa was opened. The $27.2 million building on the intersection of Mayfield Road retains a similar gallery scale to past Cleveland Playhouse Complex. In 2018 the Museum of Contemporary Art rebranded their acronym from MOCA to moCa to reflect their contemporary art ethos by drawing focus to the uppercase “c”.

=== 2020 ===
In response to the Coronavirus disease 2019 and the ongoing international 2019-20 coronavirus pandemic the Museum of Contemporary Art Cleveland was closed on the 16th March 2020, but reopened in the fall of 2020.

=== Awards ===
The Museum of Contemporary Art Cleveland has won the following awards:

- Leadership in Energy and Environmental Design (LEED), Silver Status for Sustainability
- Dominion Community Impact Award (2014)
- Rudy Bruner for Urban Excellence (RBA), Silver Medal (2015)

== Architecture ==
The 2012 design of the moCa was led by British-Iranian architect Farshid Moussavi and Foreign Office Architects (FOA). Moussavi with a budget of US$18.7 million worked alongside the American architectural firm Westlake Reed Leskosky (WRL) to create the four-storey, 34,000-square foot project. The design was initially released to the public in 2010 through online platforms, with the construction of the six-sided building spanning from 2008 to 2012.

=== Farshid Moussavi ===
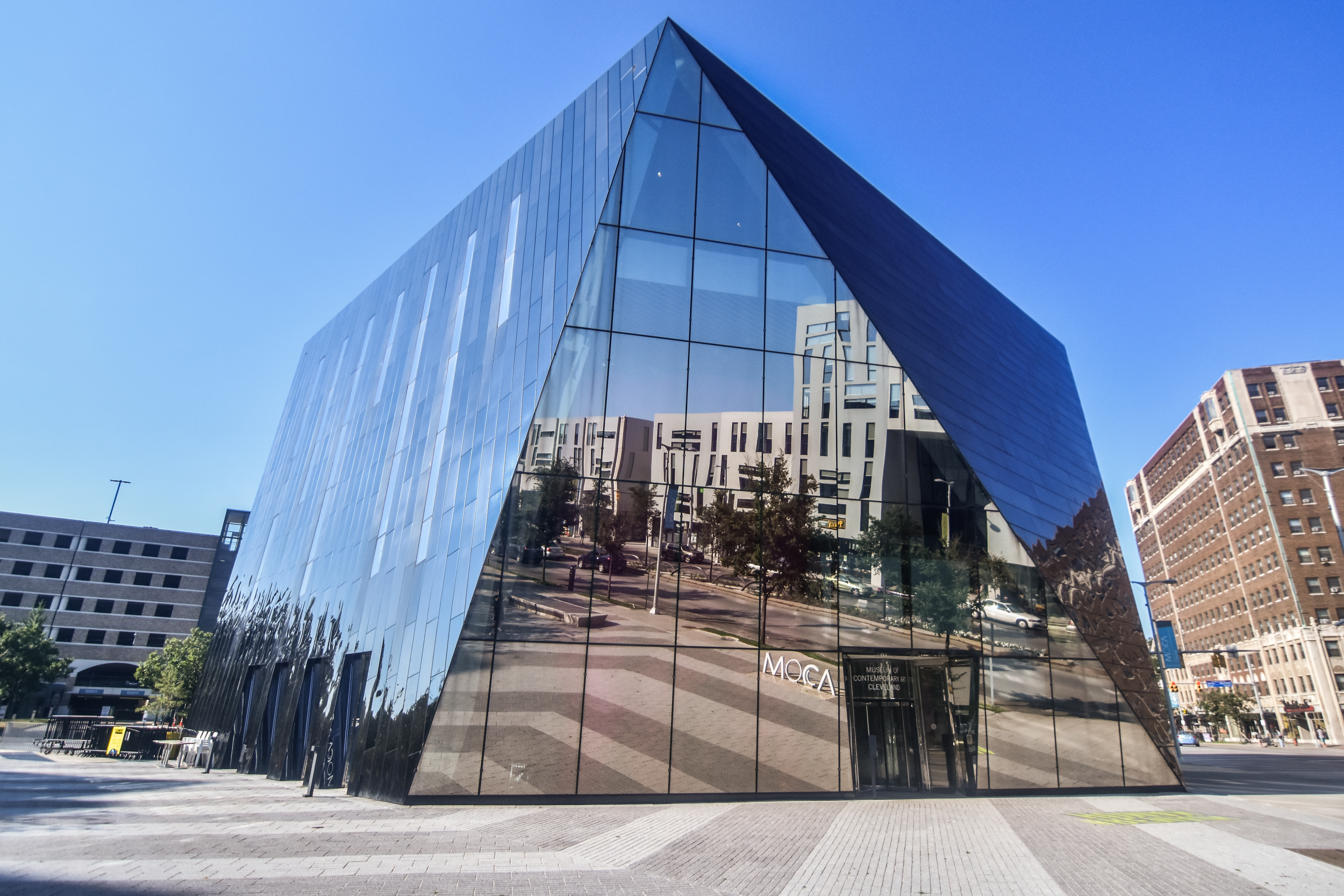
Reflections in the Iconic Exterior Facade

The architectural design integrates the museum within the surrounding Uptown and encourages an interaction through the building's façade. From the ground floor the moCa is accessible along all sides of the façade with the main entrance positioned facing east and overlooking Toby's Plaza (designed by the American architectural firm James Corner Field Operations). The project reflects the ethos of the museum and as described by Moussavi is “designed to serve as a public ‘living room’ in a cosmopolitan Cleveland neighbourhood... (acting) as a catalyst for creativity and growth for the city”. The materiality of the building translates an idea of the creative motivations of the Museum of Contemporary Art Cleveland with Moussavi describing the reflective black stainless steel of the exterior as a decision to allow a play of sunlight and mirroring of the surrounding plaza. The designer relies on the use of reflective surfaces and shifting interior walls to create a physicalisation of the museum's multiple identities, as both gallery and event space. The use of an electric blue wall and ceiling paint throughout the gallery spaces was chosen by Moussavi to enhance the display of the artworks. The consistent blue interior surfaces throughout the museum acts in a redefinition of the traditional ‘white-cube’ gallery setting.

=== Key Spaces ===
There are four floors in the Museum of Contemporary Art Cleveland. Visitors are guided through the museum by the Kohl Family Monumental Staircase that links to the Kohl Atrium and upper levels. The spaces throughout are primarily divided by ‘switch elements’ of moveable, glass and guillotine walls, with the 6000-square foot top floor defined by these walls to encourage the flexible programming in the museum's ethos. Additionally, there is a designated space specifically for media work and a lounge with a view of the Uptown that refers back to the importance of the structure's integration within the site.

Other notable spaces include the Kohl Atrium, Gund Commons, and moCa store; all of which contribute to the 'museum's program and engagement with event hosting. The Gund Commons is a two-storey event space that occupies 1400-square foot of the museum. The current deputy director Megan Lykins Reich emphasises the key feature of this space as the garage door that can be utilised to close the space for smaller use by the Cleveland Foundation Lobby. The moCa Gift Store is also designed to be multifunctional with a cabinetry configuration that can be hidden away to provide another separate but open space for events.

== Management ==
=== Admission ===
The moCa has maintained a strong presence within the cultural landscape of Cleveland. The contemporary ethos of the organisation is outlined in their 2015 – 2018 Strategic Plan and cultivates an “experience of discovery” for visitors, with an “enterprising approach” that is designed to reflect Cleveland's “cosmopolitan flair". As a non-collecting museum the organisation is afforded a high degree of flexibility in program and exhibition planning. Daily admission to the museum was made free (as of March 19, 2019) in response to their Strategic Plan and aims to foster visitor accessibility and engagement. The museum's free entry was developed as part of their Inclusivity Initiative, alongside a “diversity-focused curatorial fellowship, an engagement-guide apprenticeship program, onsite programming refinement and education specialists.

=== Attendance ===
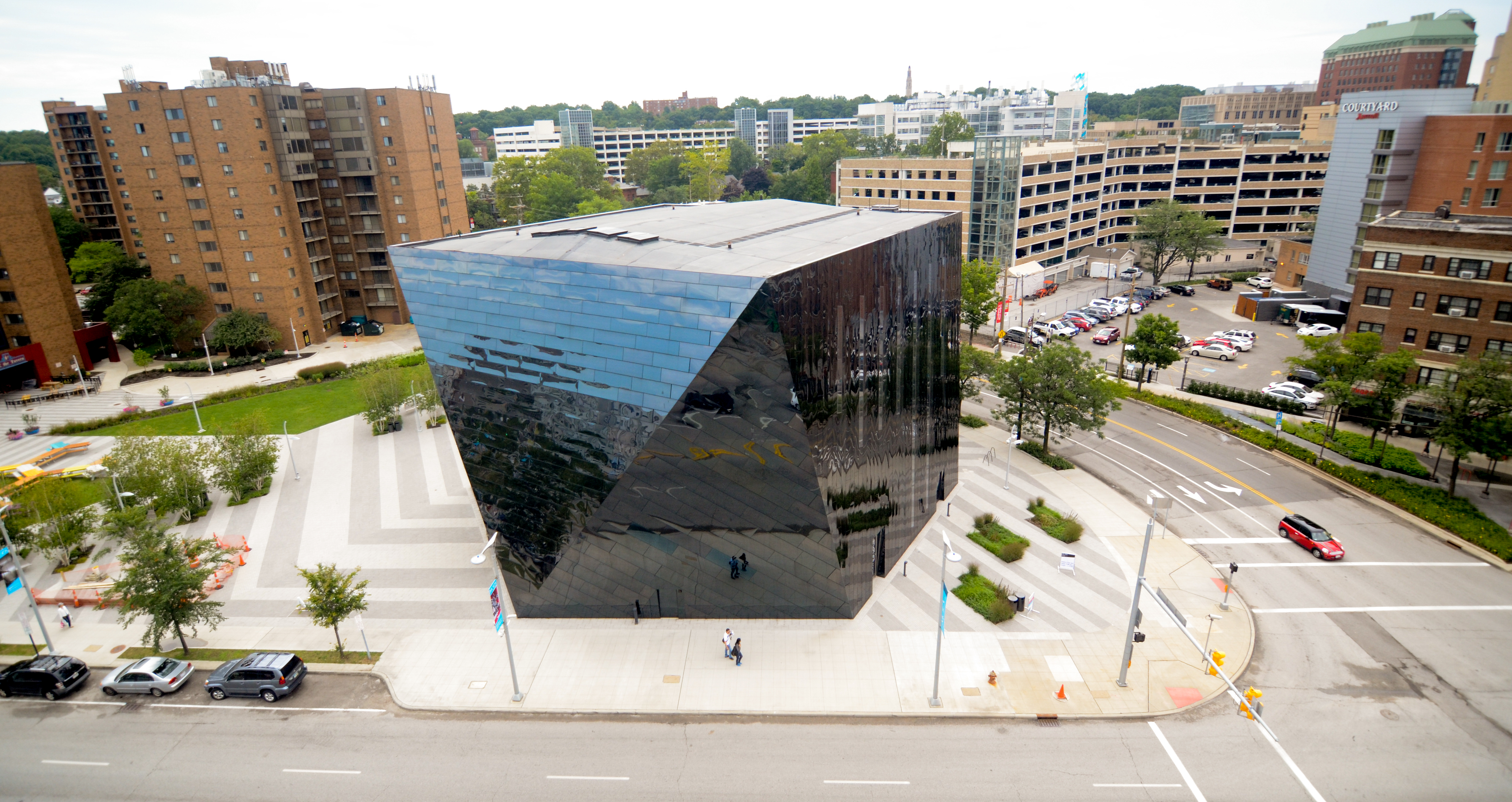
2014 moCa and the surrounding Uptown

Museum attendance has fluctuated over the years. This reflects the successes of museum's location and board of staff structuring. In the mid-90s, towards the end of Talalay's directorship, the minimum record was 11,000 visitors. Under Jill Snyder's presidency there was a growth in attendance to 20,000. In its first year at its Uptown location the moCa drew an upwards of 56,000. According to the Cleveland ARTS Education Consortium (CAEC) average number of patrons is 40,000.

=== Site Integration ===
In the wake of the moCa's 2012 relocation to Uptown University Circle, the museum collaborated with a group of post graduate students from the neighbouring Case Western Reserve University to enhance integration within the area. The report responded to the increased visibility and visitation potential of the new Uptown site.

=== Education ===
A component of the aforementioned Inclusivity Initiative is the museum's ongoing Education Programs. These include curriculums for children and adults of all ages through interactive tours and Learning Labs. Additionally, they present a number of artist talks, gallery tours and programs that interact with the wider cultural community.

== Operational Figures ==
=== Founders ===
The Museum of Contemporary Art Cleveland (previously known as The New Gallery) was founded by three figures. Marjorie Talalay co-founded The New Gallery and headed the organisation for the first 25 years. Nina Castelli Sundell, another co-founder of the original moCa is an American curator who, alongside Susan Sollins, went on to co-find the Independent Curators International (ICI). The third party, Agnes Gund (the former president of the Museum of Modern Art in New York) is an honorary trustee and silent co-founder of the Museum of Contemporary Art Cleveland. The American art philanthropist has both donated and loaned a large number of art works to the museum's past exhibitions that has contributed to the museum's contemporary development.

=== Directors ===
Following Marjorie Talalay's retirement from the position, and Gary Sangster's two year directorship, Jill Snyder was installed as executive director. Snyder has maintained her position as executive director from 1996 to the present day (2020), and previously held a directorial position at the Solomon R. Guggenheim Museum. Megan Lykins Reich started at moCa in 2004, served as deputy director, and was named Executive Director in 2022. In 2020 she contributed an essay titled Making an Urban Living Room within Georgia Lindsay's Contemporary Museum Architecture and Design, Theory and Practice of Place that discusses the moCa's design process and thinking.

=== Curatorial ===
The moCa is facilitated by a team of six curators; Courtenay Finn, Kate Montlack, Ray Juaire, Eli Gfell, La Tanya Autry, Thea Spittle. The museum's curation places a special focus on artists from Greater Cleveland and the rest of Northeastern Ohio, with regional group shows that are curated every two years.

== Works ==
The Museum of Contemporary Art Cleveland, in its nature as a non-collecting museum, isn't restricted to traditional gallery programming, exhibitions or storage. In the early stages of its existence, The New Gallery has attracted works by artists in the likes of Christo, Andy Warhol, Robert Rauschenberg, Jasper Johns and Roy Lichtenstein. Today, the moCa offers an exhibition schedule that refreshes three times each year.

=== Selected Past Exhibitions ===
- In 2018, the Museum of Contemporary Art Cleveland celebrated its 50th anniversary. As part of these celebrations and the “Open House” initiative to encourage a greater engagement between the museum and the public.
- In 2019, the moCa hosted the first collaboration between Chinese artist Liu Wei and an American museum, entitled Invisible Cities. The exhibition was presented in collaboration in venues of both the Museum of Contemporary Art Cleveland and nearby Cleveland Museum of Art, with a unique response to the architecture of each institution.

=== Selected Temporary Highlights ===
- Third Man Begins Digging Through Pockets (2012), a site-specific work by Katharina Grosse, in the Kohl Atrium.
- OFF THE RULING CLASS (2015) and THE ANTITHINKERS (2015), two specifically commissioned double projection video works by Nevet Yitzak, in the Gund Commons.
- moCa's more recent, critically acclaimed exhibitions have included Inside Out and From the Ground Up (Fall 2012), Corin Hewitt: Hedge (Winter 2013), Michelle Grabner: I Work from Home (Fall 2013), Dirge: Reflections on (Life and) Death (Winter/Spring 2014), Kirk Mangus: Things Love (Fall 2014), Stranger (Winter 2016), Xavier Cha: abduct (Winter 2016)

== See also ==
- List of museums in Cleveland
- Contemporary Art
