= Cleveland Hungarian Museum =

Museum in Cleveland, Ohio, US

- Location: 1301 East 9th St, Cleveland, Ohio
- Coordinates: 41.505°N 81.6894°W
- Owner: Cleveland Hungarian Heritage Society
- Website: clevelandhungarianmuseum.org

The Cleveland Hungarian Museum, located at 1301 East 9th Street in Cleveland, Ohio, protects and preserves the history of Hungarians in northeast Ohio, United States. Displays include Hungarian artwork, folk costumes and other items of Hungarian heritage. It is operated by the Cleveland Hungarian Heritage Society.

== See also ==
- Cleveland Ukrainian Museum
- Hungarian Ohioans
