= Gil Álvarez Carrillo de Albornoz =

14th-century Spanish cardinal and archbishop

His Eminence Gil Álvarez Carrillo de Albornoz
- Cardinal-Bishop
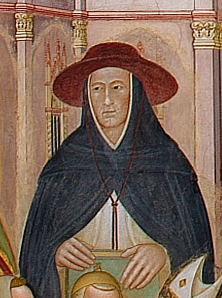
- Cardinal Gil de Albornoz in the fresco Churches Militant, Penitent, and Triumphant by Andrea di Bonaiuto da Firenze, c. 1365
- Church: Roman Catholic Church
- Archdiocese: Toledo
- Province: Toledo

Orders
- Consecration: 17 December 1350
- Created cardinal: 17 December 1350 by Pope Clement VI

Personal details
- Born: Egidio Álvarez de Albornoz y Luna c. 1295/1310 Carrascosa del Campo, Crown of Castile
- Died: August 23, 1367 (aged 56–57) Viterbo, Papal States
- Buried: Chapel of San Ildefonso; 40°2′10″N 2°44′12″W
- Coat of arms: Gil Álvarez Carrillo de Albornoz's coat of arms

Chancellor of Toledo
- In office c. 1350–c. 1367

Gil Álvarez Carrillo de Albornoz more commonly Gil de Albornoz (also Egidio Álvarez de Albornoz y Luna); c. 1295/1310 – 23 August 1367), was a Spanish curial cardinal, archbishop of Toledo from 13 May 1338 to 17 December 1350. Grand Penitentiary from December 1352 to August 23, 1364. Cardinal priest with the title of San Clemente from December 17, 1350, to December 1356. Cardinal bishop of Sabina from December 1356 to August 23, 1364. Cardinal legate and vicar general from 30 June 1353 to 1357, who led as condottiere Papal States mercenary armies in two campaigns to reconquer territory in Italy, and statesman.

Albornoz was born in Carrascosa del Campo, Spain. Raised in Zaragoza and educated alongside his mother's brother, Albornoz pursued his studies in law at Toulouse. As the Archbishop of Toledo, he held two reform synods, and throughout his career, he demonstrated his military prowess. He fought against a Marinid invasion from Morocco in 1340 at the Battle of Río Salado and led the armed levy of his archbishopric at the taking of Algeciras in 1344.

In 1350, Pope Clement VI appointed Albornoz as a cardinal-priest of S. Clemente, recognizing his military and diplomatic abilities. Shortly after Pope Innocent VI's election in 1352, Albornoz was appointed grand penitentiary and given the epithet "Angel of Peace." However, this title would become an ironic misnomer as he later led campaigns in the Papal States.

In 1353, Pope Innocent VI sent Albornoz to Italy with the goal of restoring papal authority in the Church states. Leading a small mercenary army, he embarked on a series of successful campaigns against various rulers, ultimately expanding the territories of the Papal States. During his time in Italy, Albornoz issued the Constitutiones Sanctæ Matris Ecclesiæ, which effectively regulated the Papal States and their division into provinces until 1816.

Despite a decade of warfare and multiple successful campaigns, Albornoz's efforts did not completely secure peace and stability in Italy. The Papal State itself faced ongoing conflicts, and mercenary companies roamed Italy, spreading further bloodshed and strife. Regardless, as a mark of gratitude for his service, Pope Urban V appointed Albornoz as legate at Bologna in 1367.

In addition to his military and diplomatic achievements, Albornoz left a lasting legacy in the field of education. In 1364, he founded the College of Saint Clement in Bologna to benefit Castilian, Aragonese, and Portuguese students, providing them with a unique learning opportunity.

Albornoz was a descendant of the kings of León and Aragón and founder of the Collegio di Spagna, an academic institution of Bologna.

== Life ==
=== Early life ===
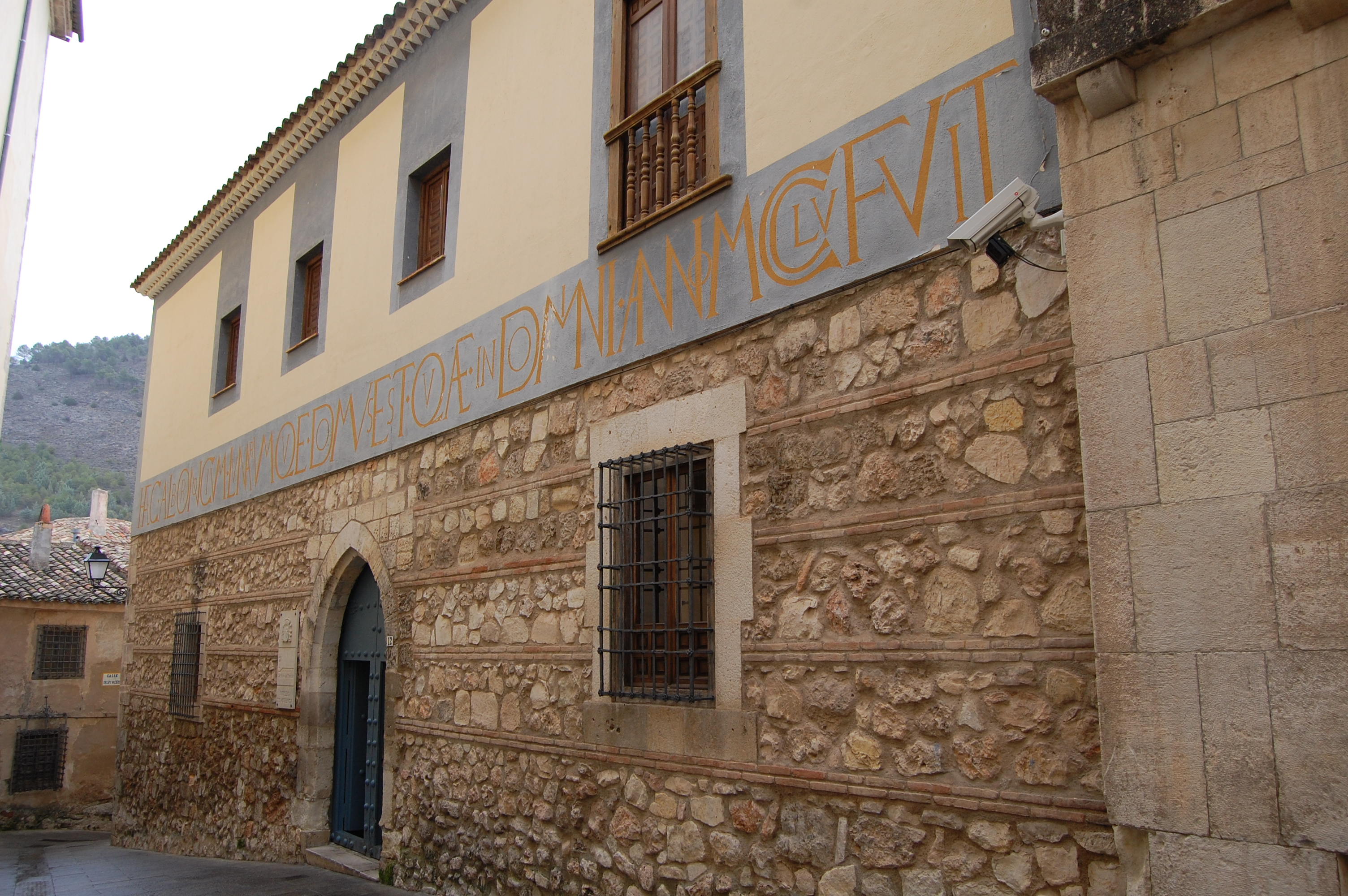
House of the Albornoz and Luna family in Cuenca, where Gil de Albornoz spent his childhood.

Albornoz was the son of Garcialuarez Albornoz, IV Lord of Albornoz, (Note: As follows, a description of Sepúlveda of his book. Spanish: Gil de Albornoz de nacion Español, natural de la ciudad de Cuenca, del linage esclarescido delos Albornozes hijo de Garcialuarez de Albornoz, Señor de muchos pueblos: descendié te por linea recta del linage de dó Alonso Quinto Rey de Leon, y de doña Teresa de Luna su muger, del alto linage de don Iayme Rey de Aragon. English: Gil de Albornoz of Spanish nation, native of the city of Cuenca, of the enlightened lineage of the Albornozes son of Garcialuarez de Albornoz, Lord of many towns: descended by straight line from the lineage of Alonso Quinto King of Leon, and Doña Teresa de Luna his wife, of the high lineage of Don Iayme King of Aragon.) tutor to the future King Alfonso XI, originally from Uña, Cuenca, and Doña Teresa de Luna, sister of Jimeno de Luna, archbishop of Toledo and a member of the prominent Carrillo family. He was born in late 1302 or early 1303, in Carrascosa del Campo, (Cuenca). He was raised and educated in Zaragoza, with his mother's brother, and studied law in Toulouse.

At the battle of Río Salado he successfully fought against a Marinid invasion from Morocco in 1340, and at the taking of Algeciras in 1344 he led the armed levy of his archbishopric. As Archbishop of Toledo he held two reform synods; one at Toledo in May 1339, the other at Alcalá in April 1347. In 1343 he had been sent to Pope Clement VI at Avignon to negotiate a grant of a tax on the revenues of the Church for the Crusade. Albornoz left Spain on the death of the king Alfonso XI in March 1350, and never returned. It has been said, but not on contemporary evidence, that he fled from fear of Pedro of Castile. His military and diplomatic ability became known to the pope, who made him a cardinal-priest of S. Clemente in December of that year, at which point he resigned the archbishopric of Toledo.

He was appointed grand penitentiary shortly after election of Pope Innocent VI in December 1352 and given the epithet "Angel of Peace", a title which quickly became an ironic misnomer given his future campaigns in the Papal States.

== Campaigns ==
=== Italy ===
==== First ====
In 1353 Innocent VI sent him as a legate into Italy, with a view to the restoration of the papal authority in the states of the Church, at the head of a small mercenary army. After receiving the support of the archbishop of Milan, Giovanni Visconti, and of those of Pisa, Florence and Siena, he started a campaign against Giovanni di Vico, lord of Viterbo, who had usurped much of the Papal territories in the Latium and Umbria. Giovanni was defeated in the battle of Viterbo of 10 March 1354 and signed a treaty of submission. To mark his authority over Viterbo, he immediately decided to build a palace there near the San Faustino church. (Note: Known today as Palazzo Lomellino di Aragona-Carnevalini, this palace was restored after damage suffered in 1944. It houses the Museum of Etruscan Art.)

Albornoz then moved to the Marche and Romagna against the Malatesta of Rimini and the Ordelaffi of Forlì. The Papal commander Rodolfo II da Varano, lord of Camerino, defeated Galeotto Malatesta, forcing his family to become a loyal ally of the Pope. This was followed by the submission of the Montefeltro of Urbino and the da Polenta of Ravenna, and of the cities of Senigallia and Ancona. Towards the end of 1356 Albornoz was appointed as bishop of Sabina.

Only Giovanni Manfredi of Faenza and Francesco II Ordelaffi of Forlì were at that point resisting the Papal reconquest. In 1356, a crusade was declared against them. Albornoz had managed to submit only the former when he was being recalled in 1357, being replaced by Androin de la Roche, abbot of Cluny. Before leaving, in a meeting with all the Papal vicars held on 29 April 1357, Albornoz issued the Constitutiones Sanctæ Matris Ecclesiæ, which regulated all the matters of the Papal States and its division into provinces. They remained effective until 1816.

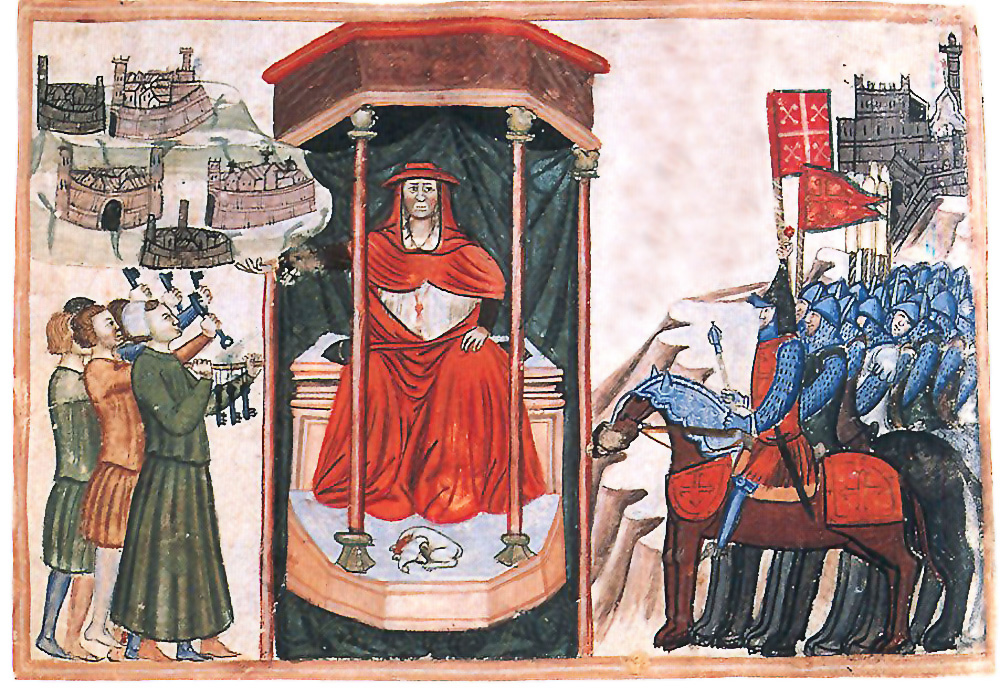
14th century miniature showing Cardinal Albornoz receiving the keys of the subjugated Italian cities

==== Second ====
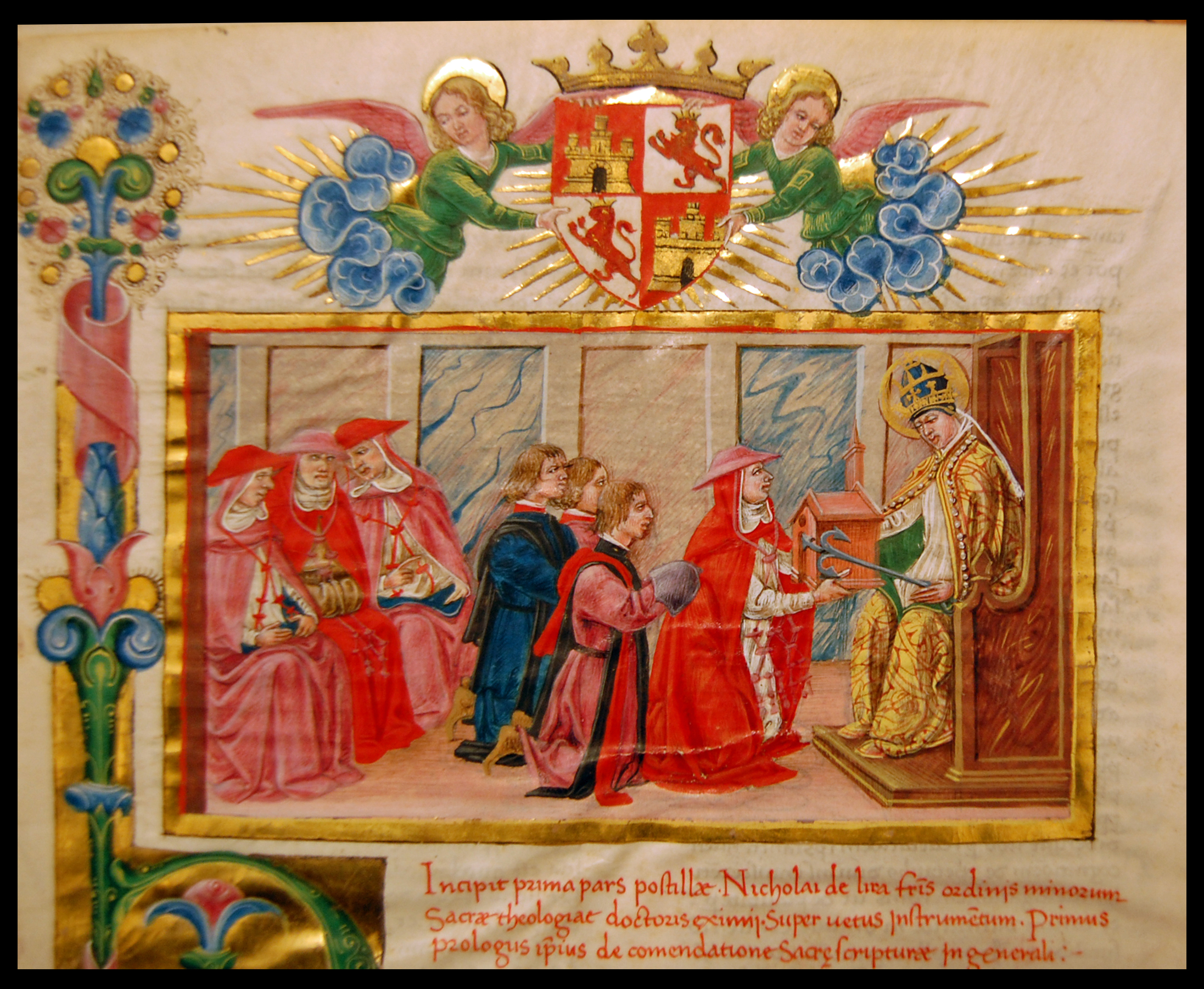
Albornoz giving the Collegio di Spagna to Pope Clement I from a symbolic miniature illustration in one of the Collegio's biblical manuscripts

The Cardinal was honoured as Pater Ecclesiæ at his arrival in Avignon. His sojourn there was to be short, however, as Giovanni di Vico and Francesco Ordelaffi (who had hired the famous condottiero Konrad von Landau's "Grand Company") were menacing the fragile balance of his last conquests. Returned to Italy, Albornoz found an agreement with Landau, forcing Ordelaffi to surrender on 4 July 1359. He then promulgates in the name of the pope the Constitutiones Sanctae Matri Ecclesiae, general regulations of the pontifical administration of the domain of Saint-Pierre.

Albornoz missed only Bologna to complete his rebuilding of the Papal States. When that city was attacked by Bernabò Visconti of Milan, its ruler, Giovanni d'Oleggio, decided to hand it over to Albornoz. In the meantime, Innocent died: the Spanish cardinal refused the tiara, and Urban V was elected. Under him Albornoz started the military campaign against Visconti and, when all attacks failed, Urban proclaimed a crusade against him.

As Urban's greatest desire was that of a crusade against the Turks, the two parts signed a hasty peace, which was highly favourable to Visconti. The relentless work of Albornoz ushered in a decade of warfare and atrocity culminating in the massacre of Cesena, a town faithful to the Papal cause whose entire population was executed by the Papal forces while paving the way of Urban V to Rome (1367).

As legate, Albornoz showed himself to be an astute manager of men and effective fighter. He began by making use of Cola di Rienzo (former leader of the citizenship freedom in Rome), whose release from prison at Avignon he secured. After the murder of the tribune in 1354 Albornoz pursued his task of restoring the pope's authority by intrigue and force with remarkable success. However, the ten years of bloody warfare conducted by Albornoz accomplished very little to secure the pacification of Italy for now four mercenary companies roved through Italy spreading further bloodshed and strife. The Papal State was itself far from completely pacified; a savage and devastating war went on from 1361 to 1367 between Rome and Velletri while in 1366-7 there was a general rebellion in Campagna. Despite all and as a mark of gratitude the pope appointed him legate at Bologna in 1367, but he died at Viterbo the same year. According to his own desire his remains were carried to Toledo, where Henry of Castile had them entombed with almost royal honours.

The college of Saint Clement at Bologna was founded by Albornoz for the benefit Castilian, Aragonese and Portuguese students, in 1364.

== Archbishop ==
He was elected archbishop of Toledo by the cathedral chapter to succeed his uncle Jimeno de Luna. The election was confirmed by Pope Benedict XII by decree of the Pontifical Foreign Ministry given in Avignon on 13 May 1338, in which he is mentioned as Deacon, Archdian of the Order of Calatrava, Pontifical Chaplain and Doctor of Decrees.

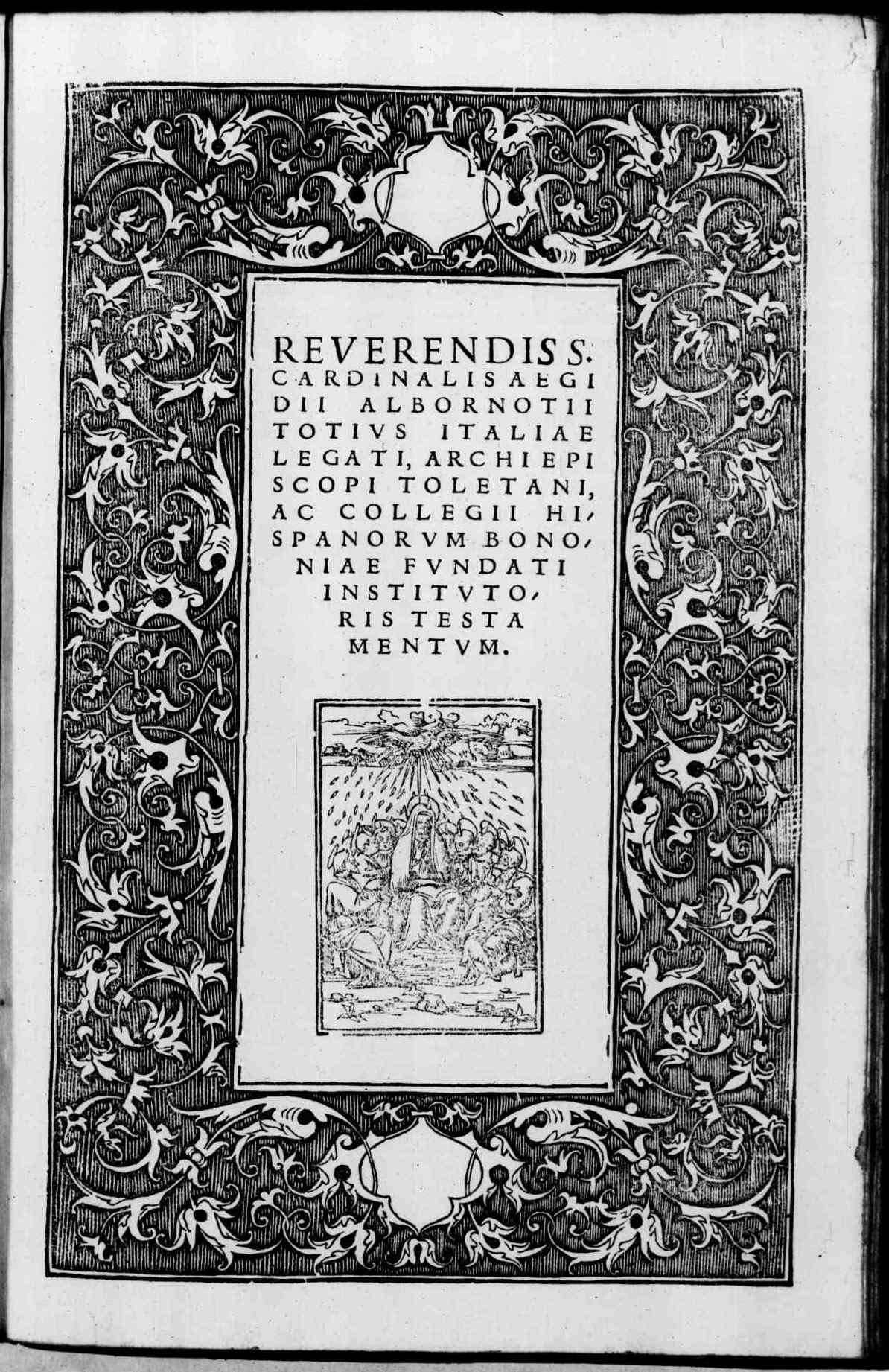
Testamentum, 1533

== See also ==
- Avignon Papacy
- Constitutiones Sanctæ Matris Ecclesiæ
- Papal States
- War of the Eight Saints
- History of Rome
- Cola di Rienzo

== Works ==
- Testamentum (in Latin). Bologna: Girolamo Benedetti. 1533.

== Bibliography ==
- Cervigón, José Ignacio Ortega (2009). "Nobleza y poder en la tierra de cuenca: nuevos datos sobre el linaje albornoz" [Nobility and power in the basin land: new data on the Albornoz lineage]. Miscelánea Medieval Murciana (in Spanish) (33): 143–173. doi:10.6018/j103411. hdl:10201/16600. ISSN 1989-4597.
- Cassagnes-Brouquet, Sophie; Doumerc, Bernard (2011). Les condottieres : capitaines, princes et mécènes en Italie : XIIIe–XVIe siècle [The condottieres: captains, princes and patrons in Italy: 13th–16th century] (in French). Paris: Ellipses. ISBN 978-2-7298-6345-6.
- Eco, Umberto (2018). "La recuperación de los territorios del Estado pontificio" [The recovery of the territories of the Papal State]. La Edad Media, III: Castillos, mercaderes y poetas [The Middle Ages, III: Castles, merchants and poets] (in Spanish). Vol. 3. Ciudad de México: FCE. ISBN 978-607-16-6095-4.
- Moxó y Montoliu, Francisco de (1990). La casa de Luna (1276–1348) : factor político y lazos de sangre en la ascensión de un linaje aragonés [The house of Luna (1276–1348): political factor and blood ties in the rise of an Aragonese lineage]. Münster: Aschendorffsche Verlagsbuchhandlung. ISBN 3-402-05825-1. OCLC 24170808.
- Sepúlveda, Juan Ginés de (1566). Hystoria de los hechos del illustrissimo Señor Cardenal Don Gil de Albornoz Arçobispo de Toledo [History of the deeds of the most illustrious Lord Cardinal Don Gil de Albornoz Archbishop of Toledo] (in Spanish).
- Valdecasas, José Guillermo García (2007). Las Artes de la Paz: Ensayos [The Arts of Peace: Essays: Homage to thirty years of Rectorship at the Royal College of Spain in Bologna, 1977–2007] (in Spanish). Madrid: Centro de Estudios Europa Hispánica. ISBN 978-84-936060-1-5.

Catholic Church titles
Preceded by Jimeno de Luna	Archbishops of Toledo; Primate of Spain; 1338-1350	Succeeded by Gonzalo de Aguilar
Preceded by Pierre Bertrand	Cardinal of Basilica of Saint Clement; 1350-1356	Succeeded by Pierre de La Jugié
Preceded by Bertrand de Déaulx	Cardinal bishop of Sabina; 1356-1367	Succeeded by Guillermo de Aigrefeuille
