= Unas (disambiguation) =

Unas was a king of ancient Egypt.

Unas may also refer to:

- Ünəş, a village in Azerbaijan
- Unas, a Stargate race
- Universitas Nasional (UNAS), Jakarta, Indonesia

== See also ==
- Una (disambiguation), for the singular of plural form unas
