= Patrimony of Saint Peter =

Possessions and revenues of Holy See

The Patrimony of Saint Peter (Latin: Patrimonium Sancti Petri) originally designated the landed possessions and revenues of various kinds that belonged to the apostolic Holy See. Until the middle of the 8th century this consisted wholly of private property; later, it corresponded to the territories under Papal sovereignty, but from the early 13th century the term was applied to one of the four provinces of the States of the Church.

== Patrimonial possessions of the Church of Rome ==
In AD 321 Roman Emperor Constantine the Great declared the Christian Church could hold and transmit property. This was the first legal basis for the possessions of the Church of Rome. Subsequently, they were augmented by donations. Constantine himself probably gave the Church the Lateran Palace in Rome. Constantine's gifts formed the historical nucleus for the network of myth that gave rise to the forged document known as the "Donation of Constantine".

Wealthy families of the Roman nobility followed Constantine's example. Their memory frequently survived, after the families themselves became extinct, in the names of the properties they once presented to the Roman See. During his reign, Pope Sylvester became the owner of properties in Italy, Sicily, Antioch, Asia Minor, in the region around Hippo in Numidia, Armenia, and Upper Mesopotamia. The donation of large estates ceased about 600 AD. The Byzantine emperors preferred the patriarchate of Constantinople, and were less liberal in their gifts. The wars with the Lombards likewise had an unfavourable effect, and few families were still in a position to bequeath large estates.

Apart from a number of scattered possessions in Dalmatia and southern Gaul, the patrimonies were naturally for the most part situated in Italy and on the adjacent islands. Lands in Dalmatia were lost during the Avar and Slavic invasions. The most valuable and extensive possessions were those in Sicily, around Syracuse and Palermo. The revenues from these properties in Sicily and Lower Italy were estimated at three and one-half talents of gold in the eighth century, when Byzantine Emperor Leo the Isaurian confiscated them.

But the patrimonies in the vicinity of Rome (the successors to the classical latifundia in the Ager Romanus), which had begun to form in the 7th century, were the most numerous. Most of the remote patrimonies were lost in the eighth century, so the patrimonia around Rome began to be managed with especial care, headed up by deacons directly subordinate to the pope. Other Italian patrimonies included the Neapolitan with the island of Capri, that of Gaeta, the Tuscan, the Patrimonium Tiburtinum in the vicinity of Tivoli, estates around Otranto, Osimo, Ancona, Umana, estates near Ravenna and Genoa, and lastly properties in Istria, Sardinia and Corsica.

Revenues from the patrimonies were used for administration, to maintain and build churches, to equip convents, run the papal household and support the clergy, but also to a great extent to relieve public and private want. In administering the Patrimony of St. Peter, Pope Gregory (540-604) showed a considerable grasp of detail and administrative capacity. In anticipation of a threatened corn shortage, Gregory filled the granaries of Rome with the harvests of Egypt and Sicily. Numerous poorhouses, hospitals, orphanages and hospices for pilgrims were maintained out of the revenues of the patrimonies. Gregory also spent large sums ransoming captives from the Lombards, and commended one of the bishops for breaking up and selling church plate for that purpose.

== Political role of the Papacy ==
The political aspect of the papacy became in time very prominent, as Rome, after the removal of the imperial residence to the East, was no longer the seat of any of the higher political officials. Since the partition of the empire, the Western emperors had preferred to make the better-protected Ravenna their residence. Here was the centre of Odoacer's power and of the Ostrogothic rule; here also, after the fall of the Ostrogoths, the viceroy of the Byzantine emperor in Italy, the exarch, resided.

In Rome, the pope appeared with increasing frequency in political negotiations; Pope Leo I negotiated with kings Attila of the Huns and Geiserich of the Vandals, and Pope Gelasius I with king Theodoric of the Ostrogoths. Cassiodorus, as praefectus praetorio under the Ostrogothic supremacy, entrusted the care of temporal affairs to Pope John II.

When Emperor Justinian issued the Pragmatic Sanction of 554, the pope and the Senate were entrusted with the control of weights and measures. Thenceforth for two centuries the popes were loyal supporters of the Byzantine government against the encroachments of the Lombards, and were all the more indispensable, because after 603 the Senate disappeared. The popes were now the only court of judicature, a task more often entrusted to bishops as "Defensor populi".

When Emperor Justinian II in 692 attempted to have Pope Sergius I forcibly conveyed to Constantinople, (as had happened to Pope Martin I), to extract from him his assent to the canons of the Trullan Council, convoked by the emperor, the militia of Ravenna and of the Duchy of the Pentapolis lying immediately to the south assembled, marched into Rome, and compelled the departure of the emperor's plenipotentiary. In AD 715 the papal chair, which had last been occupied by seven Eastern popes, was filled by a Westerner, Pope Gregory II, who was destined to oppose Leo III the Isaurian in the Iconoclastic conflict.

== Collapse of Byzantine power in central Italy ==
The strange shape which the States of the Church assumed from the beginning is explained by the fact that these were the districts in which the population of central Italy had defended itself to the very last against the Lombards.

In 751 Aistulf conquered Ravenna, and thereby decided the long delayed fate of the exarchate and the Pentapolis. And when Aistulf, who held Spoleto also under his immediate sway, directed all his might against the Duchy of Rome, it seemed that this too could no longer be held. Byzantium could send no troops, and Emperor Constantine V, in answer to the repeated requests for help of the new pope, Stephen II, could only offer him the advice to act in accordance with the ancient policy of Byzantium, to pit some other Germanic tribe against the Lombards. The Franks alone were powerful enough to compel the Lombards to maintain peace, and they alone stood in close relationship with the pope. Charles Martel had on a former occasion failed to respond to the entreaties of Gregory III, but meanwhile the relations between the Frankish rulers and the popes had become more intimate. Pope Zachary had only recently (751), at Pepin's accession to the Merovingian throne, spoken the word that removed all doubts in favour of the Carolingian mayor of the palace. It was not unreasonable, therefore, to expect an active show of gratitude in return, when Rome was most grievously pressed by Aistulf.

Accordingly, Stephen II secretly sent a letter to king Pepin by pilgrims, soliciting his aid against Aistulf and asking for a conference. Pepin in turn sent Abbot Droctegang of Jumièges to confer with the pope, and a little later dispatched Duke Autchar and Bishop Chrodegang of Metz to conduct the pope to the Frankish realm.

Never before had a pope crossed the Alps. While Pope Stephen was preparing for the journey, a messenger arrived from Constantinople, bringing to the pope the imperial mandate to treat once more with Aistulf for the purpose of persuading him to surrender his conquests. Stephen took with him the imperial messenger and several dignitaries of the Roman Church, as well, as members of the aristocracy belonging to the Roman militia, and proceeded first of all to Aistulf. In 753 the pope left Rome. Aistulf, when the pope met him at Pavia, refused to enter into negotiations or to hear of a restoration of his conquests. Only with difficulty did Stephen finally prevail upon the Lombard king not to hinder him in his journey to the Frankish kingdom.

== Intervention of the Franks and Formation of the States of the Church ==
The pope thereupon crossed the Great St. Bernard Pass into the Frankish kingdom. Pepin received his guest at Ponthion, and promised to do all in his power to recover the Exarchate of Ravenna and the other districts seized by Aistulf. The pope then went to St-Denis, near Paris. He concluded a firm alliance of friendship with Pepin and made him the first Carolingian king, probably in January 754. He bound the Franks under the threat of excommunication, never thereafter to choose their kings from any other family than the Carolingian. At the same time he bestowed on Pepin and his sons the title of "Patrician of the Romans", the title the Exarchs, the highest Byzantine officials in Italy, had borne. In their stead now the King of the Franks was to be the protector of the Romans and their Bishop. However, to fulfill the wishes of the pope, Pepin had eventually to obtain the consent of his nobles to a campaign into Italy. This became imperative, when several embassies attempted by peaceful means to induce the Lombard king to give up his conquests but returned without accomplishing their mission.

At Quiercy on the Oise, the Frankish nobles finally gave their consent. Pepin promised in writing to give the Church certain territories, the first documentary record for the States of the Church. This document has not been preserved, but a number of citations during the decades immediately following indicate its contents, and it is likely that it was the source of the much interpolated Fragmentum Fantuzzianum, which probably dates from 778 to 80. In the original document of Quiercy Pepin promised to restore to the pope the lands of central Italy conquered by Aistulf, especially in the exarchate and the Roman Duchy, and of a number of patrimonies in the Lombard Kingdom and the Duchies of Spoleto and Benevento. These lands had yet to be conquered by Pepin, so his promise was on condition that he did.

In the summer of 754 Pepin and the pope began their march into Italy, and forced King Aistulf, who had shut himself up in his capital, to sue for peace. The Lombard promised to give up the cities of the exarchate and of the Pentapolis, which had been last conquered, to make no further attacks upon or to evacuate the Duchy of Rome and the northwest Italian districts of Venetia and Istria, and also acknowledged the sovereignty of the Franks. For the cities in the exarchate and in the Pentapolis, which Aistulf promised to return, Pepin executed a separate deed for the pope. This is the first "Donation of 754".

But Pepin had hardly recrossed the Alps on his way home, when Aistulf again advanced against Rome, and lay siege. The pope summoned Pepin to fulfill anew his pledge of loyalty. In 756 Pepin set out with an army against Aistulf and again hemmed him in at Pavia. Aistulf was again compelled to promise to the pope the cities granted him after the first war and, in addition, Commachio at the mouth of the Po. But this time a promise was not sufficient. Pepin's messengers visited the various cities of the exarchate and of the Pentapolis, demanded and received the keys to them, and brought the highest magistrates and most distinguished magnates of these cities to Rome. Pepin executed a new deed of gift for the cities thus surrendered to the pope, and laid it with the keys of the cities on the grave of St. Peter in the Second Donation of 756.

The Byzantine Government naturally did not approve of this result of Frankish intervention. It had hoped to regain possession of the districts that had been wrested from it by the Lombards. But Pepin took up arms, not for the Byzantine emperor, but for the sake of the pope. Kings at that time founded monasteries and endowed them with landed properties, so that prayers might be offered for them there; Pepin wished to provide the pope with temporal territories, so he might be certain of the prayers of the pope. Therefore, when the Byzantine ambassadors came to him before the second expedition of 756 and asked him to return to the emperor the cities taken from the Lombards, he said that to Rome alone would he restore the cities. Thus did Pepin found the States of the Church.

The States of the Church were in a certain sense the only remnant of the Roman Empire in the West which escaped foreign conquerors. Gratefully the Roman population acknowledged that they had escaped subjection to the Lombards. Also, temporal sovereignty guaranteed to the pope some level of independence. Under Pepin's son, Charlemagne, relations with the Lombards became strained again. Adrian I complained that the Lombard king Desiderius had invaded the territories of the States of the Church, and reminded Charlemagne of the promise made at Quiercy. As Desiderius also championed the claims of Charlemagne's nephews, he endangered the unity of the Frankish kingdom, and Charlemagne's own interests therefore bade him to oppose Desiderius. In the autumn of 773 Charlemagne entered Italy and besieged Desiderius at Pavia. While the siege was in progress, Charlemagne went to Rome at Easter, 774, and at the request of the pope renewed the promises made at Quiercy.

Soon after this Desiderius was forced to capitulate, and Charlemagne had himself proclaimed King of the Lombards in his place. Charlemagne's attitude toward the States of the Church now underwent a change. With the title of King of the Lombards he also assumed the title as "Patricius Romanorum", which his father had never used, and read into this title rights which under Pepin had never been associated with it. Moreover, differences of opinion arose between Adrian and Charlemagne concerning the obligations which had been assumed by Pepin and Charlemagne in the document of Quiercy. Adrian construed it to mean that Charlemagne should take an elastic concept of the "res publica Romana" to the extent of giving up not only the conquests of Aistulf in the exarchate and in the Pentapolis, but also earlier conquests of the Lombards in Central Italy, Spoleto and Benevento.

But Charles would not listen to any such interpretation of the document. As both parties were anxious to come to an understanding, an agreement was reached in 781. Charlemagne acknowledged the sovereignty of Adrian in the Duchy of Rome and in the States of the Church founded by Pepin's donations of 754–756. He now executed a new document in which were enumerated all the districts in which the pope was recognized as ruler. The Duchy of Rome (which had not been mentioned in the earlier documents) heads the list, followed by the exarchate and the Pentapolis, augmented by the cities which Desiderius had agreed to surrender at the beginning of his reign (Imola, Bologna, Faenza, Ferrara, Ancona, Osimo and Umana); next the patrimonies were specified in various groups: in the Sabine, in the Spoletan and Beneventan districts, in Calabria, in Tuscany and in Corsica. Charlemagne, however, in his quality of "Patricius", wanted to be considered as the highest court of appeal in criminal cases in the States of the Church. He promised on the other hand to protect freedom of choice in the election of the pope, and renewed the alliance of friendship that had been previously made between Pepin and Stephen II.

The agreement between Charlemagne and Adrian remained undisturbed. In 787 Charlemagne further enlarged the States of the Church by new donations: Capua and a few other frontier cities of the Duchy of Benevento, besides several cities in Lombardy, Tuscany, Populonia, Roselle, Sovana, Toscanella, Viterbo, Bagnorea, Orvieto, Ferento, Orchia, Marta and lastly Città di Castello appear to have been added at that time. This is based upon deductions, since no document survives either from the time of Charlemagne or from that of Pepin. Adrian proved himself no mean politician, and is ranked with Stephen II as the second founder of the States of the Church. His agreement with Charlemagne remained authoritative for the relations of the later popes with the Carolingians and the German emperors. These relations were given a brilliant outward expression by Charlemagne's coronation as emperor in 800.

In the later 9th century, such as during the papacy of Pope John VIII, the papal patrimony was severely threatened.

== Pontifical province ==
From the early 13th century, the Patrimony of Saint Peter was one of the four provinces established by Pope Innocent III as a division of the Ecclesiastical States. It included the part of ancient Tuscia subject to the Apostolic See, i.e. the current province of Viterbo and the district of Civitavecchia.

It was governed by a papal appointed official, the Rector. Subsequently, the presence of a Rector General, coordinator of the activities of the provincial rectors and direct referent of the pontiff is also documented.

The province of Patrimonio was confirmed in the Constitutiones Aegidianae of 1357, issued by Cardinal Egidio Albornoz.

The seat cities of the rectors were Montefiascone and Viterbo.

== List of papal patrimonia ==
Each patrimonium was not necessarily a single unit, but could consist of other lands not joined to the central nucleus (ex corpore patrimoniae).

- Patrimonium Tusciae (bounded by the Via Aurelia and the Via Flaminia, in the northern quadrant of the Agro Romano);
- Patrimonium Tuscie Suburbanum (around Basilica di San Pietro in Vaticano);
- Patrimonium Sabinense or Carseolanum (on the Via Salaria, ending at Farfa Abbey);
- Patrimonium Tiburtinum (bounded by the Via Nomentana and the Via Tiburtina);
- Patrimonium Labicanum (on the Via Labicana, ending at the valley of Aniene);
- Patrimonium Appiae (on the Via Appia, ending at Albano);
- Patrimonium Appiae Suburbanum (around the Basilica di San Giovanni in Laterano);
- Patrimonium Caietanum (around Gaeta);
- Patrimonium Traiectum (on the River Garigliano).

== Sources ==
- (in Italian) AA.VV., Atlante storico-politico del Lazio, Regione Lazio, Editori Laterza, Bari 1996
