= Uma =

Uma may refer to:

== Religion ==
- Uma (goddess), a Hindu goddess also known as Parvati or Gauri

== People ==
- Uma (given name), including a list of people with the name
- Uma (actress) (Uma Shankari, fl from 2000), Indian actress

== Nature ==
- Uma (lizard), the genus of fringe-toed lizards

== Arts and entertainment ==
- Uma (1941 film), a Japanese film also known as Horse
- Uma (2013 film), a 2013 Nepali film by Tsering Rhitar Sherpa
- Uma (2018 film), an Indian Bengali-language film
- Uma, in the video game The Witcher 3: Wild Hunt
- Umamusume, characters in the media franchise Umamusume: Pretty Derby
- Uma, in the American children's TV series Oobi
- Miss Uma, a character from the manga series Crayon Shin-chan
- Uma, in the media franchise Descendants
- Uma, part of the Uma Estrela Misteriosa Revelará o Segredo project by Nando Reis
- Uma (game), a wrestling game in Hawaii

== Places ==
- Uma District, Ehime, a district in Japan
- Uma, North Macedonia, a village also known as Huma
- Río Uma, a tributary of the Minho river in Spain

== Other uses ==
- Cyclone Uma, a 1987 tropical cyclone which damaged Port Vila, Vanuatu
- Uma language, an Austronesian language of Sulawesi, Indonesia
- Uma (Gajo house), the traditional house in Sumatra
- Uma longhouse, the traditional house in Siberut, Indonesia

== See also ==
- UMA (disambiguation)
- Una (disambiguation)
- Ooma, a telecommunications company
- Uma Baka' people, in Borneo
- Uma’ Lasan language, of Borneo
