= Constitutiones Sanctæ Matris Ecclesiæ =

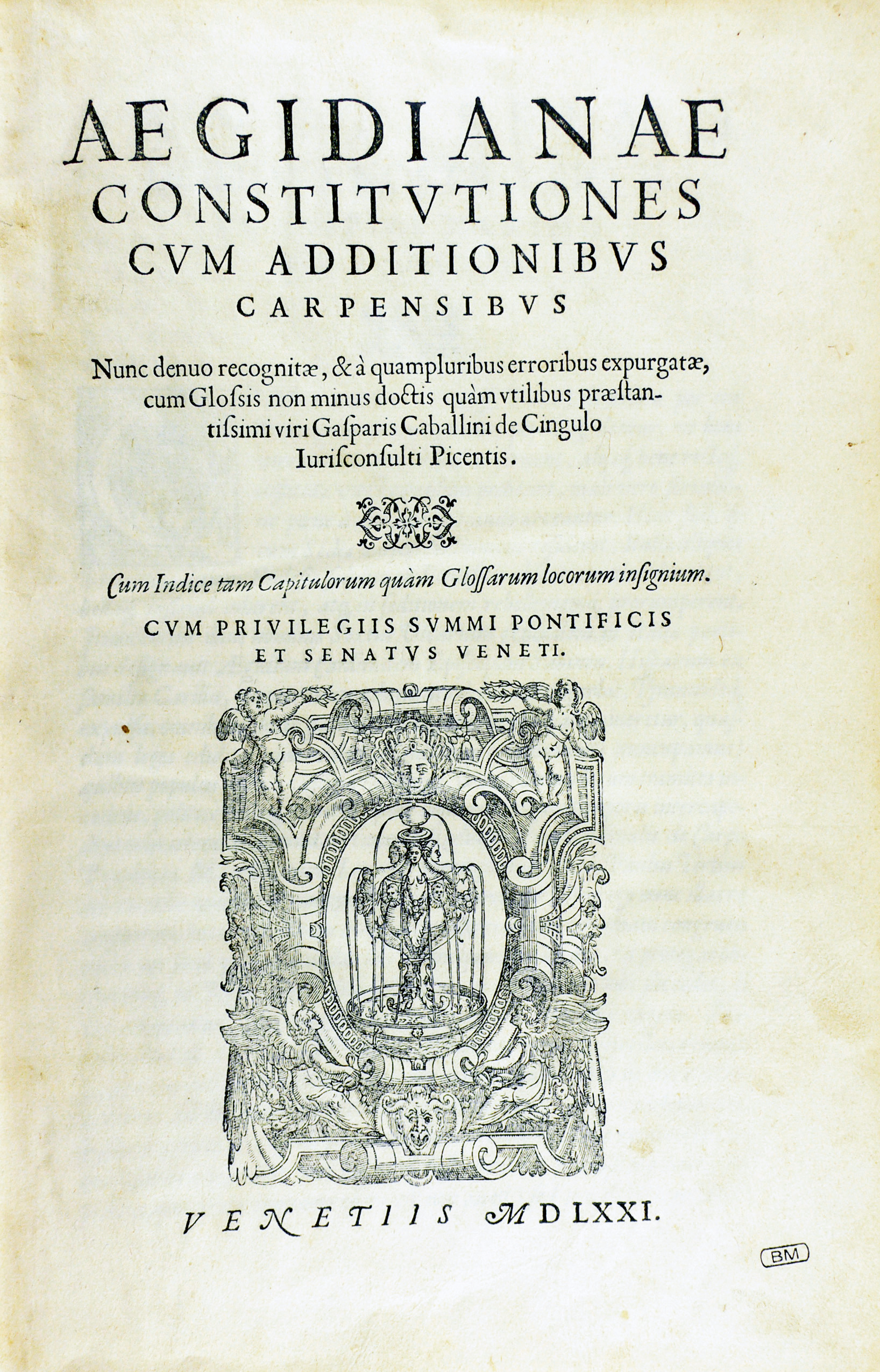
Aegidianae Constitutiones, 1571.

The Constitutiones Sanctæ Matris Ecclesiæ (English: Constitutions of the Holy Mother Church), informally known as the Constitutiones Aegidianae (English: Egidian Constitutions, Italian: Costituzioni egidiane), were six books of law which formed the first historic constitution of the Papal States. They were redacted at Fano by Cardinal Albornoz between 29 April and 1 May 1357 at an assembly of all the vicars of the pontifical territories.

The Constitutiones formed the highest law of a vast stretch of central Italy, including the modern regions of Emilia-Romagna, Marche, Umbria, and Lazio, until 1816. Under the Constitutiones, the Papal States were divided into five provinces: the Duchy of Spoleto, March of Ancona, Romagna, Patrimony of Saint Peter, and the Campagne and Maritime Province. Each province fell under the direction of a rector appointed personally by the pope. Each rector was charged with the selection of a council of seven justices for his province. The purpose of the council was to counter corruption and each justice had to belong to a different province than the one to which he was appointed. The rector also had the power to name the chief of the armed forces of his province, but was barred from bestowing the office on one of his relatives.
