= Collegio di Spagna =

Coordinates: 44°29′26″N 11°20′18″E

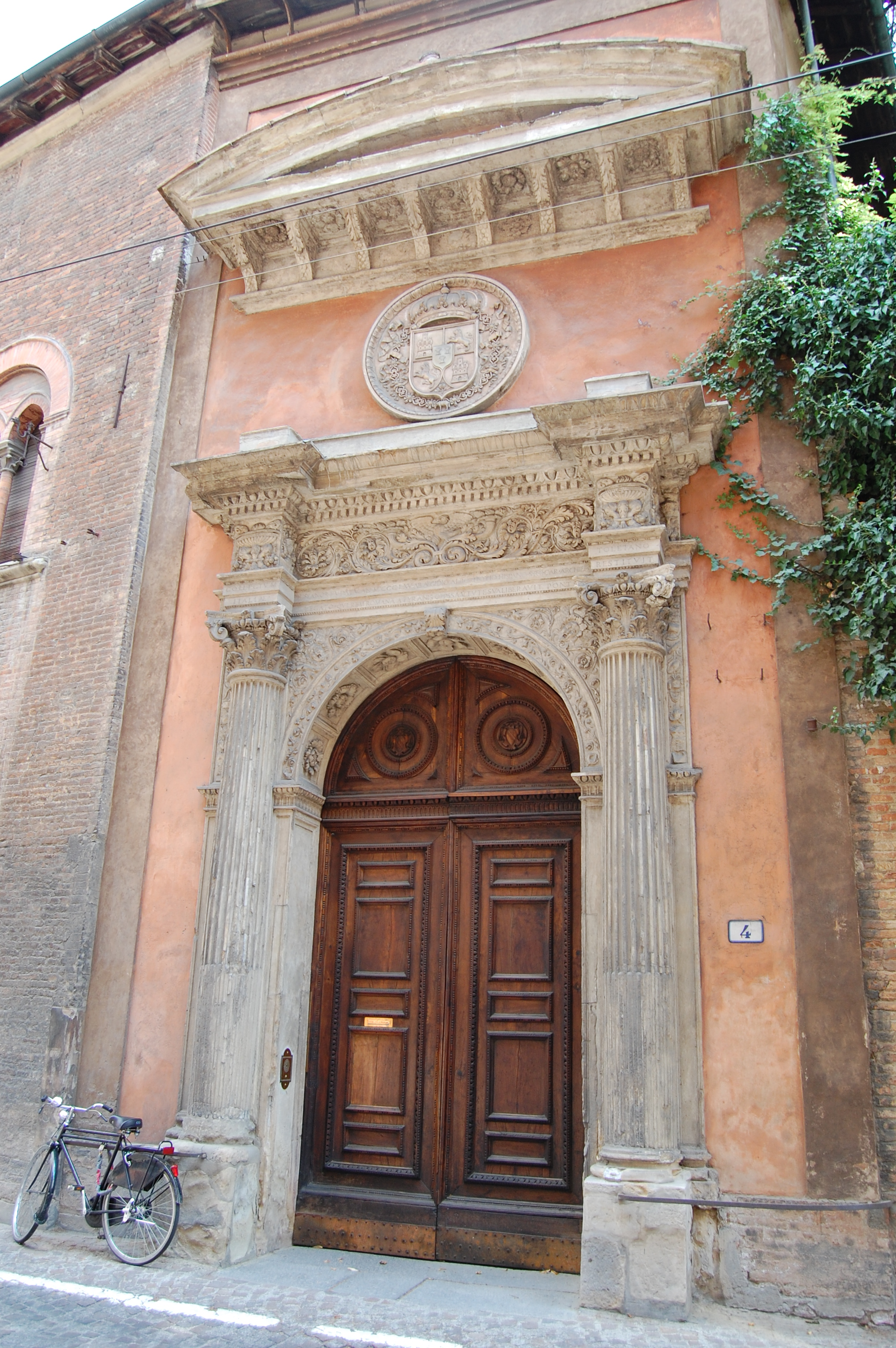
Main door of the Collegio di Spagna.

The Collegio di Spagna (Royal Spanish College or Royal College of Spain in Bologna) (officially Real Colegio Mayor de San Clemente de los Españoles) is a college for Spanish students at the University of Bologna, Italy, which has been functioning since the 14th century. Its full original name in English translation was the Royal College of Saint Clement of the Spaniards. It has been under the Royal patronage of the Spanish Crown since 1488, as authorized by Pope Innocent VIII.

== History ==
The college was founded in 1364 by the Cardinal Gil Álvarez Carrillo de Albornoz (1310–1367) and built in 1365–1367. The Collegio was the model for the colleges founded at the University of Salamanca, starting in the late 14th century (notably the Colegio Viejo, 1401) and at other Spanish universities in the following couple of centuries. Since 1488, all Spanish monarchs have reconfirmed its Royal patronage. It is arguably the oldest institution carrying the name Spanish outside of Spain, predating the union of the crowns that led to the formation of the Kingdom of Spain.

In 1923, a correspondent for The Times, who calls the college a "picturesque Spanish oasis in the centre of old Bologna", reports of the visit of the King and Queen of Spain to the college. King Alfonso participated in the unveiling of a tablet recording the visit of the royal couple and another one noting the name of two famous former students of the college, Ignatius of Loyola and Miguel de Cervantes.

== Art and architecture ==
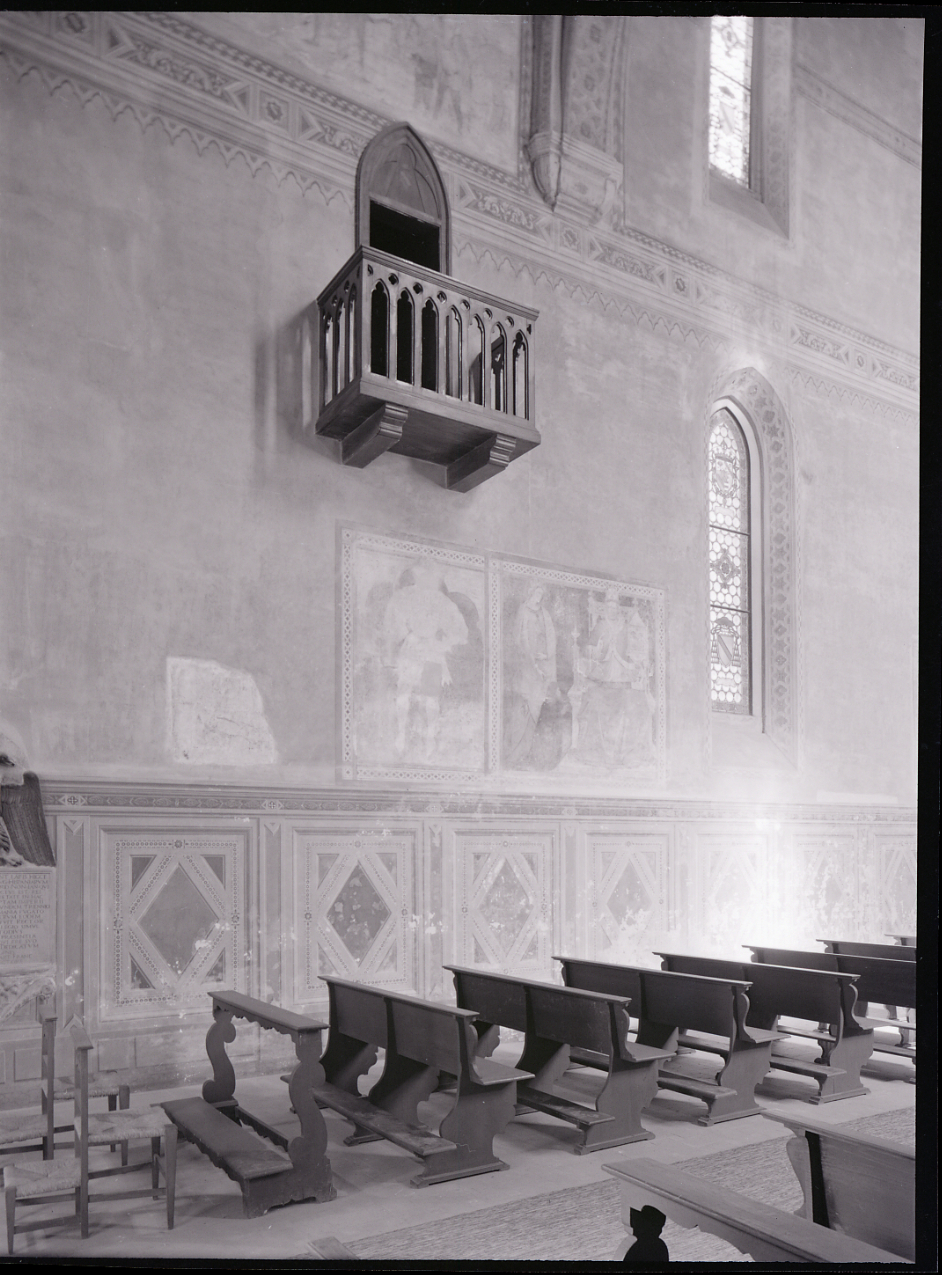
Interior of the Saint Clement's Chapel. Photo by Paolo Monti, 1970.

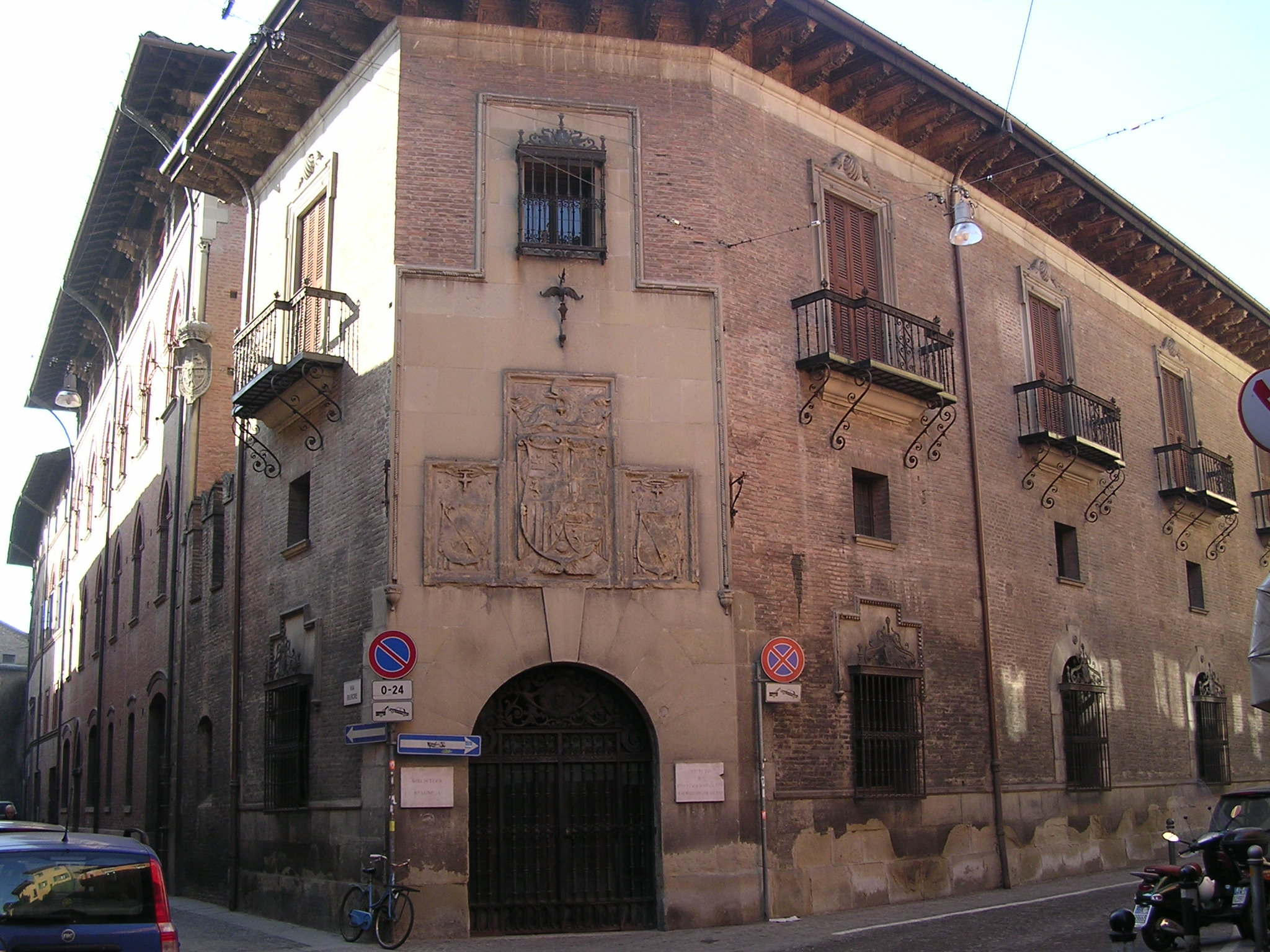
Exterior view.

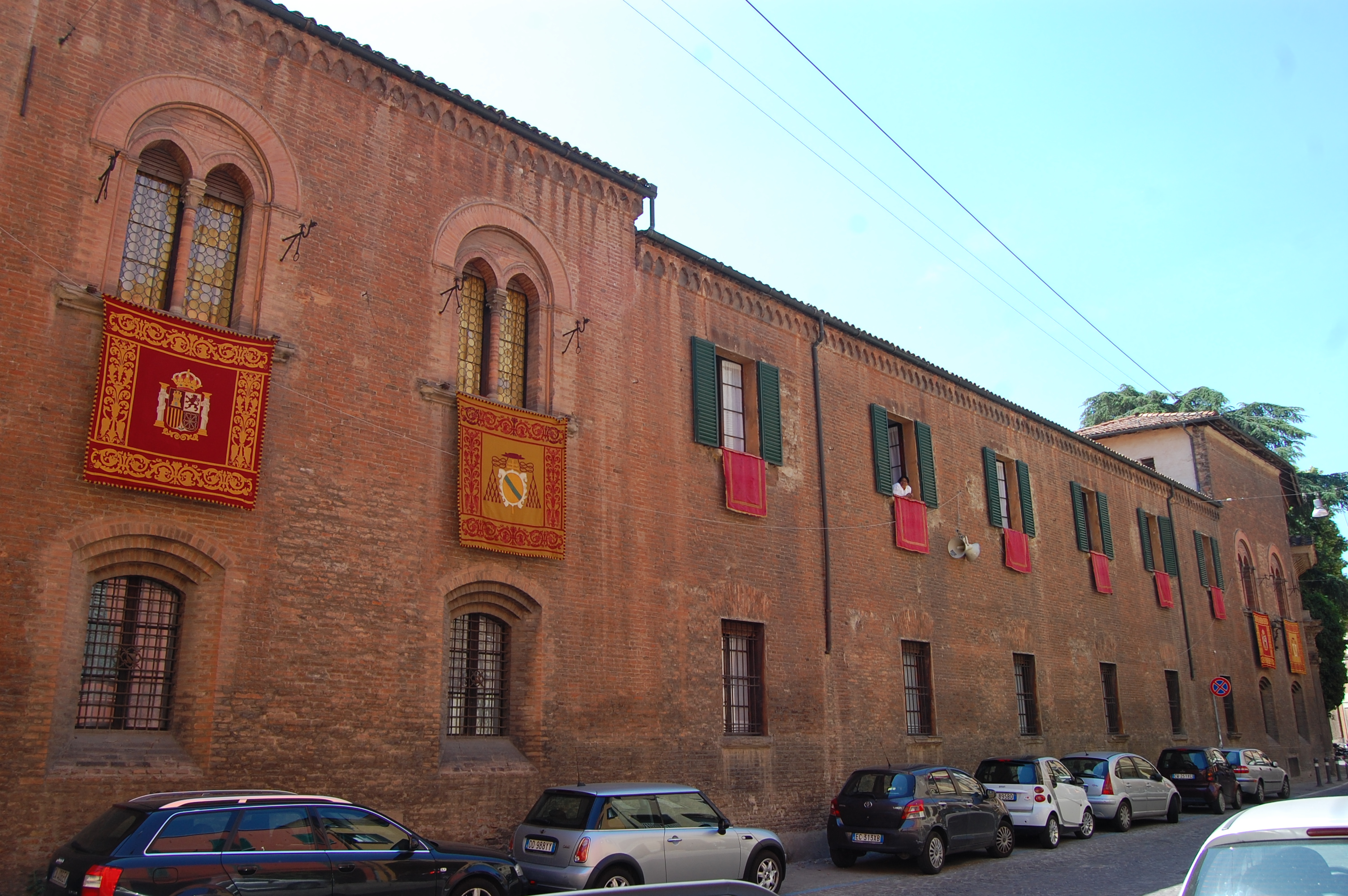
Exterior view.

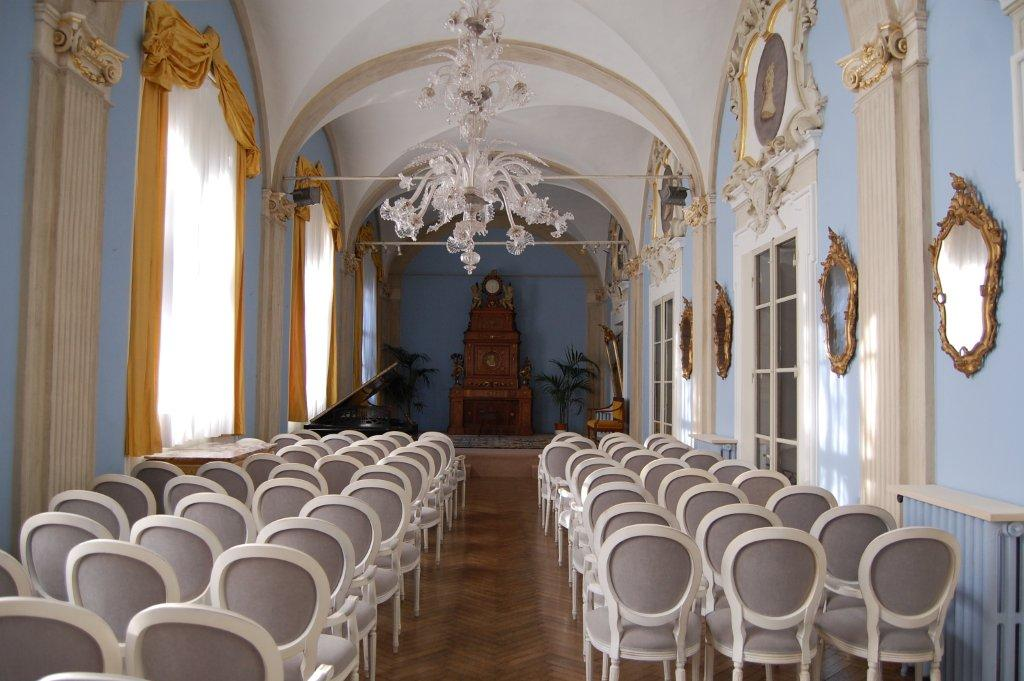
Music Hall.

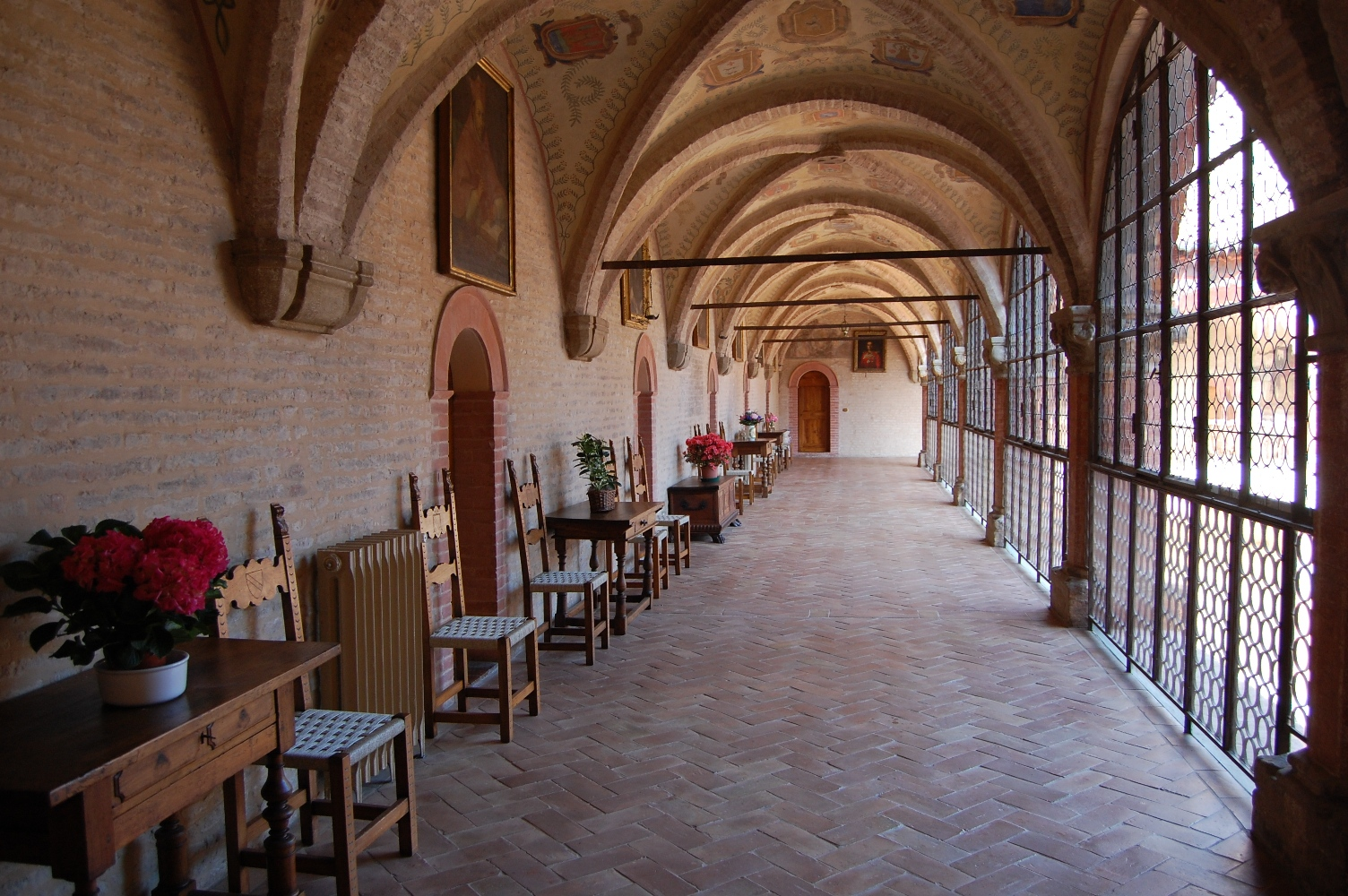
North Gallery.

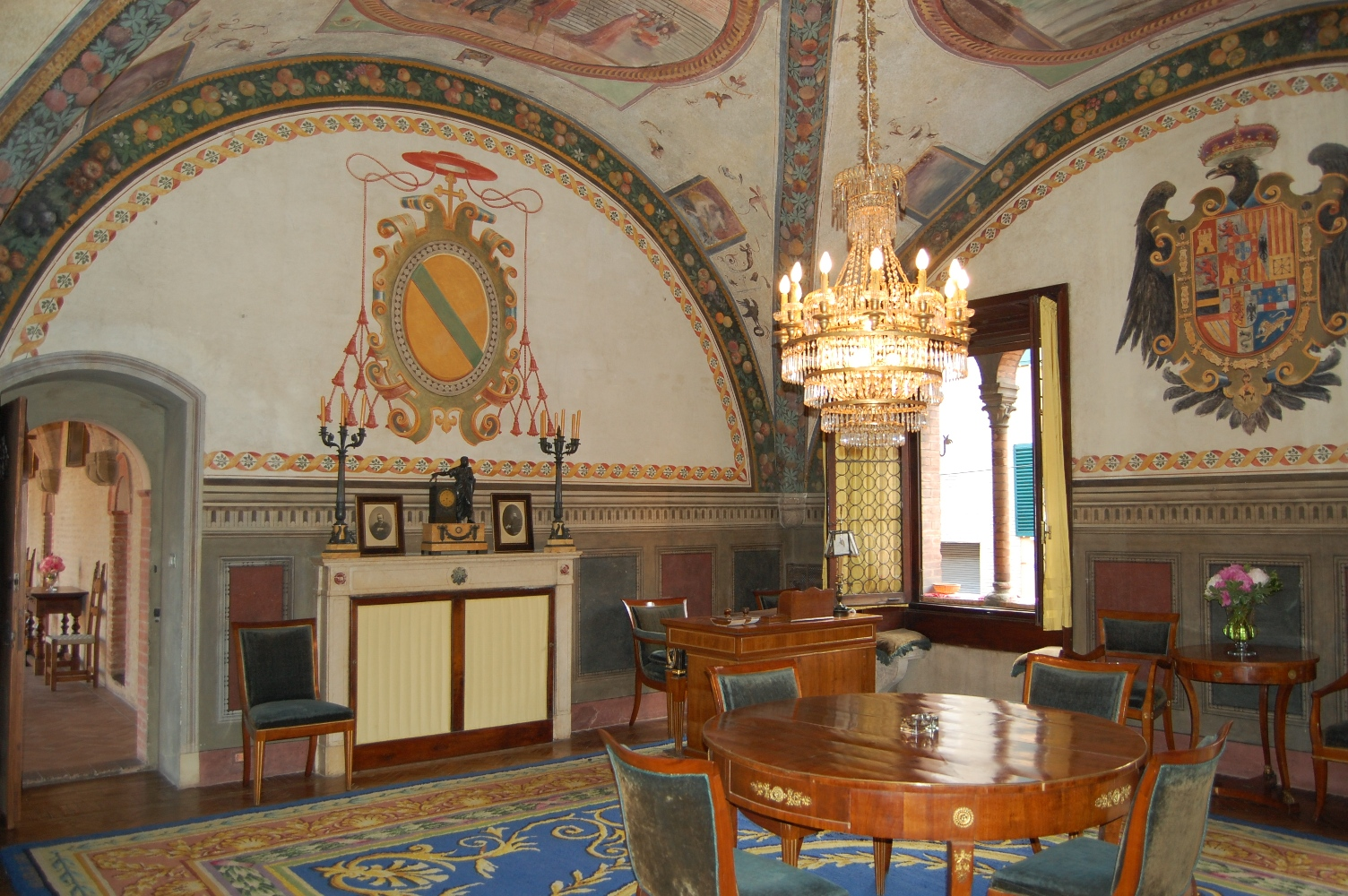
Royal Antechamber.

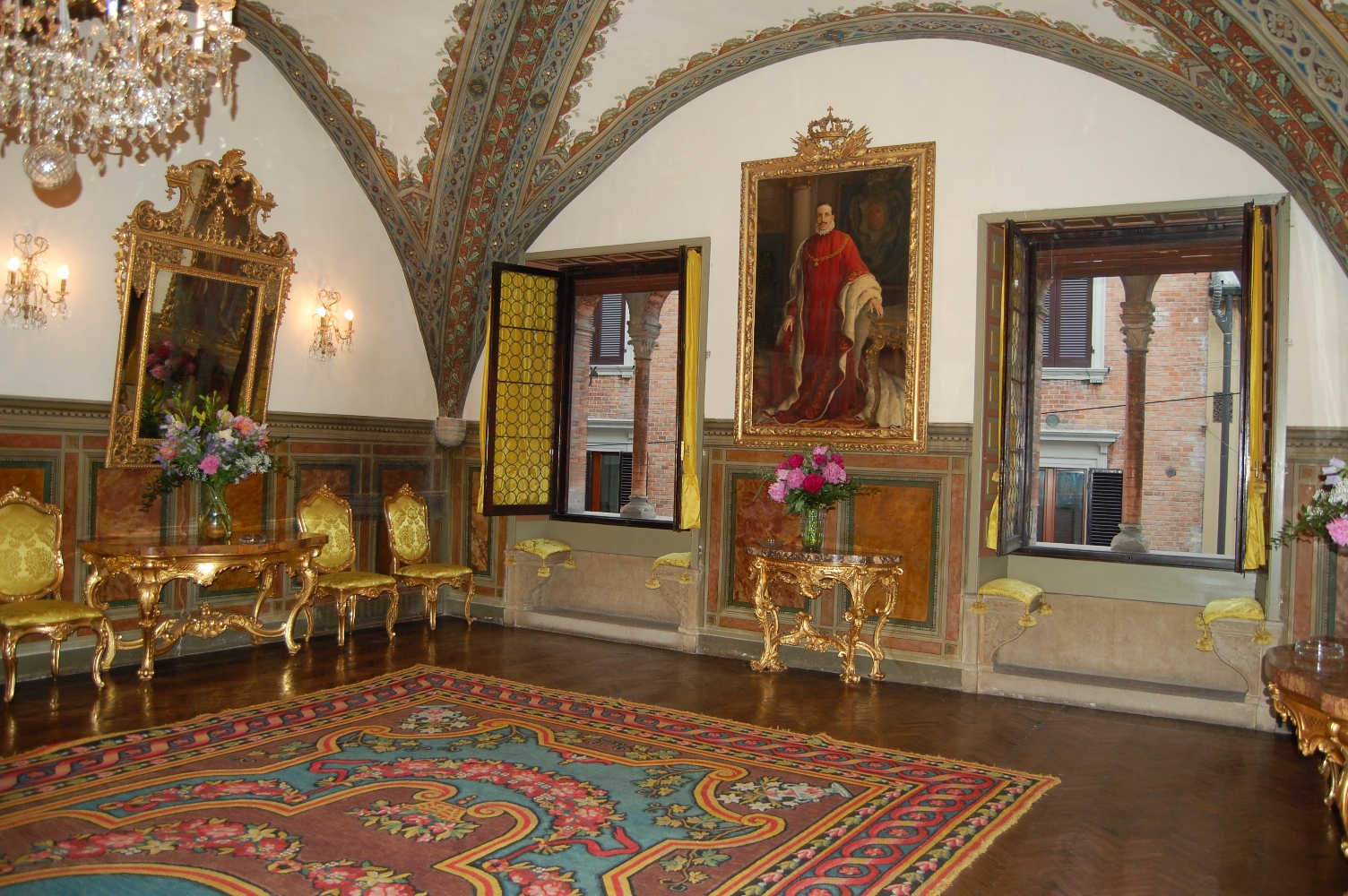
Room of the Argonauts

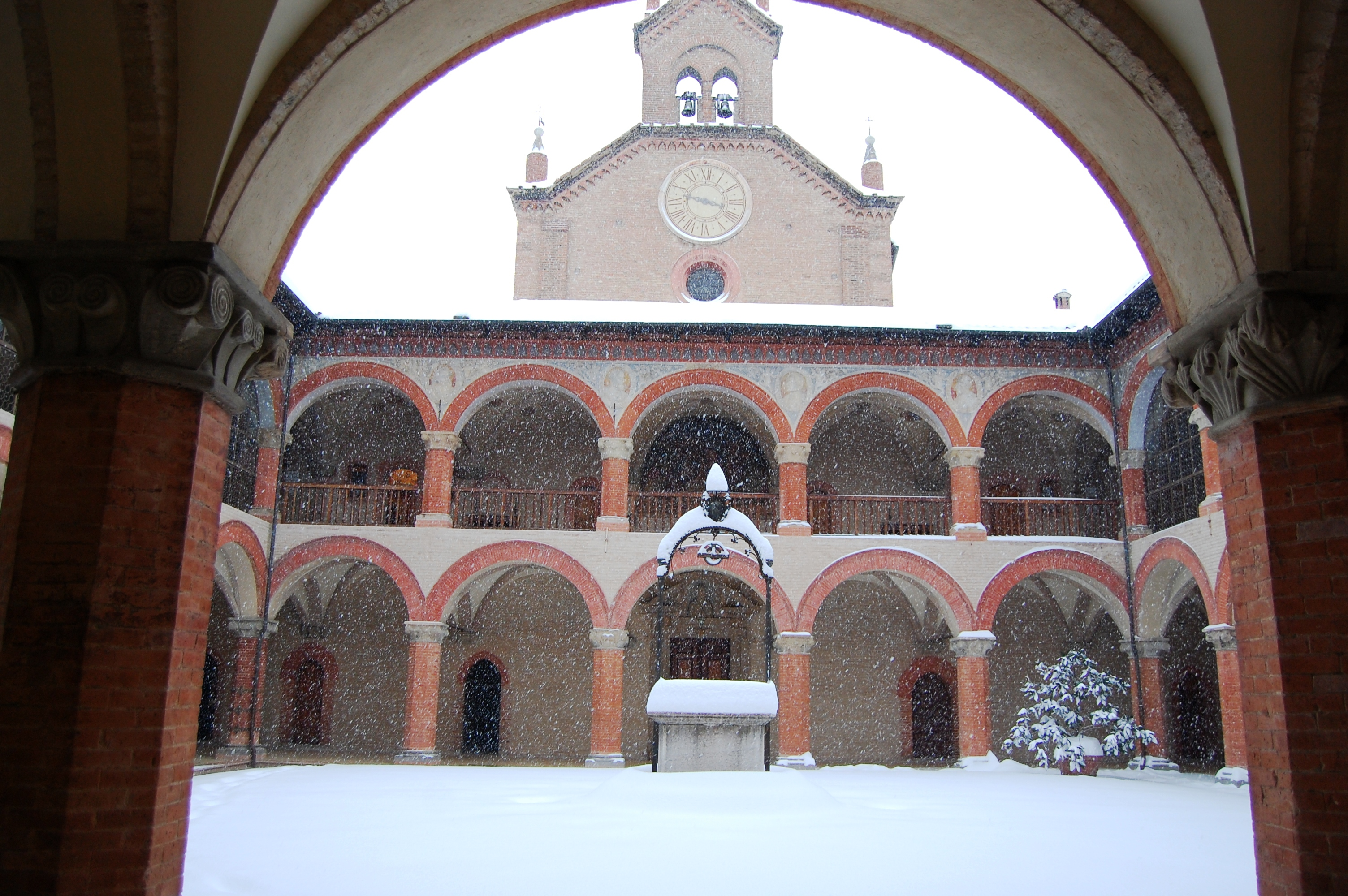
View of the court.

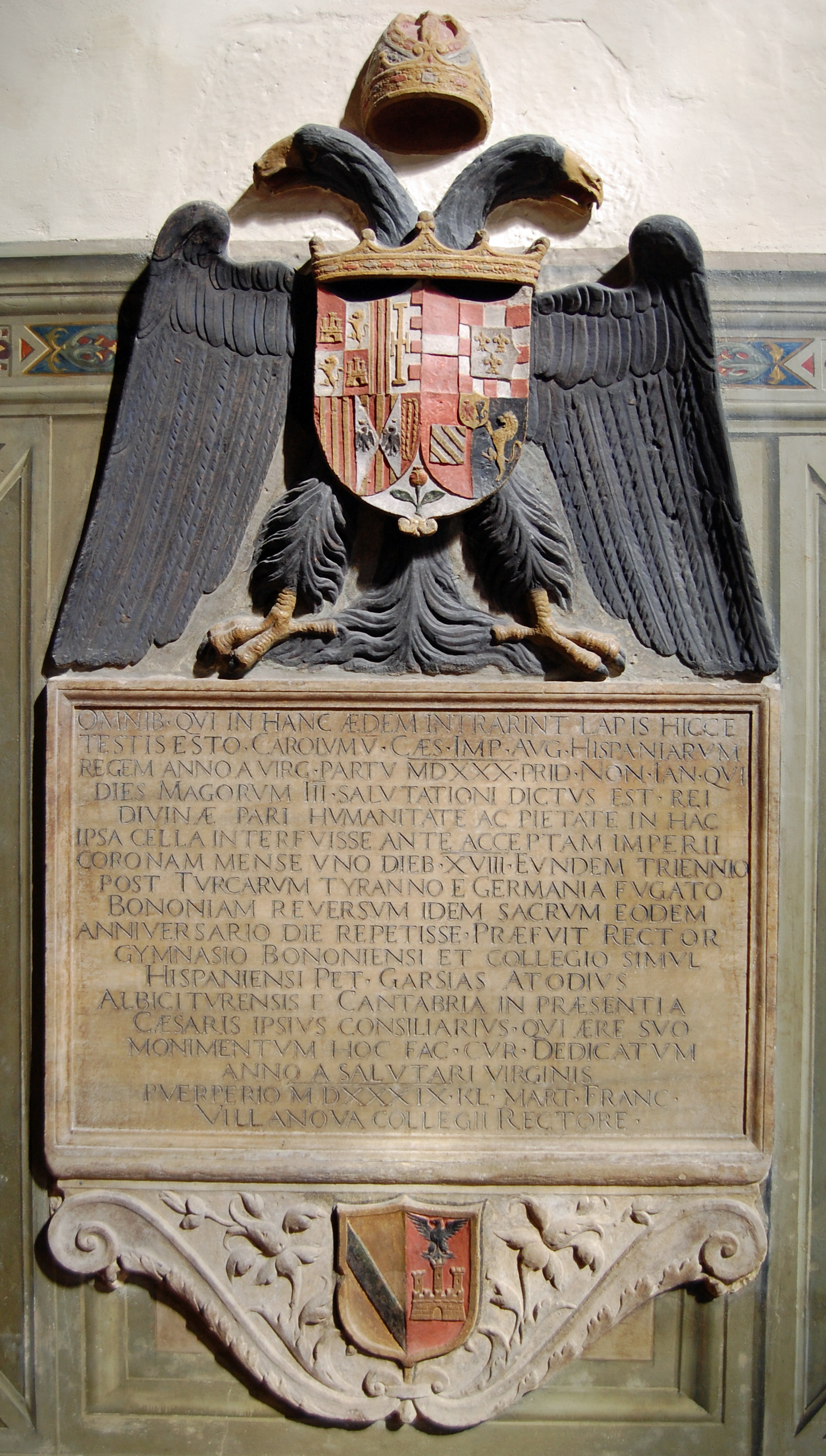
Plaque of Charles V.

It consists of a building in two floors with arcades surrounding a courtyard. The exterior has later been partly remodelled in renaissance style. The architecture of the Collegio is peculiarly Italian in the use of the loggia, but shares a characteristic of medieval college buildings in England and France, in being arranged around a central rectangular court. Bas reliefs of the coat of arms of Spain are located above the two main entryways.

The portico once had frescoes by Annibale Carracci, but a travellers guide published in 1857 reported them having "almost disappeared". The guidebook goes on to describe two frescoes by Bartolommeo Bagnacavallo:

In the upper loggia is the fine fresco by Bagnacavallo, representing the Virgin and Child, St. Elizabeth, St. John, and St. Joseph, with an angel above scattering flowers, and the Cardinal founder kneeling in veneration. But the great fresco of Bagnacavallo, representing Charles V crowned in S. Petronio by Clement VII, although much injured, is by far the most interesting work, because it is a contemporary record. From this circumstance we may regard the picture as a series of authentic portraits, in the precise costume of the period.

The book also mentions artwork in the chapel: "some frescoes by C. Procaccini and a Sta. Marguerite by G. Francia."

The frescoes by Camillo Procaccini in the apse the S. Clemente chapel were painted in 1582 but destroyed in 1914. The S. Clemente also features an altarpiece by Marco Zoppo from the mid-15th century.

== News ==
=== 2012 Europa Nostra Award ===
In 2012 the Royal Spanish College at Bologna was awarded with the Europa Nostra Price on its conservation category. The Jury declared: "There could hardly be a finer example of our shared European heritage: a medieval college for Spanish students in an Italian university – the oldest university in the World – using the Italian motif of a loggia around a courtyard, reminiscent of the collegiate architecture of England or France. The Jury admired the beauty and detail of this meticulous restoration, especially of the frescoes, and the courage and determination shown in sustaining both momentum and funding over such a long period." Also, the Jury underlined the effort on the restoration works by the college, without any official subvention during the period 1978–2010, when important frescoes were discovered inside the building: “The aim of the long restoration work undertaken was to achieve an architectural consolidation and the recuperation of the forgotten artistic qualities of a palace that holds an exceptional meaning for European culture: the Royal Spanish College in Bologna. The College was founded in 1364 by Cardinal Gil de Albornoz, and endowed with the Royal title by Emperor Charles V in 1530. It is the only university college in continental Europe to have remained active from the Middle Age until today. After a long and costly period of restoration initiated in 1978, the works finished in December 2010, with the discovery and restoration of the frescoes in the royal chamber and antechamber. The magnitude of the historical research, as well as the scope of the works and the absence of external subsidies must be taken into account when considering the 32-year-long restoration, during which the most difficult task was the financial restructuring of the foundation’s heritage.”
