= Una (given name) =

Una is a feminine given name with various origins. As used by Edmund Spenser in The Faerie Queene, the name is derived from the Latin unus, meaning one. Una is a currently popular name for girls in Serbia, where the name also has associations with the Una River.

Úna is an Irish language version that may be derived from the Irish word uan 'lamb'. An alternative spelling is Oona. The Scottish Gaelic form is Ùna.

== People with the name ==
- Una Abell-Brinker (1874–1952), American actress
- Una Stella Abrahamson (1922–1999), English-born Canadian artist and writer
- Una Baines (born 1957), British keyboard player and member of The Fall
- Una Mabel Bourne (1882–1974), Australian pianist and composer
- Una Budd (born 1975), Irish international cricketer
- Una Carter (1890–1954), New Zealand cooking teacher, demonstrator and writer
- Una Chi (1942–2021), Italian translator and writer
- Una S. T. Clarke (born 1934), American politician
- Una Crawford O'Brien (fl. from 1998), Irish actor
- Una Deerbon (1882–1972), Australian studio potter
- Una Ellis-Fermor (1894–1958), English literary critic and author
- Una Lucy Fielding (1888–1969), Australian neuroanatomist
- Una Hale (1922–2005), Australian operatic soprano
- Una Hanbury (1904–1990), American sculptor
- Una Harkin (born 1983), Irish Gaelic and association football player
- Una Healy (born 1981), Irish singer-songwriter and member of the girlgroup The Saturdays
- Una B. Herrick (1863–1950), American educator
- Una Hunt (1876–1957), American author
- Una Jagose (fl. from 1990), New Zealand lawyer
- Una Leacy (born 1988), Irish camogie player
- Una Marson (1905–1965), Jamaican feminist
- Una McCormack (born 1972), British-Irish academic, scriptwriter and novelist
- Una McLean (born 1930), Scottish actress and comedian
- Una Merkel (1903–1986), American actress
- Una Morris (born 1947), Jamaican sprinter, physician and restaurateur
- Una Mullally (born 1983), Irish journalist and broadcaster
- Una O'Brien, British senior civil servant 2010–2016
- Una O'Connor (actress) (1880–1959), Irish actress
- Úna O'Connor (camogie) (1938–2020), Irish camogie player
- Una O'Donoghue (born 1981), Irish camogie player
- Una O'Dwyer (camogie), Irish camogie player
- Una O'Hagan (born 1962), Irish author and journalist
- Una O'Keefe (born 1954), widow of Harry Nilsson
- Una Paisley (1922–1977), Australian cricket player
- Úna Palliser (fl. from 2002), Irish-born musician
- Una Platts (1908–2005), New Zealand artist and art historian
- Una Pope-Hennessy (1875–1949), British historian
- Una Power, English-born Irish card reader and author
- Una Raymond-Hoey (born 1996), Irish cricketer
- Una Ross, 25th Baroness de Ros (1879–1956), British peer
- Una Ryan (born 1941), British-American biologist
- Una M. Ryan (born 1966), Irish biochemist
- Una Stubbs (1937–2021), English actress
- Una Vincenzo, Lady Troubridge (1887–1963), British sculptor and translator
- Una Troy (1910–1993), Irish novelist
- Una Watters (1918–1965), Irish artist and librarian
- Una White (died 1997), Jamaican-British nurse

== Fictional characters with the name ==
- Una, a character in The Faerie Queene by Edmund Spenser
- Una Hamilton, a character in East of Eden by John Steinbeck
- Una, one codename of the DC Comics superheroine Luornu Durgo
- Una (Stardust), a character in Stardust by Neil Gaiman
- Una Chin-Riley, nicknamed "Number One", in the Star Trek franchise
- Otomachi Una, a Vocaloid software voicebank introduced in Vocaloid 4
- Una Nancy Owen, a character in And Then There Were None by Agatha Christie
- Una Spencer, the main character in the play Blackbird by David Harrower
- Una Meredith, a character in Rainbow Valley by Lucy Maud Montgomery
- Saint Una Everlasting, the titular character of The Everlasting by Alix E. Harrow

== See also ==
- List of Irish-language given names
- Una (disambiguation)
