= Una Assembly constituency =

Una Assembly constituency may refer to

- Una, Gujarat Assembly constituency
- Una, Himachal Pradesh Assembly constituency
