= Uña =

Uña, Spain
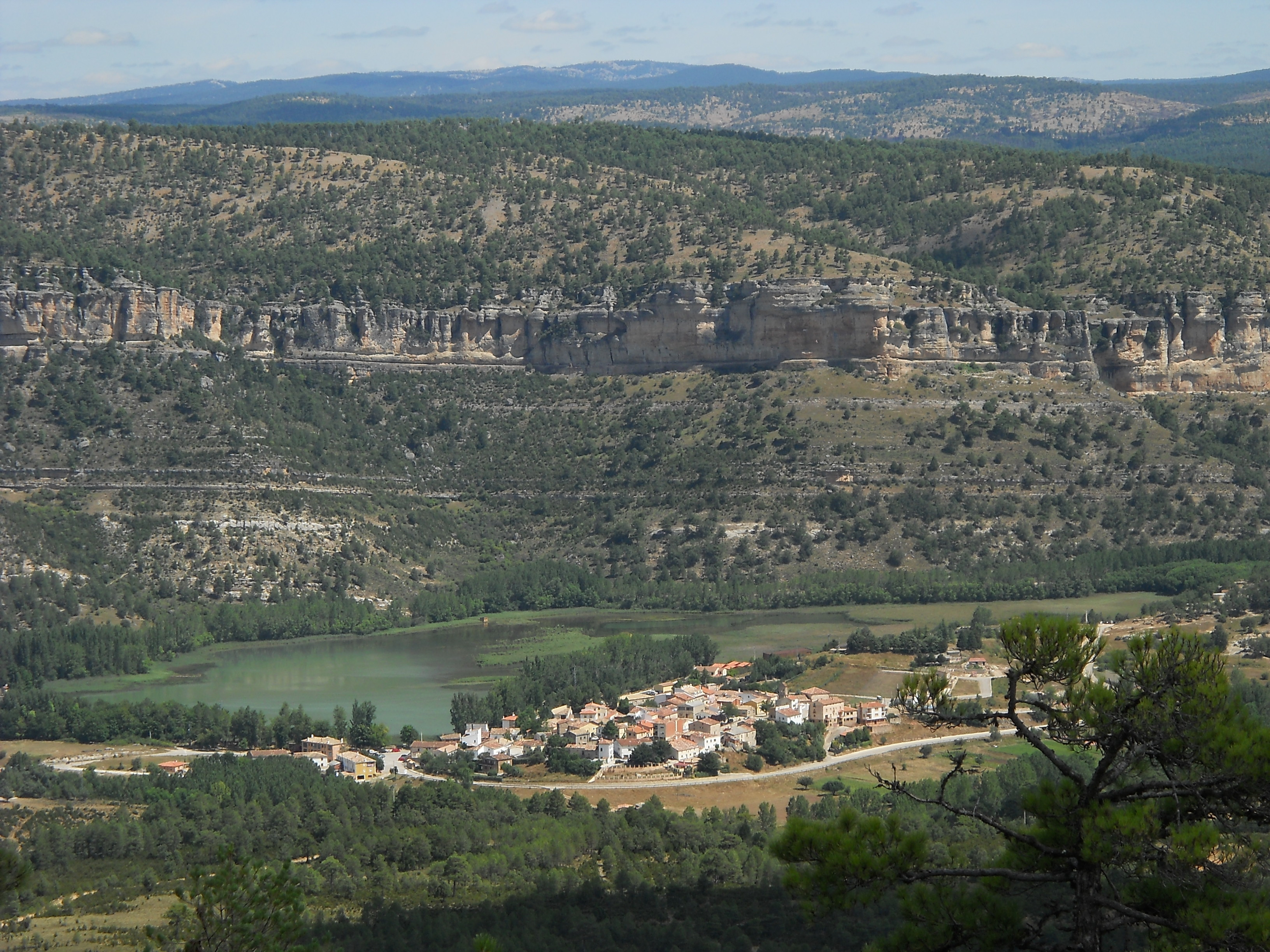

- Coat of arms

- Location within Spain Location within Castilla-La Mancha
- Coordinates: 40.2260°N 1.9723°W
- Country: Spain
- Autonomous community: Castile-La Mancha
- Province: Cuenca
- Municipality: Uña

Area
  - Total: 23 km^{2} (8.9 sq mi)

Population (2025-01-01)
  - Total: 90
  - Density: 3.9/km^{2} (10/sq mi)
- Time zone: UTC+1 (CET)
  - Summer (DST): UTC+2 (CEST)

Uña is a municipality located in the province of Cuenca, Castile-La Mancha, Spain. According to the 2004 census (INE), the municipality has a population of 138 inhabitants.
