= Oona =

Oona is a feminine given name. It is an anglicisation of the Irish-language name Úna. Apart from in Ireland, it is also a popular name in Finland.

== People with the name ==
=== Oona ===
- Oona Airola (born 1988), Finnish actress
- Oona Brown (born 2004), American ice dancer
- Oona Chaplin (born 1986), Spanish actress and dancer, granddaughter of Charlie Chaplin and Oona O'Neill
- Oona Doherty (born 1986), British dancer and choreographer
- Oona Eisenstadt, American religious studies scholar
- Oona Grimes (born 1957), British artist and lecturer
- Oona Hart, American model and actress
- Oona A. Hathaway (born 1972), American law professor
- Oona Kauste (born 1988), Finnish curler
- Oona King (born 1967), British politician
- Oona Kivelä (born 1983), Finnish pole dancer
- Oona Koukkula (born 2003), Finnish ice hockey player
- Oona Laurence (born 2002), American actress
- Oona Louhivaara (born 1987), Finnish actress
- Oona O'Neill (1925–1991), fourth and final wife of Charlie Chaplin
- Oona Orpana (2001), Finnish tennis player
- Oona Ounasvuori, Finnish figure skater
- Oona Parviainen (1977), Finnish ice hockey player and coach
- Oona Sevenius (2004), Finnish footballer
- Oona Siren (2001), Finnish footballer
- Oona Sormunen (born 1989), Finnish javelin thrower

=== Oonah ===
- Oonah Keogh (1903–1989), Irish woman who became the first female member of the Dublin Stock Exchange
- Oonah McFee (1916–2006), Canadian novelist and short story writer
- Oonah Shannahan (1921–2022), New Zealand netball player

=== Oonagh ===
- Oonagh (singer) (born 1990 as Senta-Sofia Delliponti), German singer
- Oonagh Guinness (1910–1995), Anglo-Irish socialite, society hostess and art collector
- Oonagh McDonald (born 1938), British businesswoman

== Fictional people with the name ==
=== Mononym ===
- Oona (or Oonagh), wife of Finvarra or Fionn mac Cumhaill and queen of the fairies in the mythology of Ireland, Scotland, and the Isle of Man

- Oona, the protagonist of the Irish TV series Puffin Rock
- Oona, from Nick Jr.'s animated TV series Bubble Guppies
- Oona, a character in the movie Timer
- Oona, the pixie in the movie Legend
- Oona, the mother of the protagonist in The Flight Before Christmas (2008 film)

=== Titled ===
- Lady Oonagh, a bad stepmother character in Juliet Marillier's Daughter of the Forest
- Lady Una, a fairy character in Neil Gaiman's Stardust
- Oona, Queen of the Fae, from the Shadowmoor block of collectible card game Magic: The Gathering
- Queen Oona, a character in Disenchantment

=== Given name ===
- Oonagh Mullarkey, from the Marvel universe
- Oonagh O'Dwyer, an Irish woman who first appears in Dorothy Dunnett's historical novel Queen's Play (1964), second of the Lymond Chronicles
- Oona von Bek, a character in Michael Moorcock's fantasy novels, daughter of Elric of Melnibone
- Oonagh von Bek, a character in Michael Moorcock's fantasy novels, granddaughter of Elric of Melnibone
- Oona, a reoccurring character in the Disney Jr. show Sofia the First.

== See also ==
- List of Irish-language given names
