= Ukrainian Museum-Archives =

Ukrainian Museum-Archives (UMA)
- Established: 1952 (members); 1977 (public)
- Location: 1202 Kenilworth Avenue, Tremont, Cleveland, Ohio
- Coordinates: 41°28′48″N 81°41′25″W
- Type: Heritage museum
- Collection size: 25,000+ pieces
- Founder: Leonid Bachynsky; Alexander Fedynsky
- Executive director: Paul Burlij
- Director: Andrii Fedynskyi
- President: Taras Mahlay
- Chairperson: Kristina Kvartsyana
- Curator: Aniza Kraus
- Website: umacleveland.org

The Ukrainian Museum-Archives (UMA) opened privately in 1952 and publicly, as a non-profit, in 1977. Housed in a one-time convent for Ukrainian nuns turned one-time home for Ukrainian boy scouts, the three-story late 19th-century home is located in Cleveland's historic Tremont neighborhood. There, two displaced Ukrainian scholars "took on the mission of collecting and preserving items from Ukrainian history and culture during an era when this kind of material was being deliberately destroyed in the Soviet Ukraine."

Their holdings now contain both a library with 45,000 books and 1,800 unique periodicals and one of the most extensive collections of Displaced Persons (DP) materials published in post-WWII European DP camps. It also contains a wide-ranging collection of archival ephemera, with tens of thousands of posters, postcards, photographs, stamps, and currency, and an extensive collection of recordings, with more than 2,000 rare 78 rpm and LP records. Its art collection spans both the work of renowned fine artists like sculptor Alexander Archipenko and painter-printmaker Jacques Hnizdovsky and traditional folk art, such as pysanky (Easter eggs), embroidery, and woodcarvings.

Considered a world-class archival leader, the UMA has partnered with the "United States Holocaust Memorial Museum, the National Academy of Sciences in Ukraine, and other institutions interested in digitizing its hidden gems." In 2020, it also partnered with the Department of Modern and Contemporary History of Foreign Countries at Taras Shevchenko National University of Kyiv and the Ukrainian Association of American Studies. Together, they published Sharing America’s Story with Ukraine: The Voice of America’s Ukrainian Service, 1949-2019, a series of essays and research papers on the 70th anniversary of the Ukrainian Service of the Voice of America (VOA). Describing the project, the UMA briefly encapsulates Ukraine's intellectual journey:

For seven decades—from the dark days of the Cold War to the declaration of Ukraine’s independence to the Orange Revolution and the Euromaidan Revolution of Dignity—millions of Ukrainians have been tuning in to VOA to hear America’s message of freedom, democracy, rule of law, respect for national identity and Western security and solidarity.

== U.S.-Ukraine Agreement ==
In 1998, the Government of Ukraine "requested that the UMA prepare a pilot project that has since been incorporated into the U.S.-Ukraine Agreement on the Protection and Preservation of Cultural Heritage." The UMA, Ohio State University and Cleveland State University then offered courses on Ukrainian History and Culture. That allowed the UMA to apply for federal grants, and subsequently "gave the museum the seed money to build the archival building, allowing it to store collections in a properly regulated environment."
