= Dittrick Museum of Medical History =

Museum in Cleveland, Ohio

- "Global Politics of Reproduction" class from The College of Wooster visiting The Dittrick Museum of Medical History.

- Location within Northeast Ohio Dittrick Museum of Medical History (Ohio) Dittrick Museum of Medical History (the United States)
- Established: 1898; 1926 (current location)
- Location: 11000 Euclid Avenue; Cleveland, Ohio 44106
- Coordinates: 41°30′21.5″N 81°36′30.5″W
- Type: Medicine
- Curator: Amanda Mahoney
- Public transit access: Adelbert Road
- Website: artsci.case.edu/dittrick/museum/

The Dittrick Museum of Medical History is a Medical museum, part of the Dittrick Medical History Center of the College of Arts and Sciences of Case Western Reserve University, Cleveland, Ohio. The Dittrick Medical History Center is dedicated to the study of the history of medicine through a collection of rare books, museum artifacts, archives, and images. The museum was established in 1898 by the Cleveland Medical Library Association and today functions as an interdisciplinary study center. It is housed in the Allen Memorial Medical Library on the campus of Case Western Reserve University in Cleveland, Ohio's University Circle.

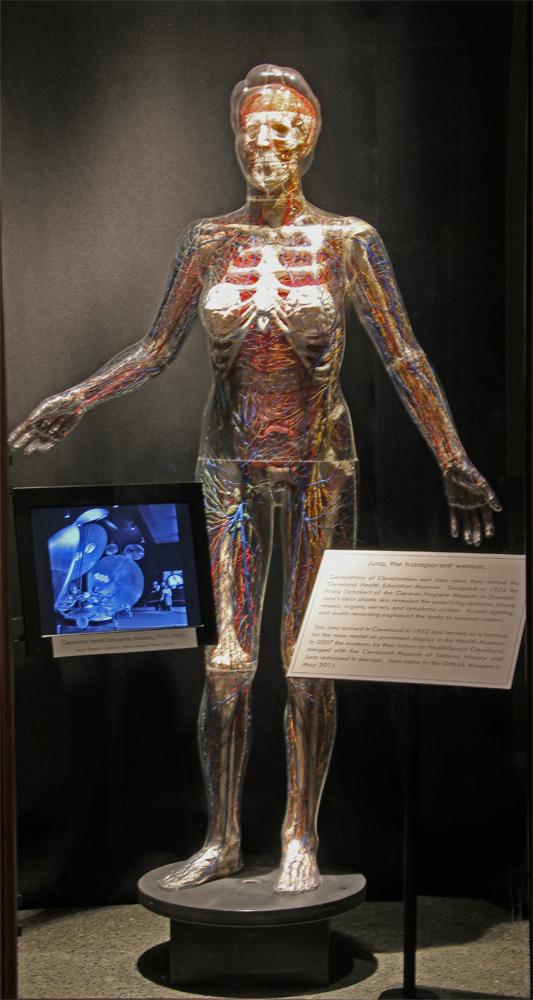
Exhibit on the Cleveland Health Museum featuring Juno the "invisible woman" and historic photos from 1943 through the 1960s.

== History ==
The Dittrick started as a collection about doctors and the medical profession and has been transformed by the artifacts that the curator and founder provided in attempt to document the advancement of medical history in relation to instruments and technology. Since the foundation and initial intent of the founders the Dittrick Museum has become more analytical of medical technology of the past and seeks to study the doctor-patient relationships throughout time. A prominent figure in making the Dittrick Museum was a man by the name of Dudley Peter Allen who was a surgeon in the late 19th century. In 1894 when the committee for the museum came to be, Allen was a major contributor who donated throughout his life and until he died in 1906. He steadily continued to add to the museum's collection. After his death his wife Elizabeth Severance Allen continued to donate funds in order to build a library in her husband's memory named the Allen Memorial Medical Library as well as a museum. The museum first opened its doors to the public in 1960 and has since maintained this open policy. In 2017, the museum serves as a study center for the College of Arts and Sciences at Case Western Reserve University as well as a museum.

== Notable Figures ==
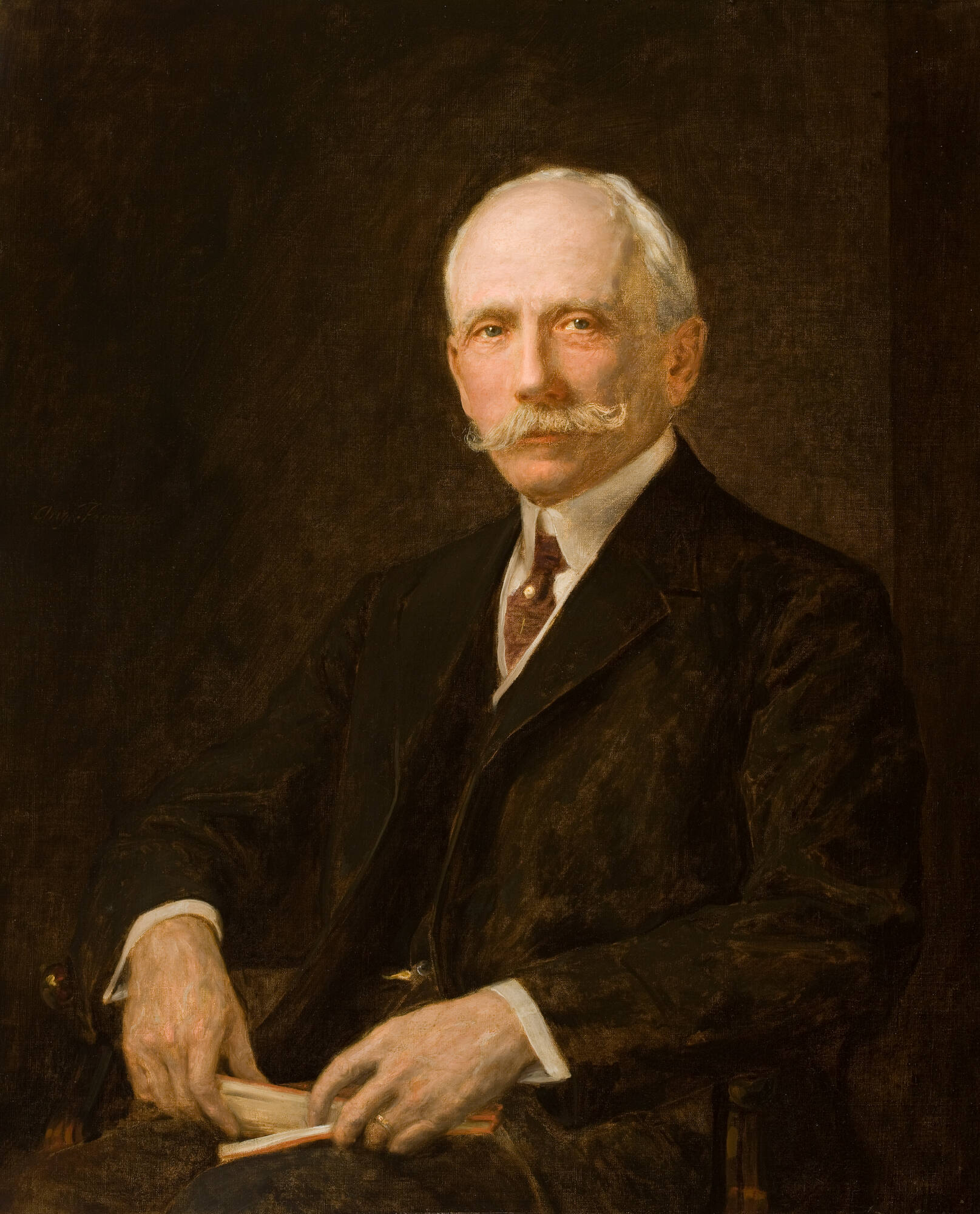
Dudley Peter Allen

James Edmonson served as the curator of the Dittrick Museum 1999-2018.

=== Dudley Peter Allen ===
Allen was born on March 25, 1852, in Kinsman, Ohio. His father Dudley Allen and grandfather Peter Allen were both doctors as well. He went on to study at Oberlin, where he received his A.B. in 1875, and then onto Harvard Medical School where he received his M.D in 1879. After college he chose to return to Ohio and settled in Cleveland in 1883. Allen was one of the first physicians in Cleveland to confine his medical practice to surgery. He went on to have a successful medical career, teaching surgery at Western Reserve Medical College from 1884 to 1890, becoming the Professor of Principles & Practice of Surgery in 1893, and finally the professor emeritus of surgery in 1910 and senior professor of surgery in 1911.

=== James Edmonson ===
James Edmonson is a retired (2017) curator of the Dittrick Museum as well as an alum of the College of Wooster in Wooster, Ohio. He has written many publications such as: American Surgical Instruments: An Illustrated History of Their Manufacture and a Directory of Makers to 1900, A Companion to American Technology, Dissection: Photographs of a Rite of Passage in American Medicine, as well as an excerpt in the book Medical Museums: Past, Present, and Future that talks extensively about the Dittrick Museum.

== Collections ==
The museum has an archive, artifacts, and image collections, including the "Reconcieving Birth" exhibit.

The Blaufox Hall of diagnostic instruments is known as one of the most comprehensive of its kind, displaying medical instruments over the years that have been used in hospitals and show the growing relationships between doctors and patients.

The museum has a wide display of reproductive and medical history: however, the majority of their collection is not displayed in the museum due to space. Instead, this information such as their collection on smallpox and dermatology as well as other exhibits can be found online through their website.

The museum's galleries include but are not limited to: Diagnostic Instruments, Doctor's Office 1870s, Doctor's Office 1930s, Early Medical Practice and Education, Hospital Medicine, 1865-1920, Laboratory Medicine 1865-1920, Microscopes, Millikin Room, Pharmacy 1880s, Stecher Room, Science, Technology, Medicine 1895-1950, Surgery, Obstetrics Instruments, Castele Gallery, Virtue, Vice, and Contraband: A history of Contraception in America and the HF Aitken collection of biomedical art.
