= Elisabeth Severance Prentiss =

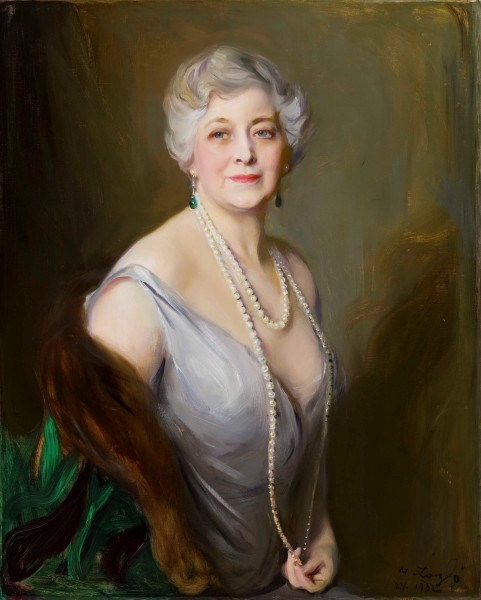
- Portrait of Mrs. F.F. Prentiss by Philip de László, 1932
- Born: 16 November 1865; Titusville, Pennsylvania, U.S.
- Died: 4 January 1944 (aged 78); Cleveland, Ohio, U.S.
- Education: Wellesley College
- Occupations: art collector, philanthropist
- Spouse(s): Dudley Peter Allen; Francis Fleury Prentiss
- Parent(s): Louis Severance; Fanny Benedict

Elisabeth Severance, Mrs. Francis Fleury Prentiss (1865–1944) was an American philanthropist and art collector.

Elisabeth Severance was born into a wealthy home as the daughter of the oil magnate Louis Severance and Fanny Benedict. She grew up in Cleveland and graduated at Wellesley College in 1887. She enjoyed the Boston galleries and returned to Cleveland to improve educational and arts-related institutions, joining her family in their philanthropic role as wealthy citizens of Cleveland.

In 1892, she married the surgeon Dudley Peter Allen. Together they were interested in travel and supporting the medical community and the arts. After her father died in 1913 they used her inheritance to collect art and Dudley was on the committee to create an art museum at his alma mater Oberlin College. He died himself in 1915, and after his death Elisabeth commissioned the building from Cass Gilbert. She built a large English manor styled home commissioned from another of his architect favorites, Charles F. Schweinfurth that she named after him, "Glenallen".

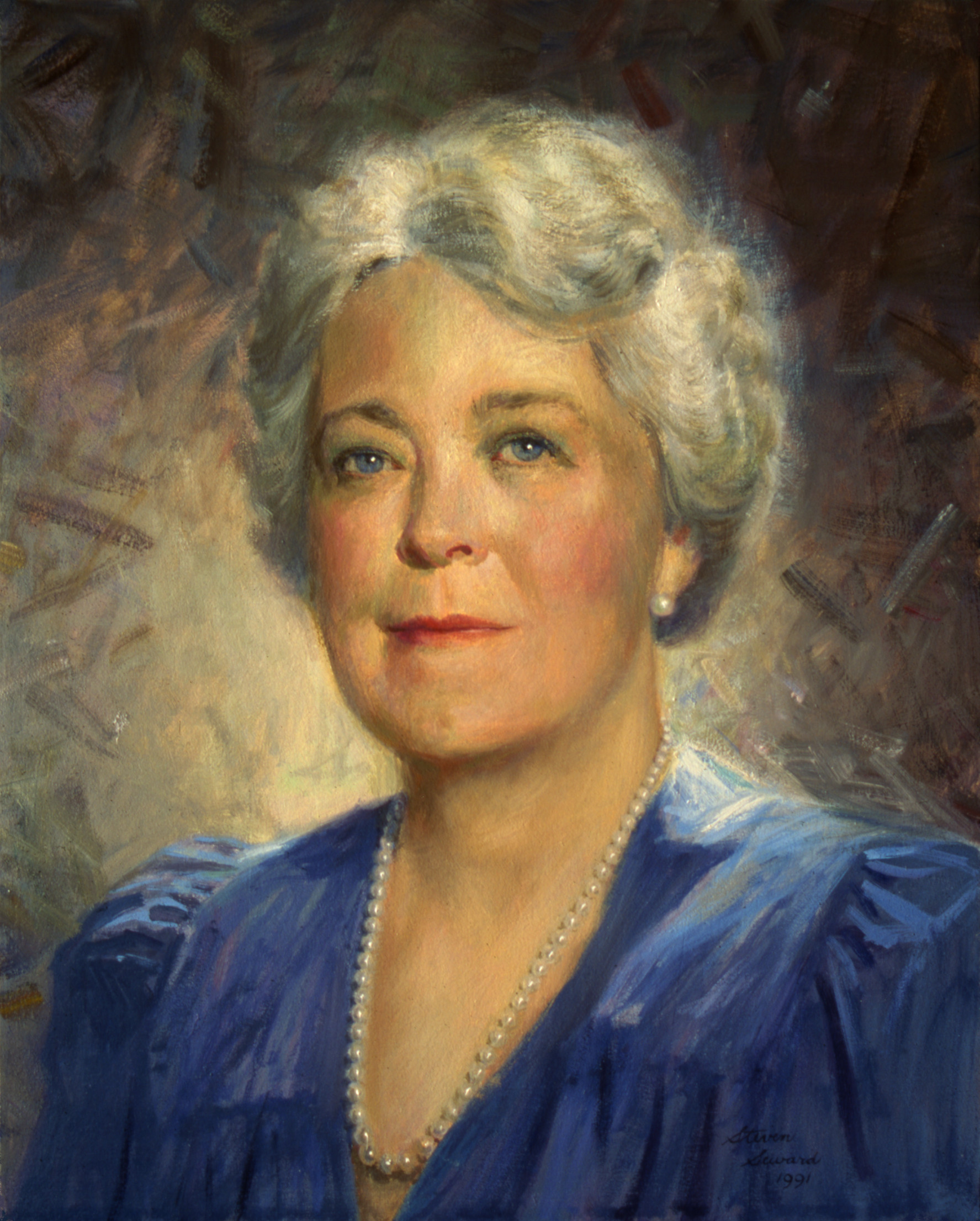
Elisabeth Severance Prentiss by Steven Christopher Seward and James E. Seward

She finished his work of expanding St. Luke's Hospital, which is how she met and married the president of that hospital, Dr. Francis Fleury Prentiss. The couple continued to be trustees of the hospital, and she took over his president's position when he died. She enjoyed gardening and a climbing rose was named after her in 1925. She was awarded with a public service medal by the Cleveland Chamber of Commerce in 1928.

== Art collection ==
Her first husband was an expert in Chinese porcelain.

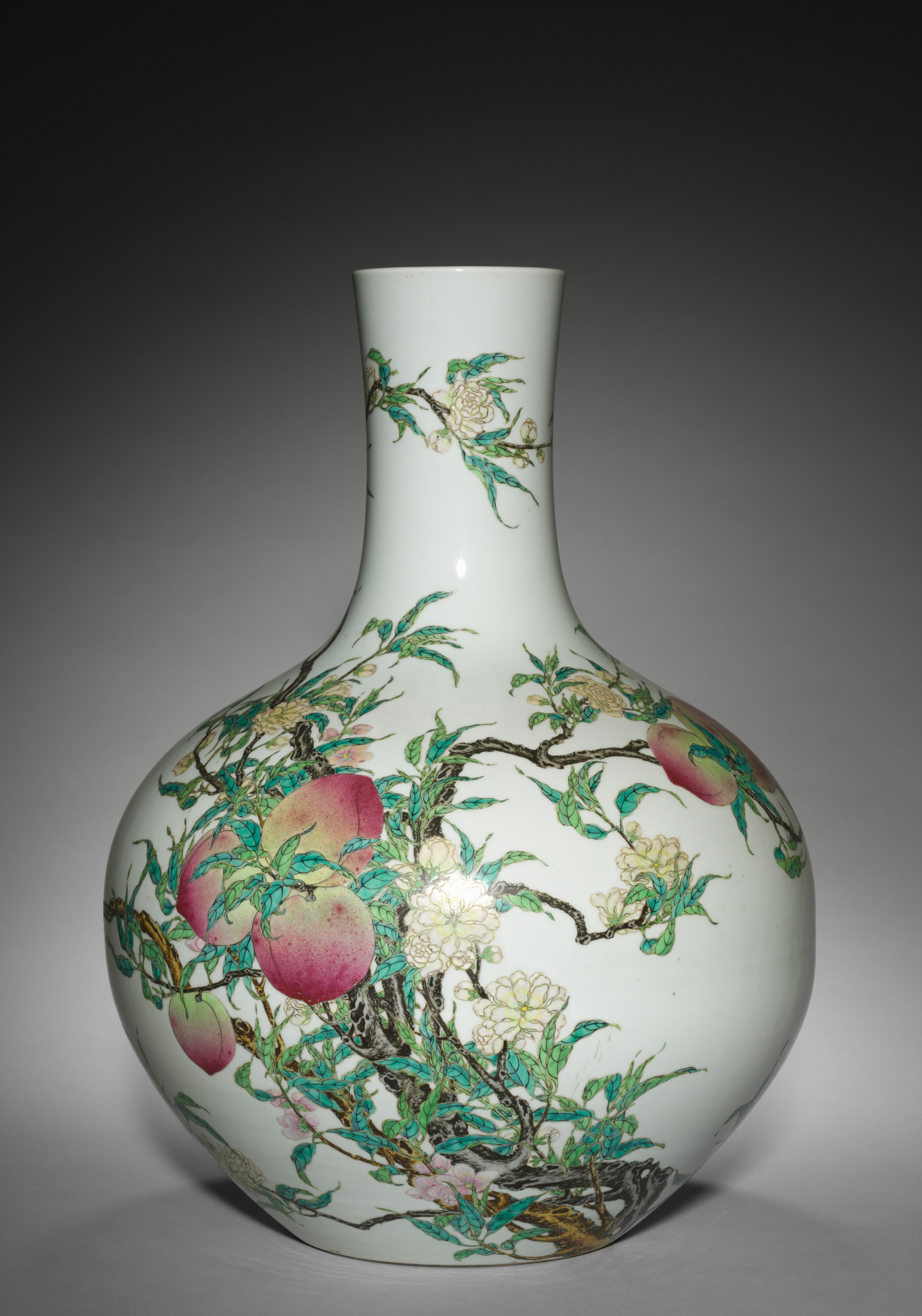
1736 Chinese vase

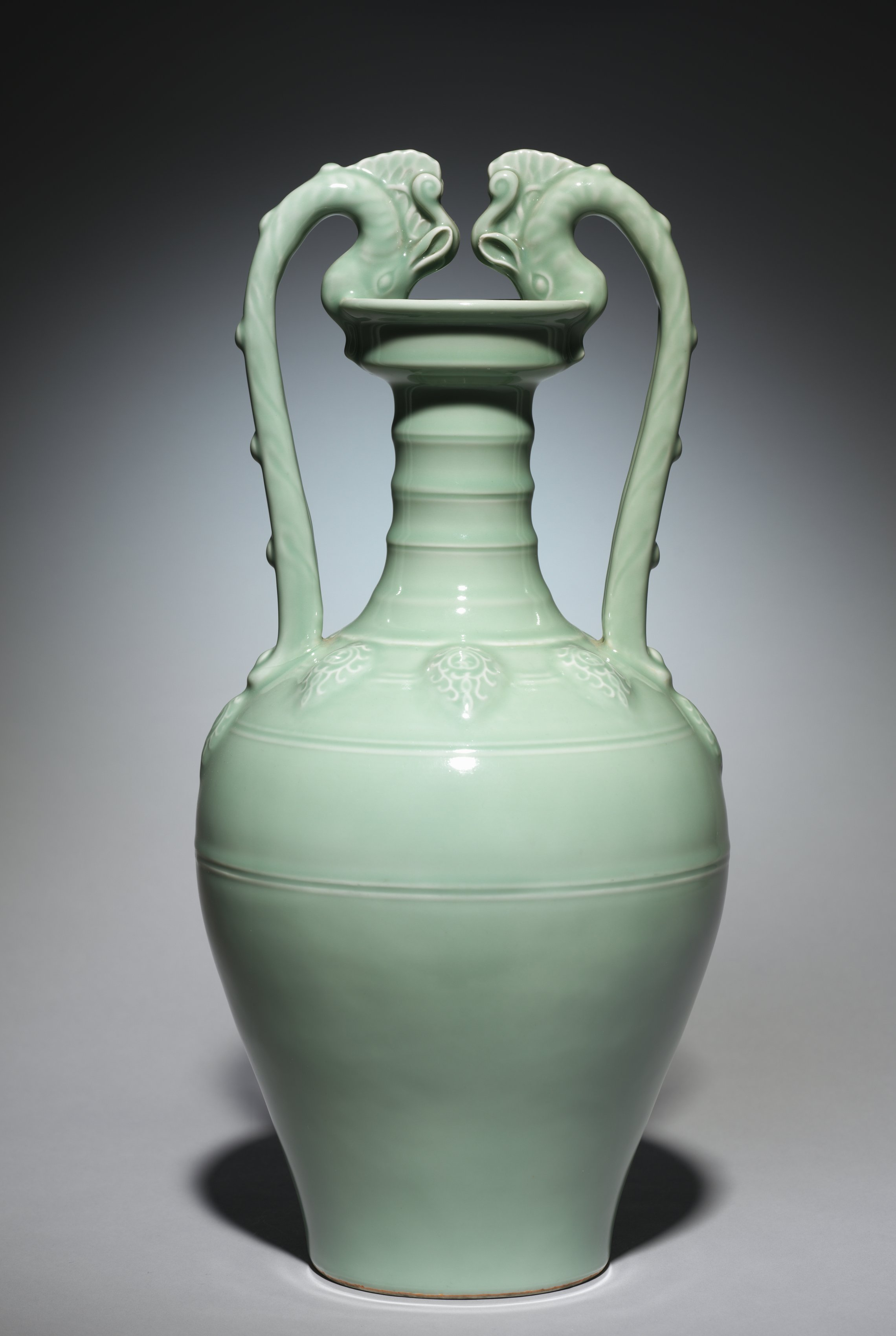
1723 Chinese vase

Her brother, John Long Severance, died in 1936, leaving her as sole heir of the Severance legacy. Her brother had been a collector of tapestries and paintings. She commissioned a catalogue of his bequest.

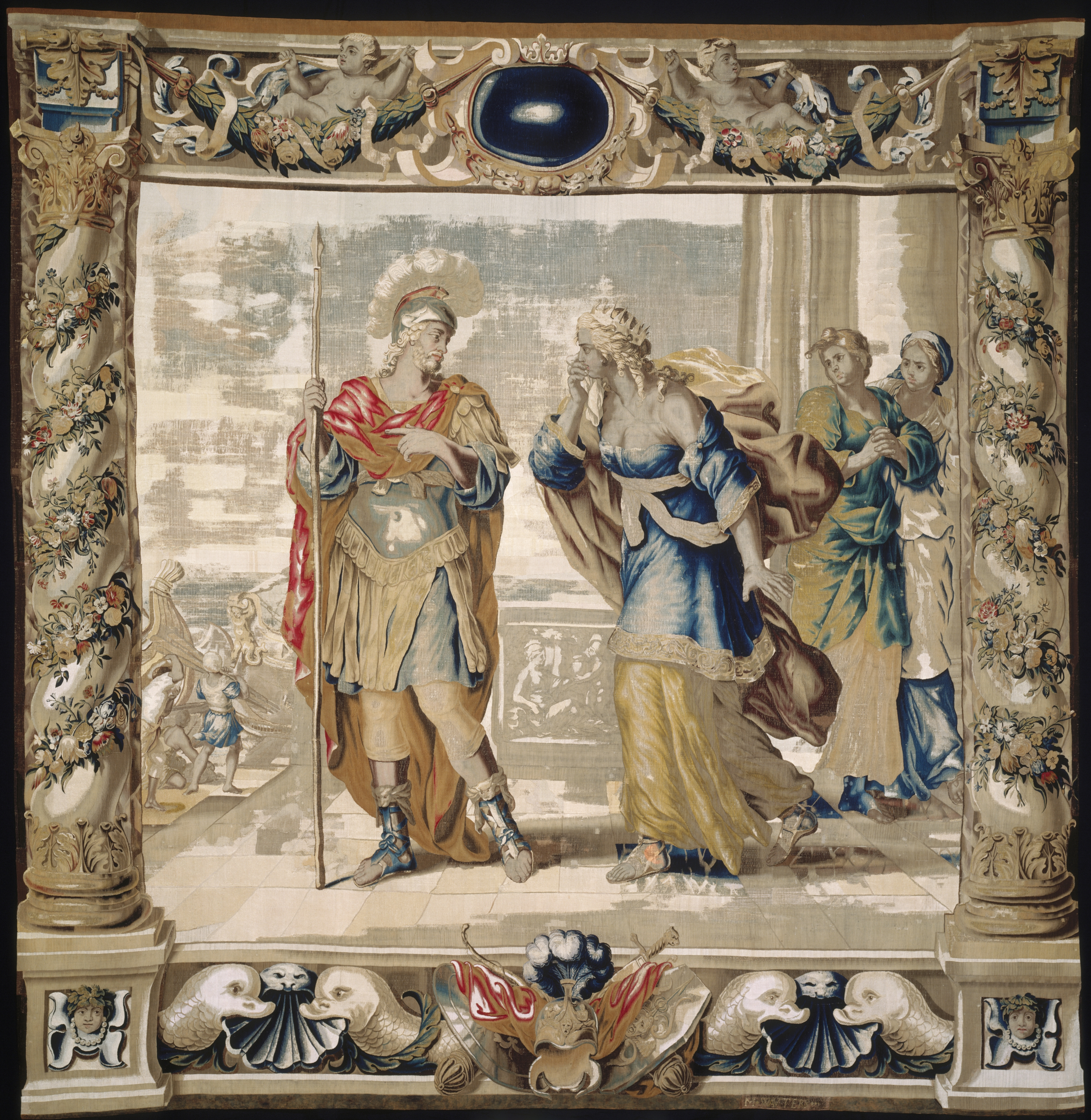
Aeneas says Farewell to Dido, Michael Wauters, 1679

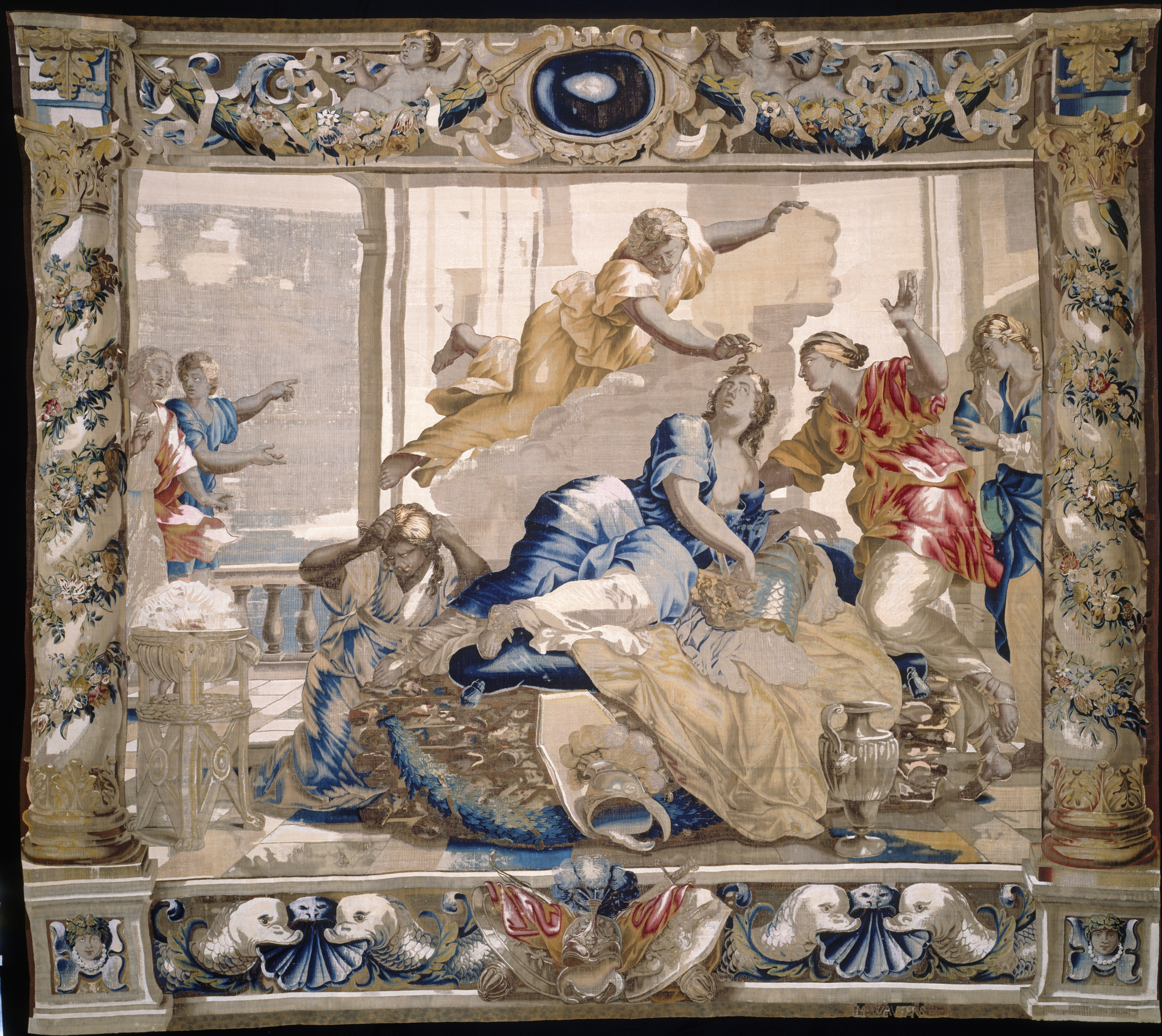
The Death of Dido, Michael Wauters, 1679

She owned several portraits of women:

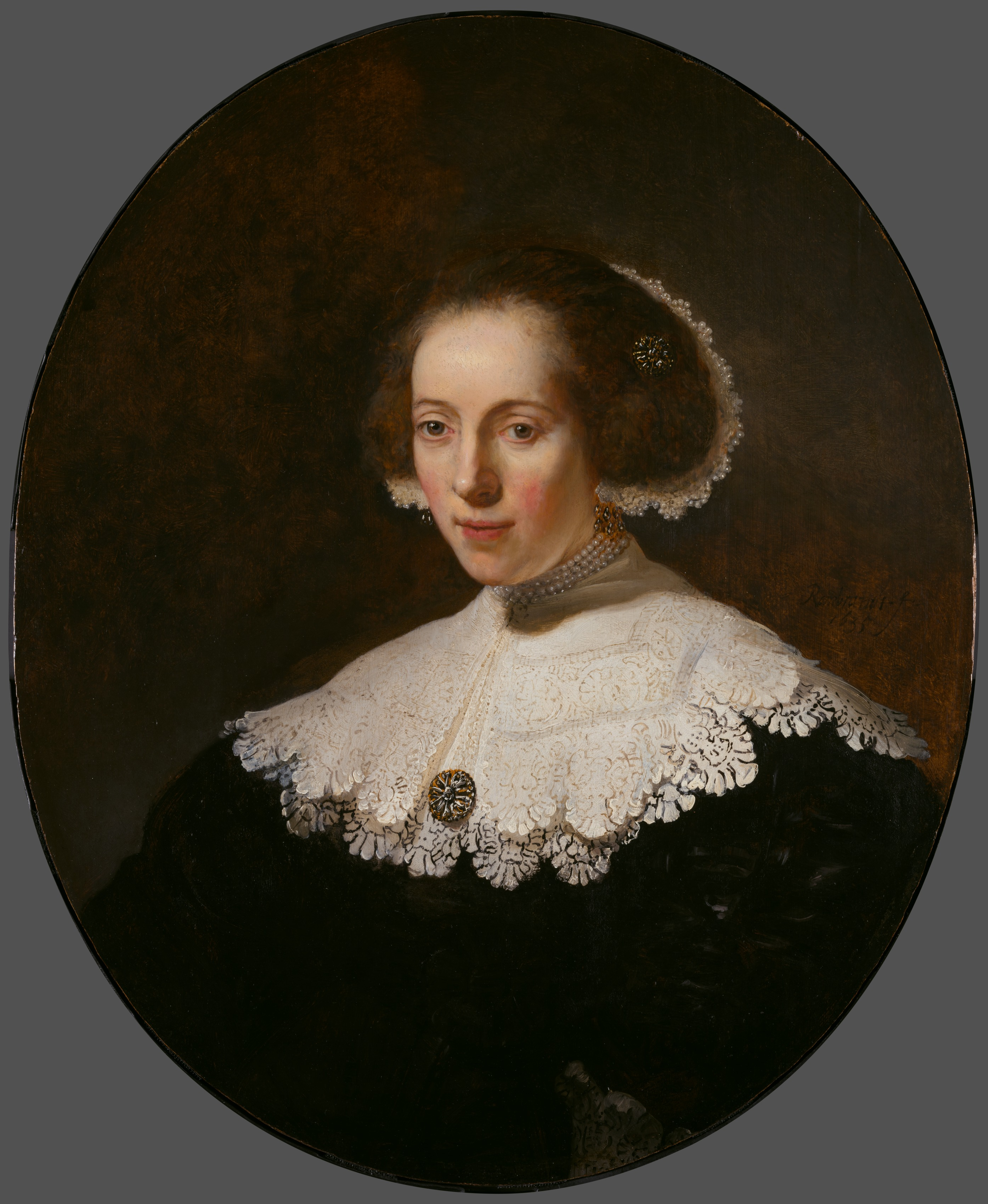
Portrait of a Woman, Rembrandt

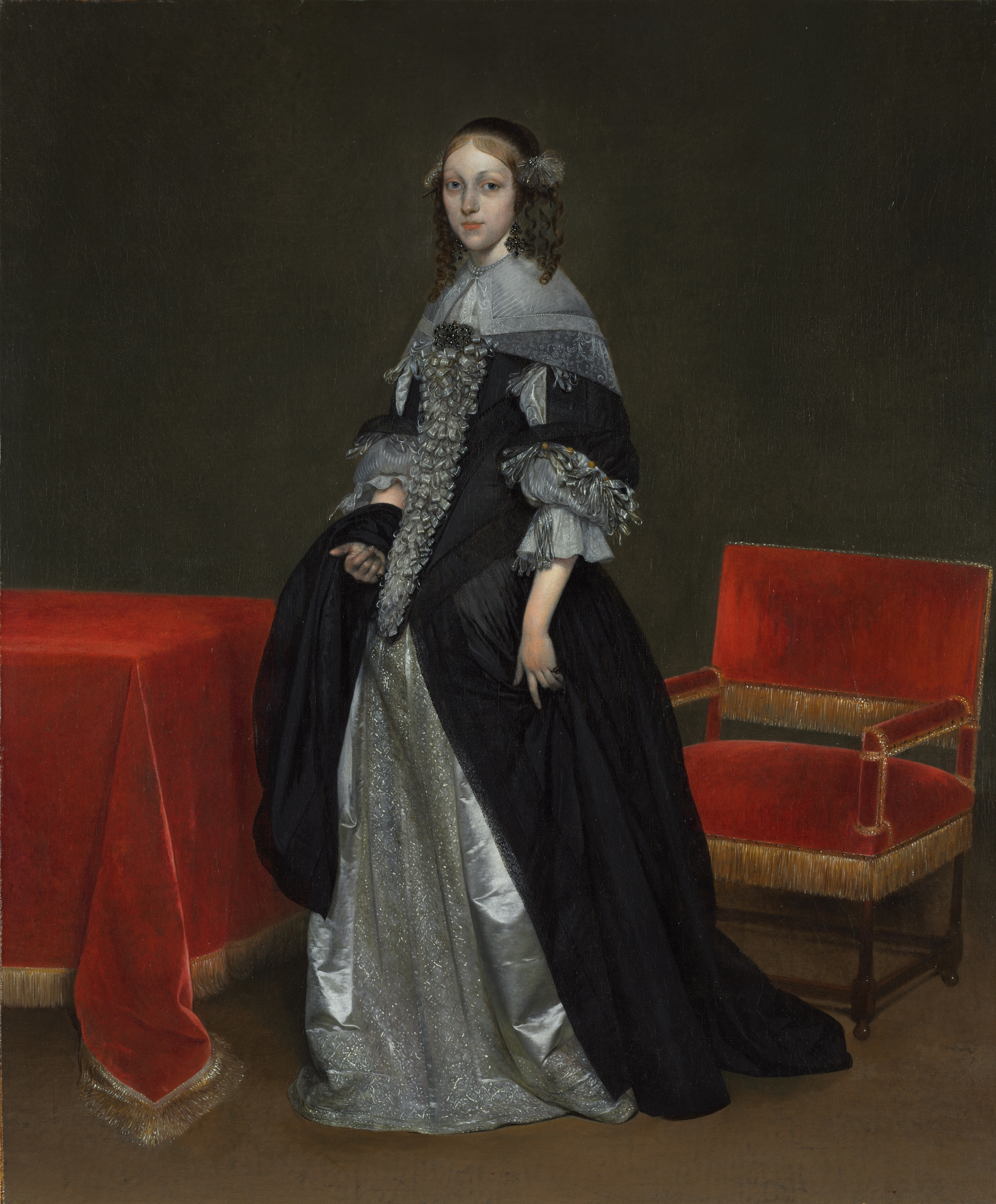
Portrait of a Woman, Gerard ter Borch

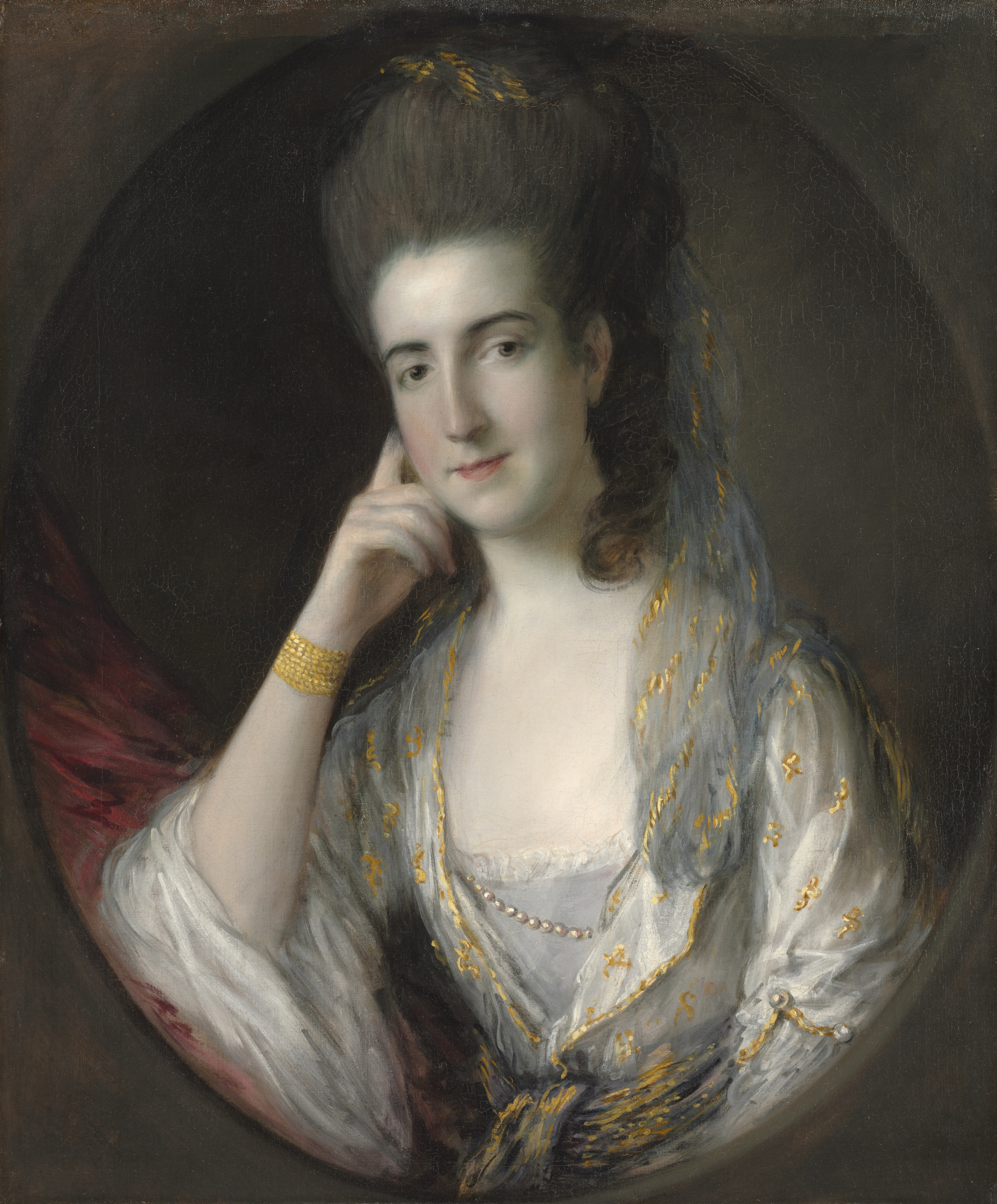
Portrait of a Mary Wise, Thomas Gainsborough

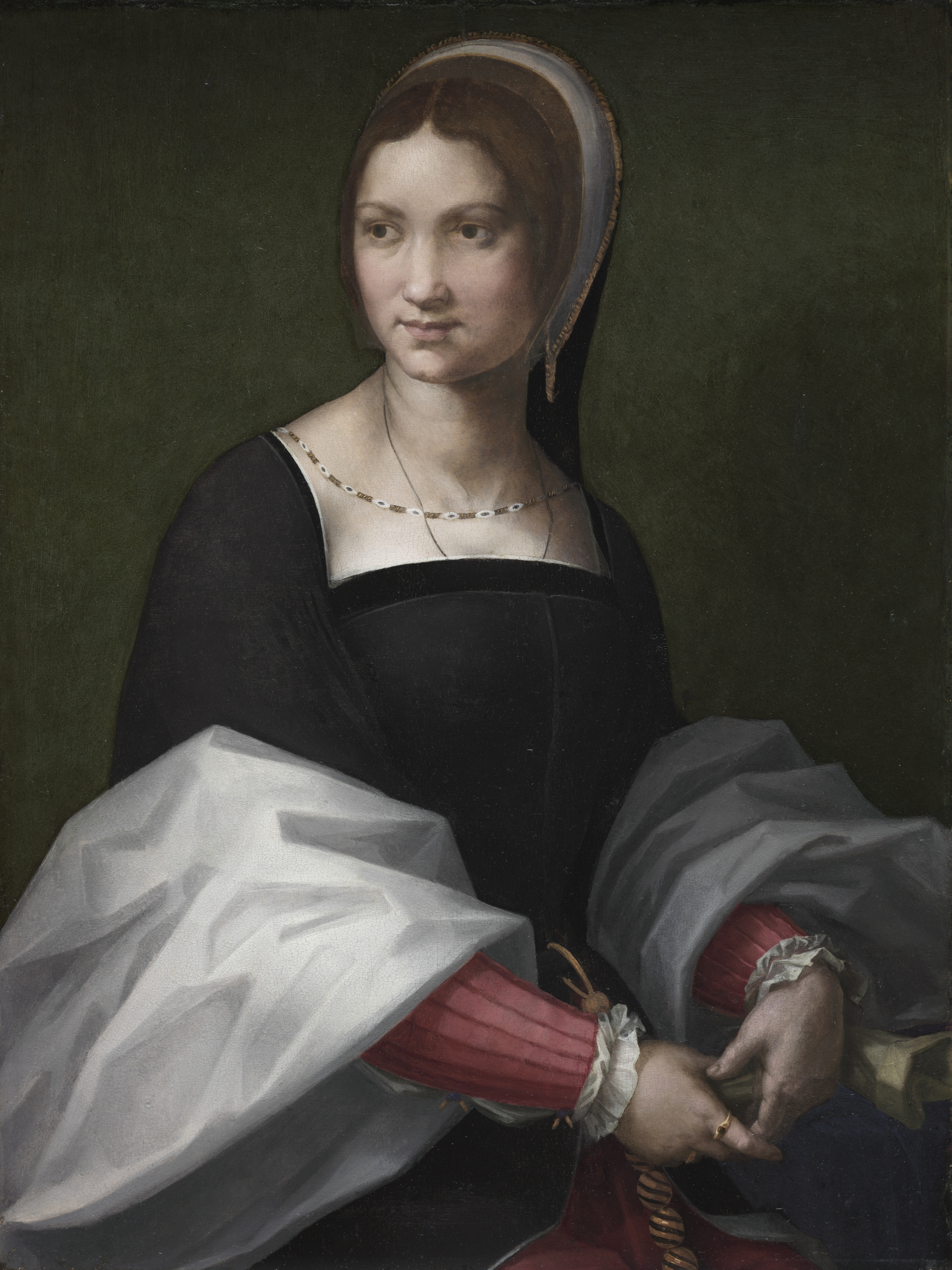
Portrait of a Woman, Andrea del Sarto

== Works ==
- Expansion of St. Luke's hospital
- Allen Memorial Medical Library
- Allen Memorial Art Museum
- Elisabeth Severance Prentiss Foundation
- Elisabeth Severance Prentiss Bequest, Cleveland Art Museum
- Mrs. F.F. Prentiss Fund, Allen Memorial Art Museum
