= Etowah marble =

Pink marble from Georgia

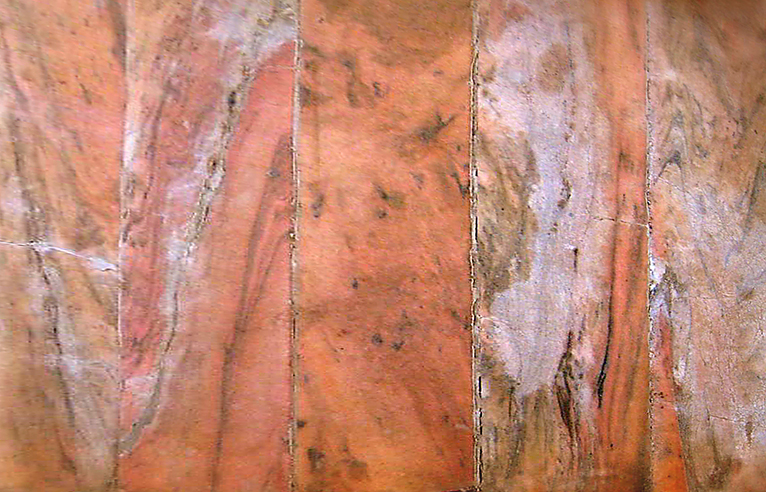
Etowah marble at the Joslyn Art Museum Omaha, NE

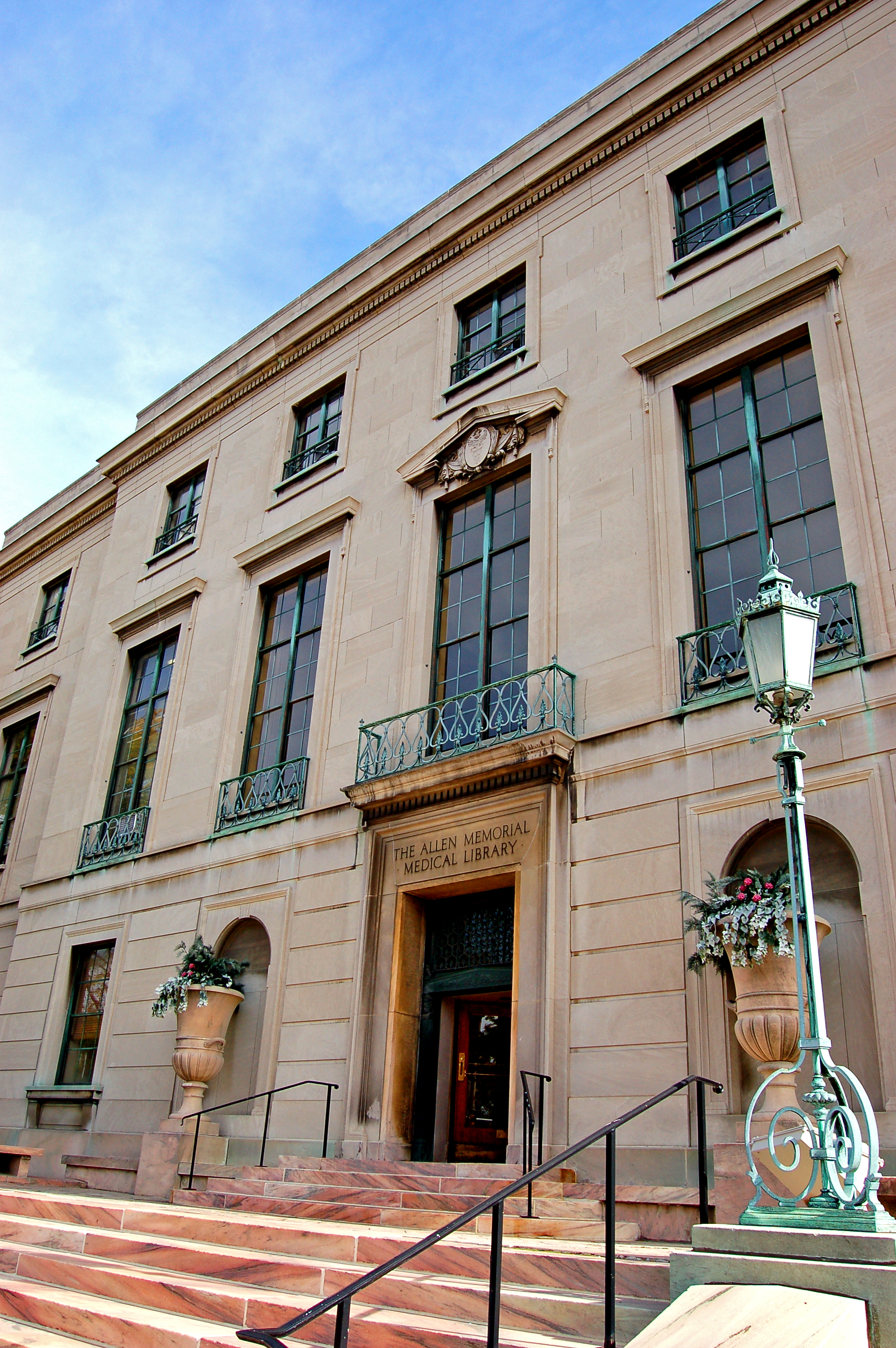
Allen Memorial Medical Library, made of Georgia pink marble, on the campus of Case Western Reserve University in Cleveland.

Etowah marble, also called Georgia pink marble, is a marble with a characteristic pink, salmon, or rose color that comes from quarries near Tate, Georgia.

== Notable buildings built with Etowah (also Ethowa) marble ==
- Federal Reserve Bank of Cleveland, 1923, architects Walker and Weeks, Cleveland, Ohio
- College Hall (former home of Charles Edward Ringling and wife Edith), 1925, New College of Florida, Sarasota, Florida
- Allen Memorial Medical Library, 1926, architects Walker and Weeks, Case Western Reserve University, Cleveland, Ohio
- Cook Hall (former home of Charles Edward Ringling's daughter, Hester Ringling Sanford), New College of Florida, Sarasota, Florida
- Carillon, Bok Tower Gardens, 1927, Lake Wales, Florida
- Joslyn Art Museum, John and Alan McDonald, architects, 1928, Omaha, Nebraska
- Tate House, 1928, architects Walker and Weeks, Tate, Georgia
- Pink Palace Museum, 1930, Memphis, Tennessee

== See also ==
- Georgia Marble Company
- Creole marble
- List of types of marble
