= Allen Memorial Art Museum =

Art museum in Oberlin, Ohio, US

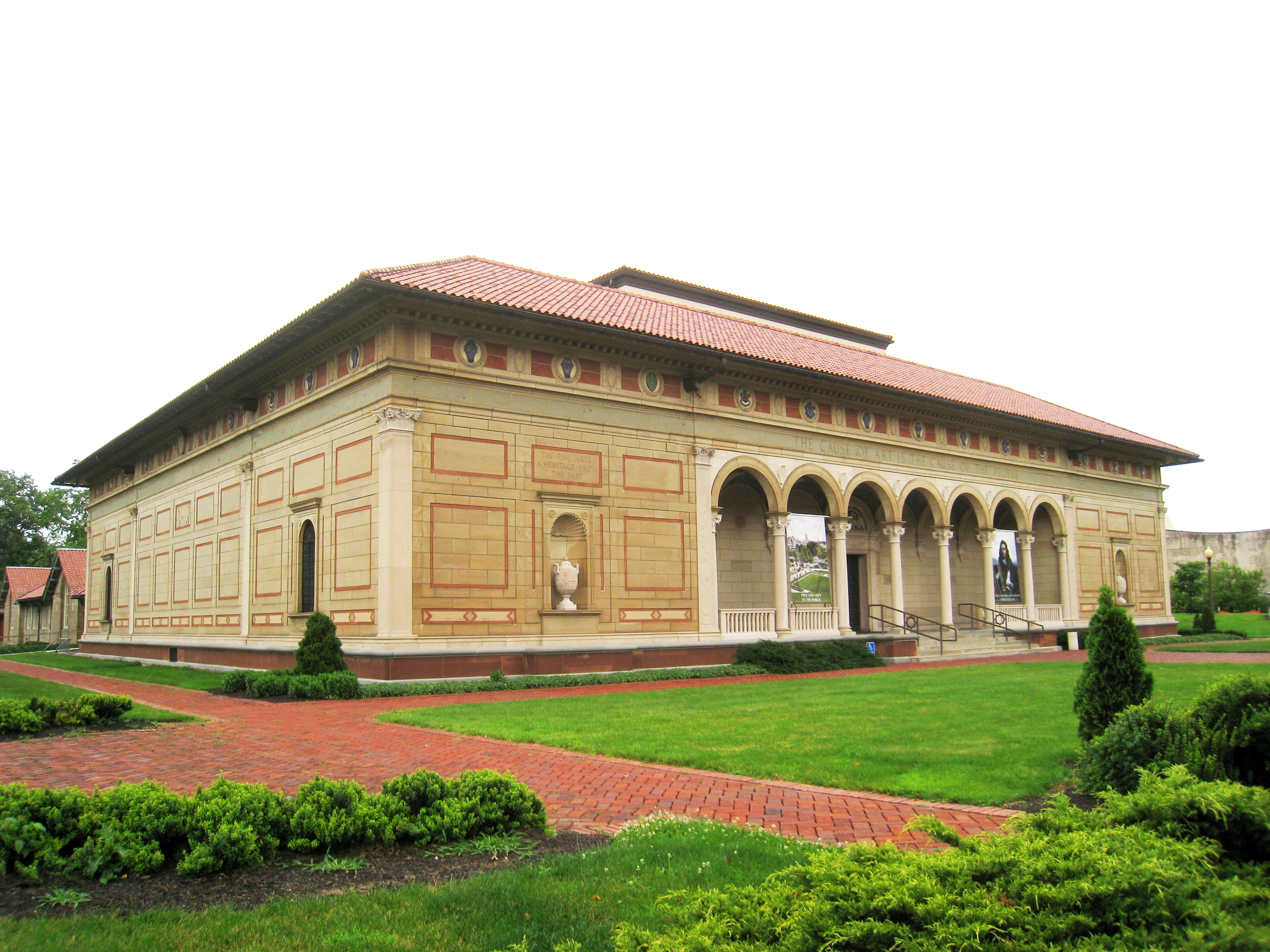
- Established: 1917
- Location: Oberlin College; 87 North Main Street; Oberlin, Ohio 44074, United States
- Coordinates: 41.293714°N 82.216782°W
- Type: Art museum
- Director: Jon Seydl
- Curators: Marlise Brown (European & American Art); Sam Adams (Modern & Contemporary Art); Kevin R. E. Greenwood (Asian Art); Hannah Kinney (Academic Programs)
- Website: amam.oberlin.edu

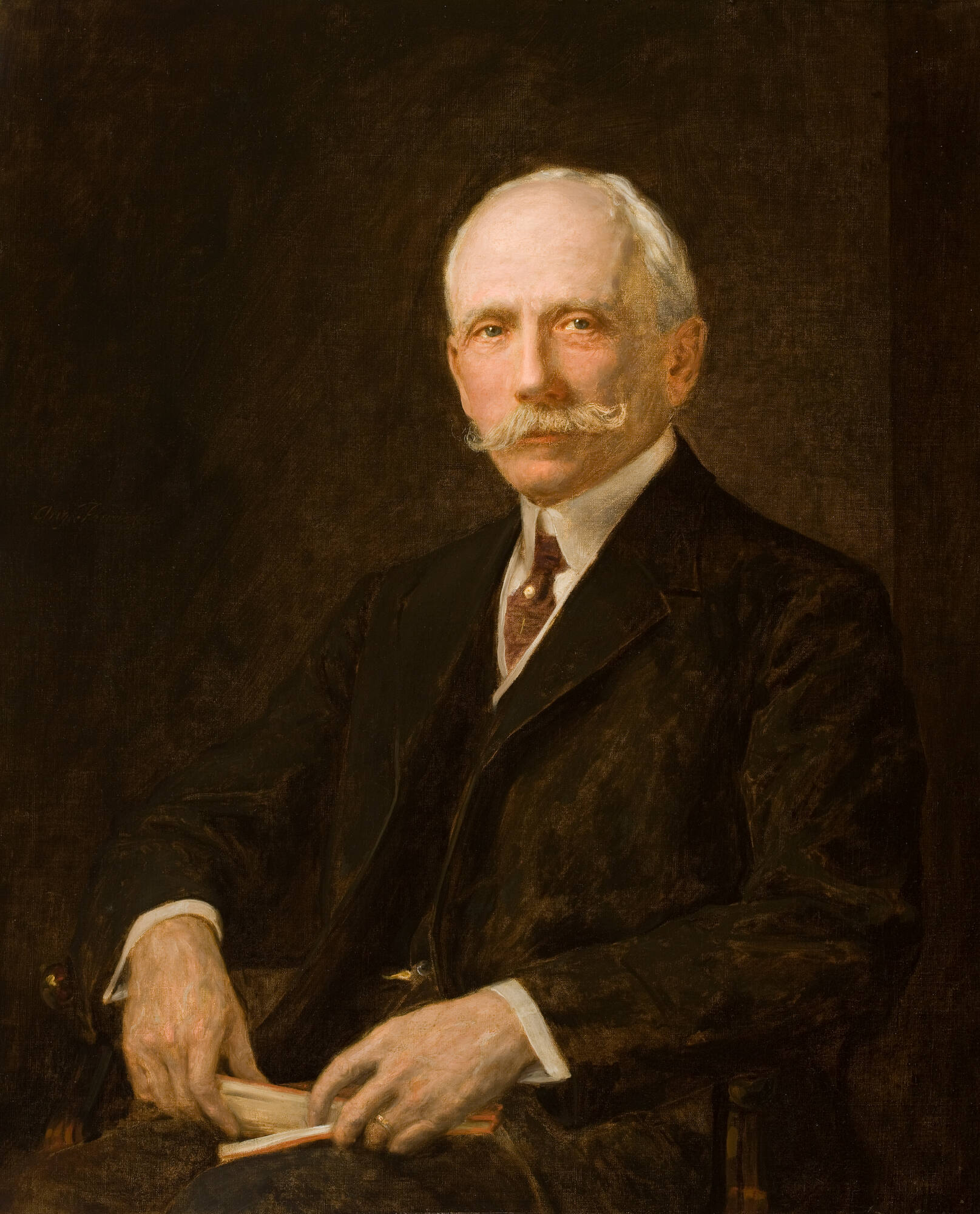
Founder Dudley Peter Allen by August Reinhold Franzén, 1915

The Allen Memorial Art Museum (AMAM) is an art museum located in Oberlin, Ohio, and run by Oberlin College. Founded in 1917, the collection contains over 15,000 works of art.

== Overview ==
The AMAM is primarily a teaching museum and is aimed at the students, faculty and staff of Oberlin College, in addition to the surrounding community. Notable strengths include seventeenth-century Dutch and Flemish art, nineteenth and early twentieth-century European and contemporary American art, as well as Asian, European and American works on paper. The collection is housed in an Italian Renaissance-style building designed by Cass Gilbert, incorporating ironwork by Samuel Yellin, and named after its founder, Dr. Dudley Peter Allen (B.A., 1875), a graduate and trustee of Oberlin College and the first husband of Elisabeth Severance Prentiss, whose bequest as Mrs. F. F. Prentiss included parts of her art collection started during her first marriage.

In 1977, the architecture firm Venturi and Rauch (led by husband and wife Robert Venturi and Denise Scott Brown) designed the Venturi Wing, an addition that represents one of the earliest examples of postmodern architecture in the United States; an example of their concept of a "decorated shed".

In 2011, the historic museum underwent a two-year retrofit, after which it was awarded with USGBC LEED Gold certification.

== Collections ==
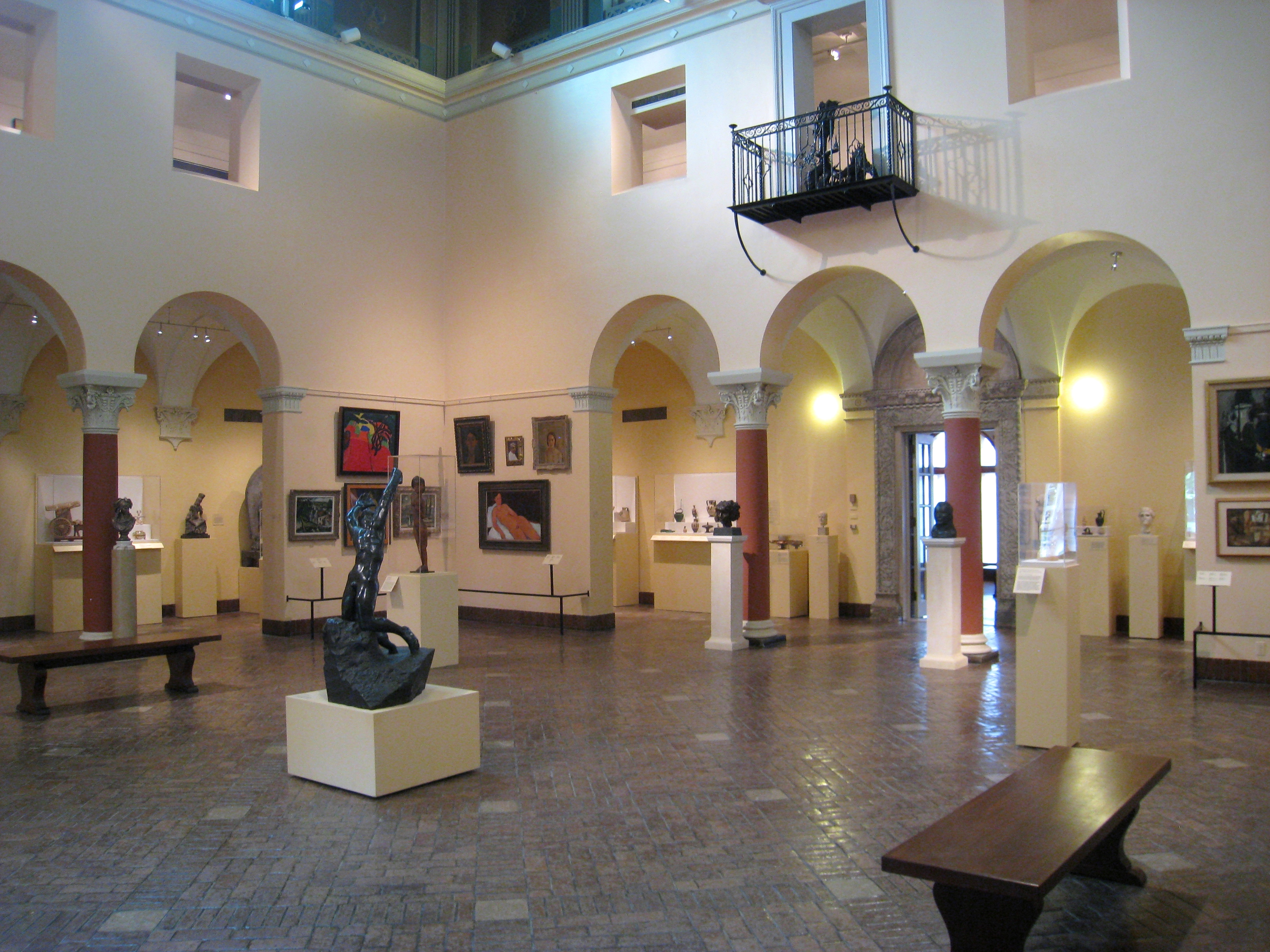
Allen's Central Rotunda, which contains the Egyptian, Greek and Roman art wings

The Allen Memorial Art Museum has a collection of more than 15,000 objects – including paintings, sculpture, decorative arts, prints, drawings and photographs – that provide a comprehensive overview of the history of art from a variety of cultures. The collection has a focus on European and American paintings and sculpture from the 15th century to today, and also has holdings of Asian paintings, scrolls, sculpture and decorative art, including a large group of Ukiyo-e prints.

Ancient Egyptian, Greek, Roman, African and Pre-Columbian art is represented. The museum also houses the Eva Hesse archives, which includes the artist’s notebooks, diaries, photographs and letters, and it oversees, along with the Art Department, Frank Lloyd Wright's Weltzheimer/Johnson House.

Notable donations were made by Jewish industrialist Eugene Leopold Garbaty, who fled Germany in the 1930.

In 2024, the museum restituted a watercolor by Egon Schiele, Schwarzes Mädchen, to the heirs of Fritz Grünbaum, who was murdered in the Holocaust. The artwork was one of several seized by the Manhattan D.A. in a criminal investigation by the trafficking unit.

=== Prentiss Fund ===
Purchases made through the Mrs. F.F. Prentiss Fund include a Henry Moore sculpture and other works:

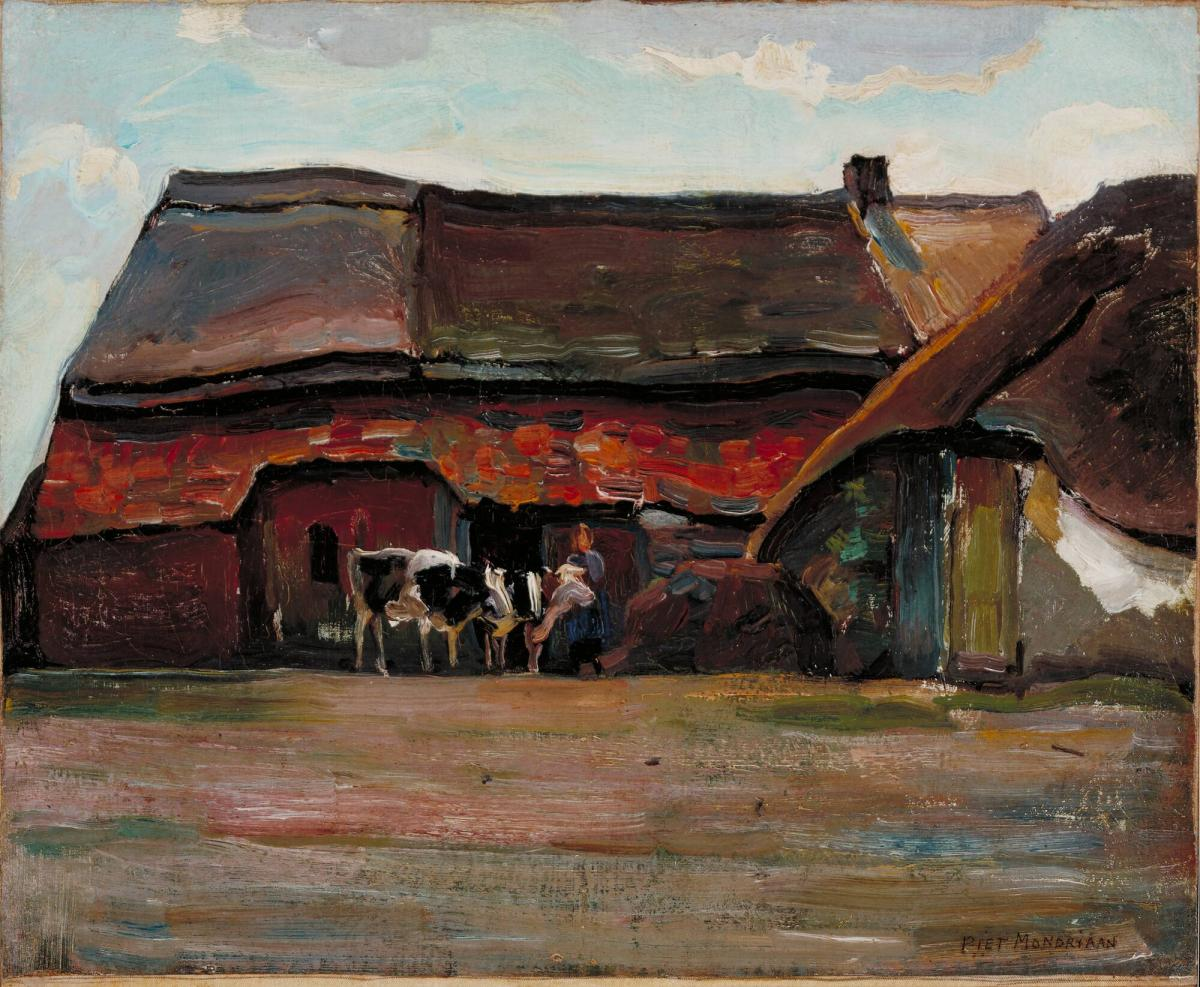
Brabant Farmyard by Piet Mondrian

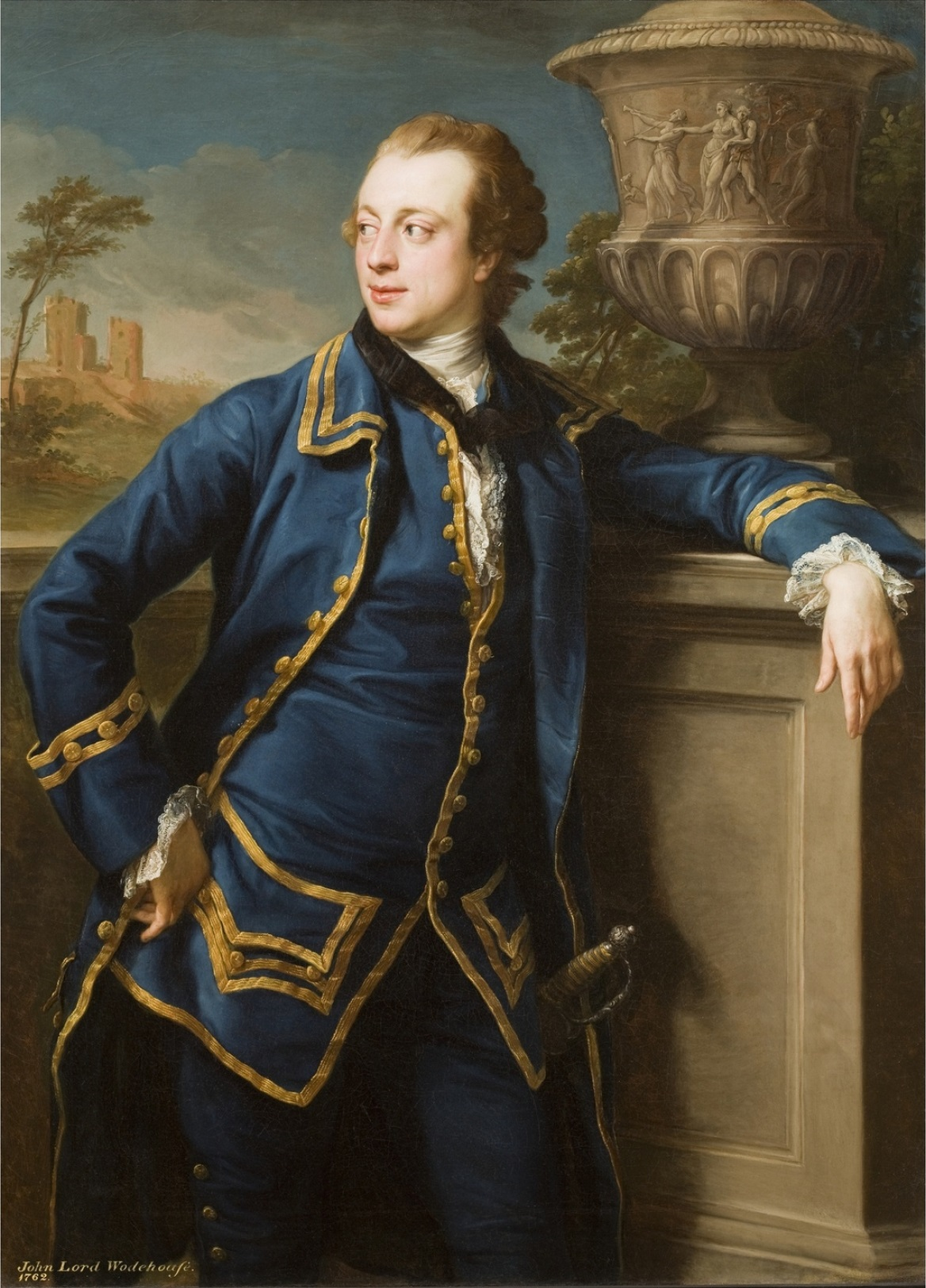
Portrait of John, 1st Lord Wodehouse, by Pompeo Batoni

== Art rental ==
At the beginning of every semester, students camp out in front of the north gate of the museum to get first pick of original etchings, lithographs and paintings by artists including Pierre-Auguste Renoir, Andy Warhol, Salvador Dalí, and Pablo Picasso. For five dollars per semester, students can hang these works on their dorm room walls.

The program was started in the 1940s by Ellen H. Johnson, a professor of art at Oberlin, in order to "develop the aesthetic sensibilities of students and encourage ordered thinking and discrimination in other areas of their lives."

== Gallery ==
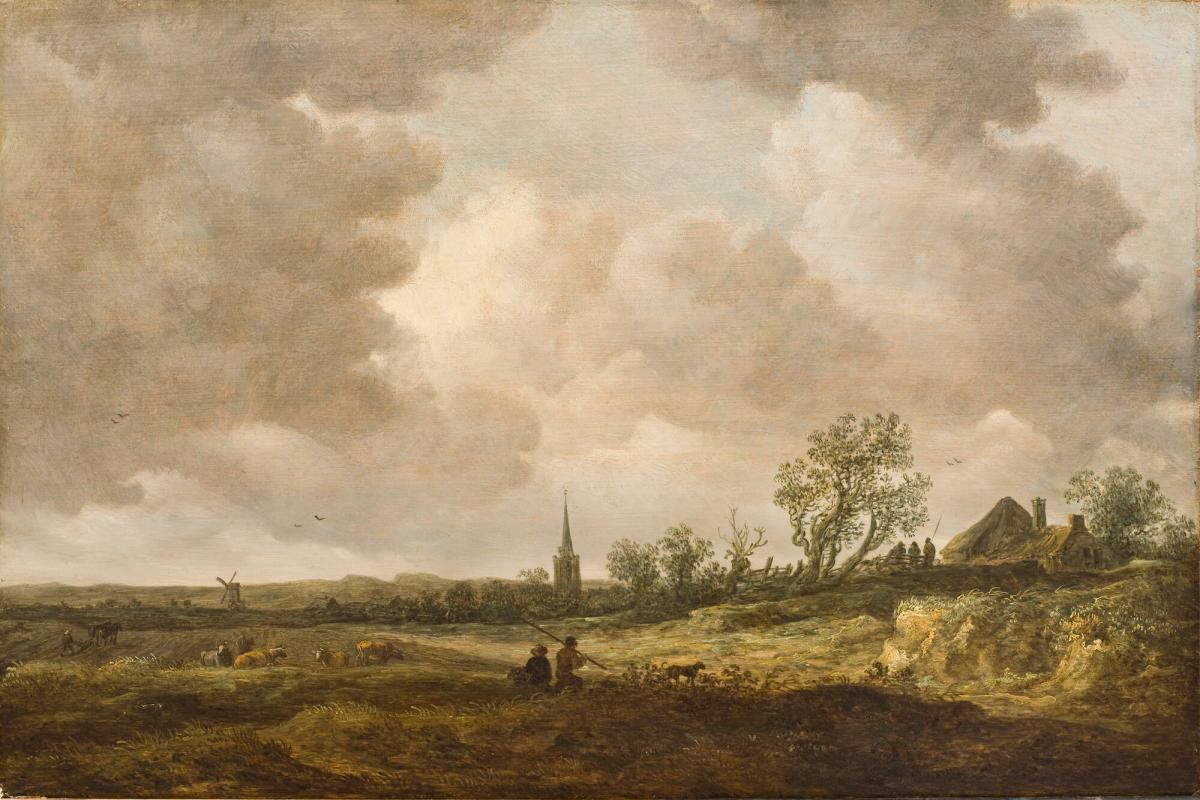
Landscape with Dunes by Jan van Goyen, 1647

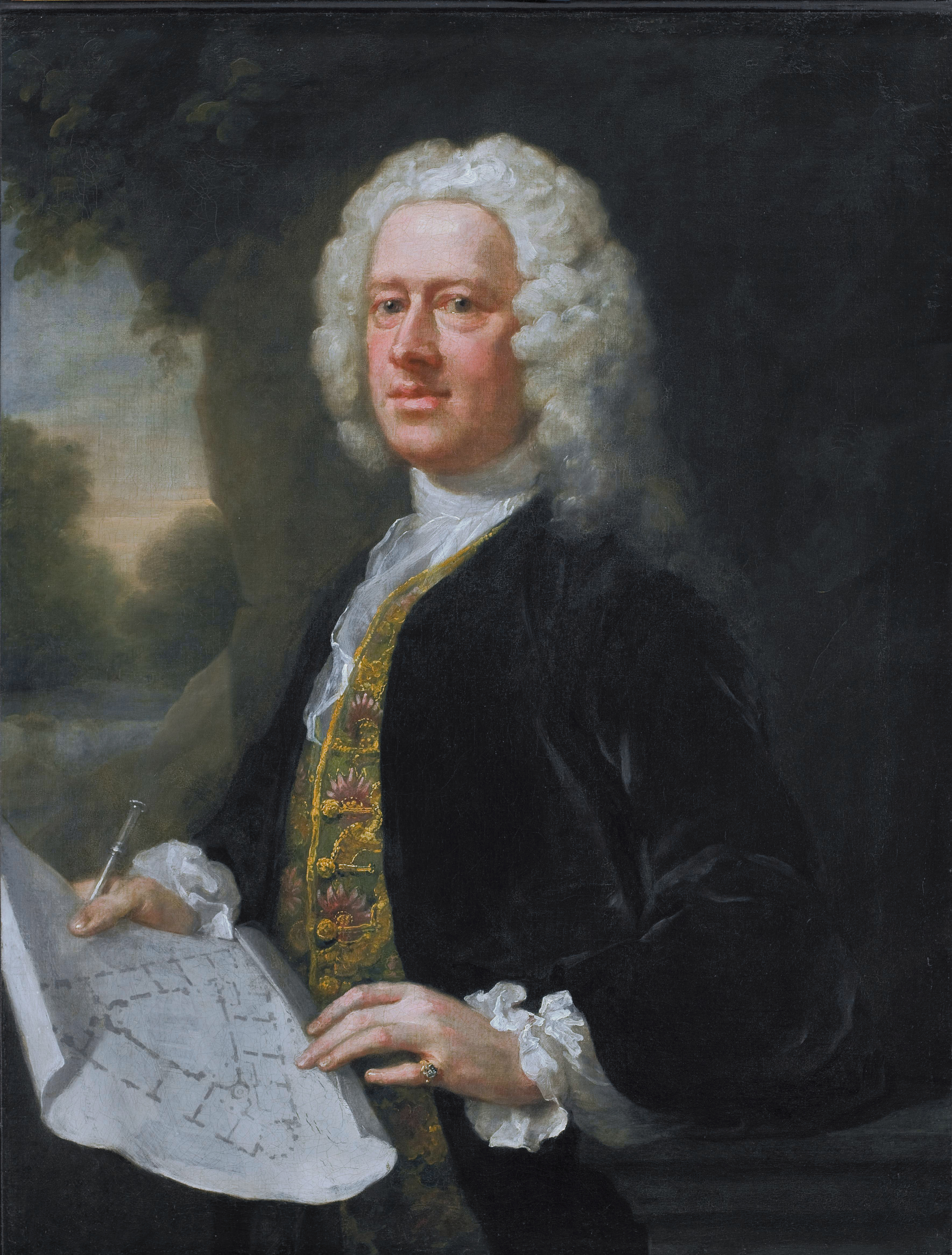
Portrait of Theodore Jacobsen by William Hogarth, 1742

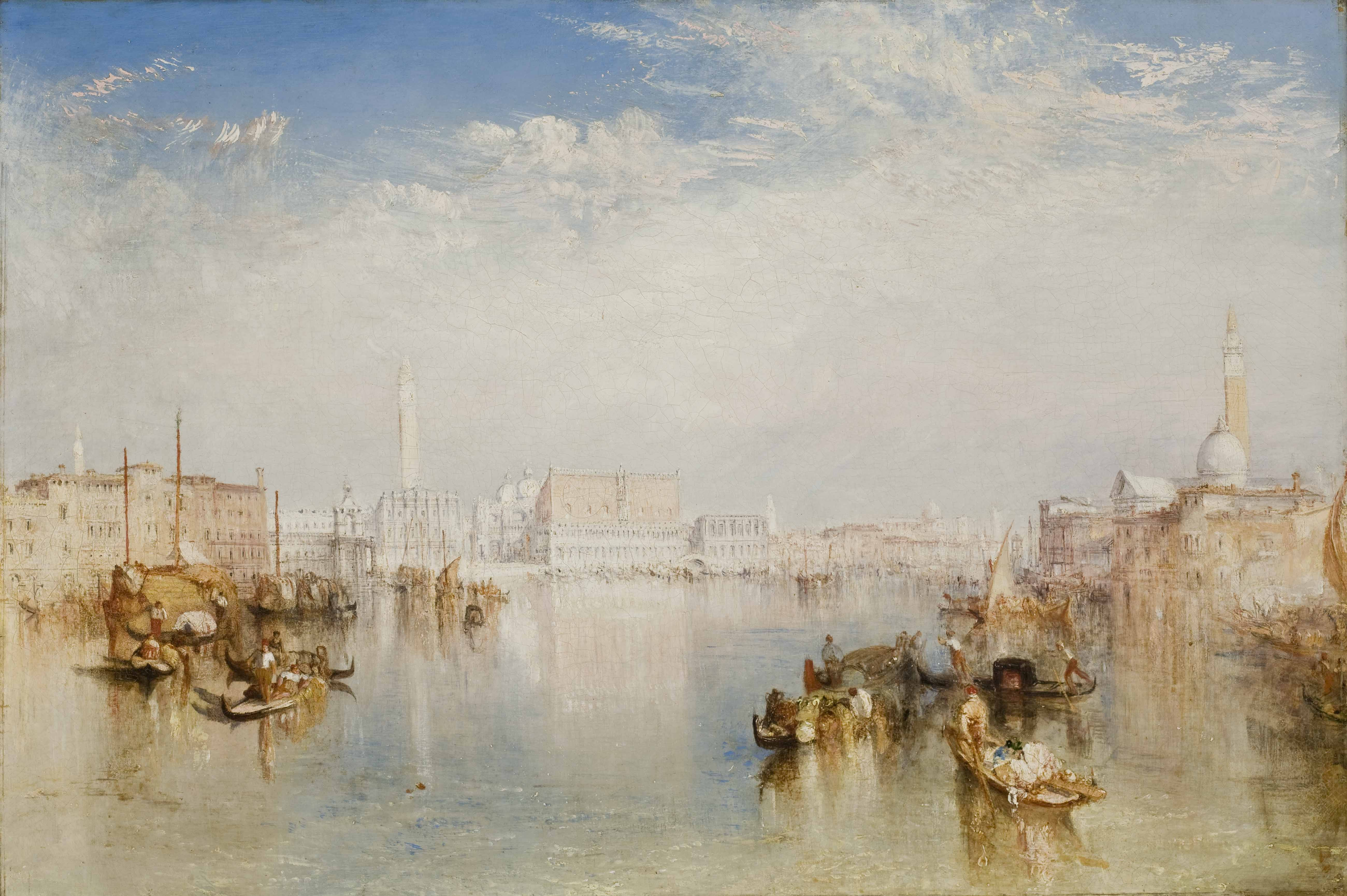
The Ducal Palace, Dogana and Part of San Giorgio by J.M.W. Turner, 1841

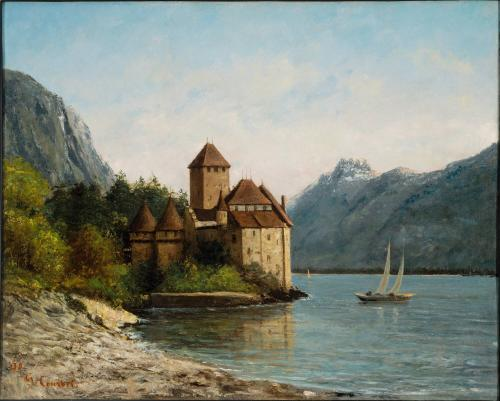
Castle of Chillon, Evening by Gustave Courbet, 1872
