= M. Donald Blaufox =

American professor and physicist

Morton Donald Blaufox
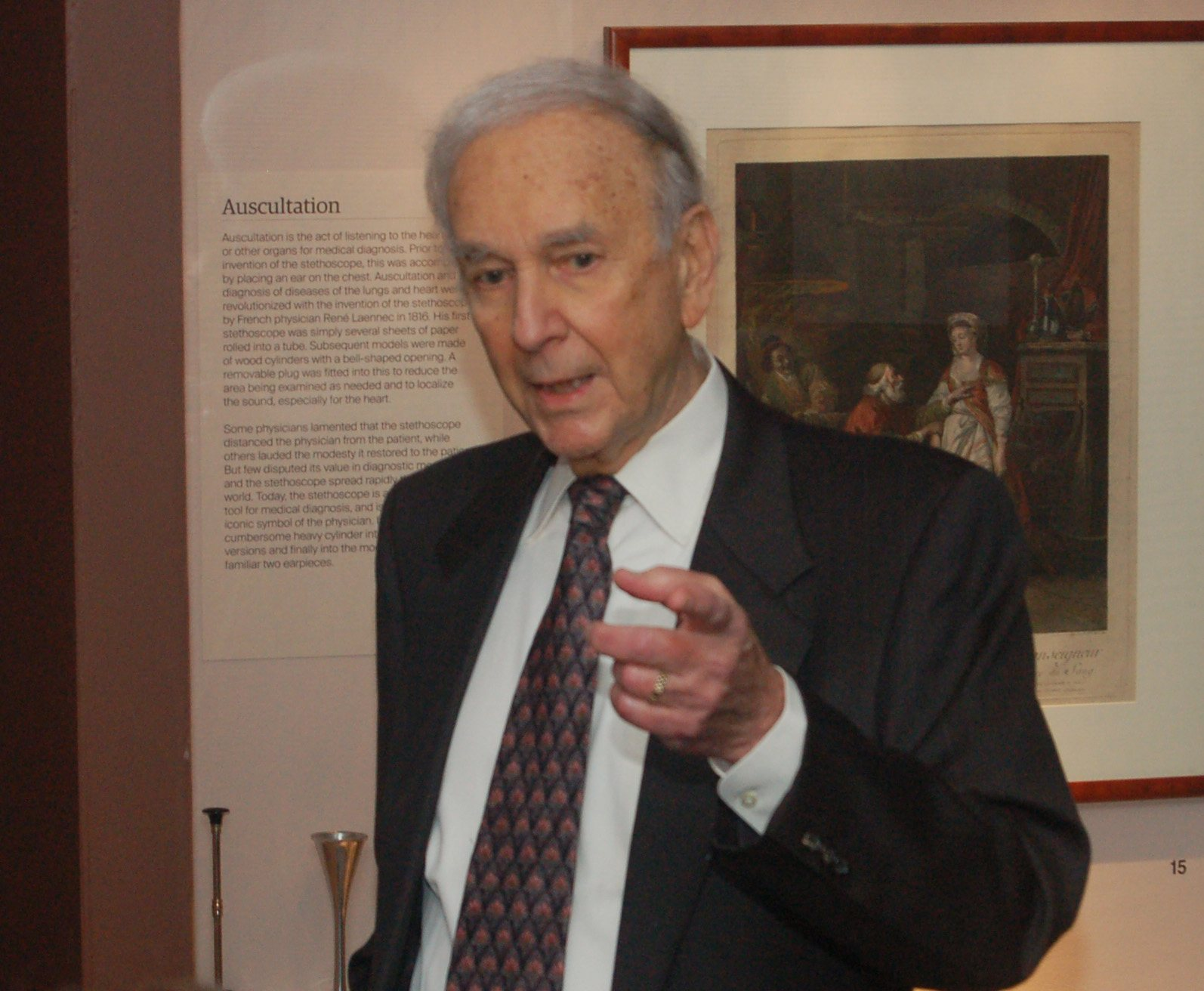
- Born: Coney Island Hospital New York
- Education: Bronx High School of Science; Harvard College; State University of New York; Mayo Foundation for Education and Research
- Known for: Development of nuclear medicine
- Spouse: Paulette Goldberg (1938-2023)
- Children: Laurie Blaufox Lee LLD, Ellen Blaufox MSW, Andrew Blaufox MD
- Scientific career
- Fields: Nuclear medicine

M. Donald Blaufox (born July 19, 1934) is an American physician and academic known for his contributions to nuclear medicine, hypertension research, renal disease, and the history of medicine. He is the founding Chairman of the Department of Nuclear Medicine at the Albert Einstein College of Medicine and Montefiore Medical Center. Blaufox served as Chairman of the American Board of Nuclear Medicine and president of the New York Chapter of the Society of Nuclear Medicine. He was one of the principal investigators in the Hypertension Detection and Follow-up program that received a Lasker award for demonstrating the benefit of treatment of hypertension. He is founding co-editor of the Seminars in Nuclear Medicine that played a major role in Nuclear Medicine and served in that capacity for 50 years. He is currently Professor and University Chairman Emeritus of Nuclear Medicine at the Albert Einsteins College of Medicine and Chairman Emeritus of the Department of Nuclear Medicine at Montefiore Medical Center.

== Early life and education ==
Blaufox was born in New York, NY. He attended the Bronx High School of Science, graduating in 1952. He then pursued undergraduate studies at Harvard College from 1952 to 1955, leaving after three years to attend medical school. Blaufox earned his medical degree from the State University of New York, Downstate Medical Center in 1959, followed by a Ph.D. in medicine from the University of Minnesota in 1964.

== Postgraduate training ==
Blaufox completed his internship at the Jewish Hospital in Brooklyn, New York, and pursued internal medicine training at the Mayo Foundation for Medical Education and Research in Rochester, Minnesota, from 1960 to 1964. He furthered his research in internal medicine and nephrology as an Advanced Research Fellow with the American Heart Association at Harvard Medical School and Peter Bent Brigham Hospital from 1964 to 1966, working with John Merrill and Cliff Barger.

== Career ==
In 1966, Blaufox joined the Albert Einstein College of Medicine as an assistant professor of radiology and medicine, later rising to the rank of Professor. He was appointed the Founding Chairman of the Department of Nuclear Medicine in 1982, a position he held until 2011. Blaufox became Professor and University Chairman Emeritus in 2012. He founded the PET Center at Montefiore Medical Center and the microPET laboratory at the Albert Einstein College of Medicine.

Blaufox played an important role in the development of nuclear medicine and the International Scientific Committee for Radionuclides in Nephrourology and served as Chairman of the American Board of Nuclear Medicine in 1990.

In the late 1960s and early 1970s, Blaufox conducted studies on reflux in children with radioisotopes, funded by the Public Health Service, and researched renal blood flow and renin secretion in hypertension, supported by the National Heart and Lung Institute from 1967 to 1970. Blaufox also participated in the Surveillance of Mortality and Blood Pressure Control Status as part of the Hypertension Detection and Follow-Up Program (1979–1981), and earlier, he was principal investigator of the New York Center for the Hypertension Detection and Follow-Up Program from 1972 to 1979, both funded by the National Heart, Lung, and Blood Institute. His research on improved radiopharmaceuticals for renal studies was funded by the National Institutes of Health from 1974 to 1977.

Between 1980 and 1984, he led the New York center for Dietary Intervention Study for Hypertension, again supported by the NHLBI. As a co-investigator, Blaufox contributed to the Specialized Center of Research in Hypertension (SCOR-NIH) from 1991 to 1993. Additionally, he investigated the effects of dietary modifications on blood pressure control from 1984 to 1991 and was principal investigator of the New York center for the Systolic Hypertension in the Elderly Program, both funded by the NHLBI.

He also directed research on Nuclear Medicine Procedures in Hypertension, funded NHLBI, between 1988 and 1992.

== Publications and editorial roles ==
Blaufox has authored or edited 25 books and over 290 peer-reviewed articles and book chapters, primarily in the fields of nuclear medicine, hypertension, and medical history. His authored works include Blood Pressure Measurement: An Illustrated History and An Ear to the Chest: The Evolution of the Stethoscope. His autobiography is published under the title Four Kinds of People, an Autobiography. He has also served as Founding Co-Editor of Seminars in Nuclear Medicine and as the editor of the renal section of the Yearbook of Nuclear Medicine, and has been a member of the editorial boards of several other academic journals as well as serving as Chairman of the Publications committee of the Society of Nuclear Medicine.

== Philanthropy ==
The Blaufox Hall of Diagnostic Instruments at the Dittrick Museum in Cleveland was created with his support. (Dean's Society, Case Western Reserve University, 2009) and instruments he donated from his private collection.

The section on radioactivity of the Museum of Nuclear Science and History in Albuquerque was created from objects that he collected. He created the short term exhibition on The Dawn of Modern Medicine at the Bruce Museum of Arts and Science and has donated to the American Museum of Natural History, Jessup Society, American Museum of Natural History, 2006–Present), the Metropolitan Museum of Art, The Wildlife Conservation Society, Harvard Medical School (Dean's Council, Harvard Medical School, 2014–Present), (1636 Society, Harvard College, 2014–Present), and the Bruce Museum.

== Awards and honors ==
- Bicknell Lecturer, American Urologic Association, 2016
- R. Edward Coleman, MD Lecture: Past, Present and Future of Renal Scintigraphy, Southeastern Chapter - Society of Nuclear Medicine, 2012
- Fellow, American College of Nuclear Medicine, 2010
- M. Donald Blaufox Hall of Diagnostic Instruments, 2009
- M. Donald Blaufox Laboratory for Molecular Imaging, 2006
- Fellow, American Society of Nephrology, 2005
- Lifetime Member, The National Atomic Museum, 2004
- Advisory Board, Mobile Medical Museum, 2002
- Member, International Advisory Committee of the 34th Annual Conference of the Society of Nuclear Medicine, India, 2002
- Lifetime Achievement Award, International Society of Radionuclides in Nephro-Urology, 2001
- Atis K. Freimanis Visiting professor, Michigan State University, 2001
- Highly Commended in Basis of Medicine, Medical Book Competition, British Medical Association, for Blood Pressure Measurement: An Illustrated History, 1999
- Keynote Address, British Nuclear Medicine Society, Brighton, UK, 1998
- Honorary Professor of Medicine, Shanxi Medical University, Taiyuan, People's Republic of China, 1997
- Fellow, Royal Society of Medicine, 1995
- Fellow, Society of Uroradiology, 1995
- Ninth Annual Daniel R. Biello Memorial Lecture, Mallinckrodt Institute of Radiology, 1995
- Second Annual Corporate Lecture, Medical History Society of New Jersey, 1994
- Fellow, Council on Cardiovascular Radiology, American Heart Association, 1992
- George Taplin Memorial Lecturer, Western Regional Meeting of the Society of Nuclear Medicine, 1991
- Corresponding Member, Swiss Society of Nuclear Medicine, 1990
- Sarabhai Memorial Oration Award, Society of Nuclear Medicine, Lucknow, India, 1989
- First Annual Berson-Yalow Award, Greater New York Chapter of the Society of Nuclear Medicine, 1989
- Fellow, New York Academy of Medicine, 1984
- Fellow, American College of Nuclear Physicians, 1982
- Albert Lasker Special Public Health Service Award, awarded to the Hypertension Detection and Follow-Up Program ( Principal Investigator, New York Center), 1980
- Fellow, Council for High Blood Pressure Research, American Heart Association, 1980
- Fellow, American College of Physicians, 1977
- Sigma Xi, 1963
- Mayo Foundation for Medical Education and Research, Edward Noble Foundation Award, 1963
- Joseph Collins Foundation Scholarship, Medical School, 1955–1959
- Seymour Schatzberg Memorial Scholarship, Medical School, 1955–1959
- Harvard College Scholarship, 1952-1955

== Publications ==
- Blaufox, M. D.; Sanderson, D. R.; Tauxe, W. N.; Wakim, K. G.; Orvis, A. L.; Owen, C. A. (April 1963). "Plasmatic diatrizoate-I-131 disappearance and glomerular filtration in the dog". The American Journal of Physiology. 204 (4): 536–540. doi:10.1152/ajplegacy.1963.204.4.536. ISSN 0002-9513. PMID 13971566.
- Blaufox, M. D.; Frohmuller, H. G.; Campbell, J. C.; Utz, D. C.; Orvis, A. L.; Owen, C. A. (March 1963). "Simplified method of estimating renal function with iodohippurate I-131". The Journal of Surgical Research. 3 (2): 122–125. doi:10.1016/s0022-4804(63)80042-6. ISSN 0022-4804. PMID 13971567.
- Blaufox, M. Donald; Lewis, Edmund J.; Jagger, Paul; Lauler, David; Hickler, Roger; Merrill, John P. (9 January 1969). "Physiologic Responses of the Transplanted Human Kidney: Sodium Regulation and Renin Secretion". New England Journal of Medicine. 280 (2): 62–66. doi:10.1056/NEJM196901092800202. ISSN 0028-4793. PMID 4881724.
- Blaufox, M. D.; Fromowitz, A.; Gruskin, A.; Meng, C. H.; Elkin, M. (August 1970). "Validation of use of xenon 133 to measure intrarenal distribution of blood flow". The American Journal of Physiology. 219 (2): 440–444. doi:10.1152/ajplegacy.1970.219.2.440. ISSN 0002-9513. PMID 5448074.
- Kostis, J. B.; Davis, B. R.; Cutler, J.; Grimm, R. H.; Berge, K. G.; Cohen, J. D.; Lacy, C. R.; Perry, H. M.; Blaufox, M. D.; Wassertheil-Smoller, S.; Black, H. R.; Schron, E.; Berkson, D. M.; Curb, J. D.; Smith, W. M.; McDonald, R.; Applegate, W. B. (16 July 1997). "Prevention of heart failure by antihypertensive drug treatment in older persons with isolated systolic hypertension. SHEP Cooperative Research Group". JAMA. 278 (3): 212–216. doi:10.1001/jama.1997.03550030052033. ISSN 0098-7484. PMID 9218667.
- Blaufox, M. D.; Fine, E. J.; Heller, S.; Hurley, J.; Jagust, M.; Li, Y.; Mann, S. J.; Pickering, T. G.; Zanzonico, P.; Zhang, C. G. (March 1998). "Prospective study of simultaneous orthoiodohippurate and diethylenetriaminepentaacetic acid captopril renography. The Einstein/Cornell Collaborative Hypertension Group". Journal of Nuclear Medicine. 39 (3): 522–528. ISSN 0161-5505. PMID 9529303.
