= Creole marble =

Marble from Georgia, United States

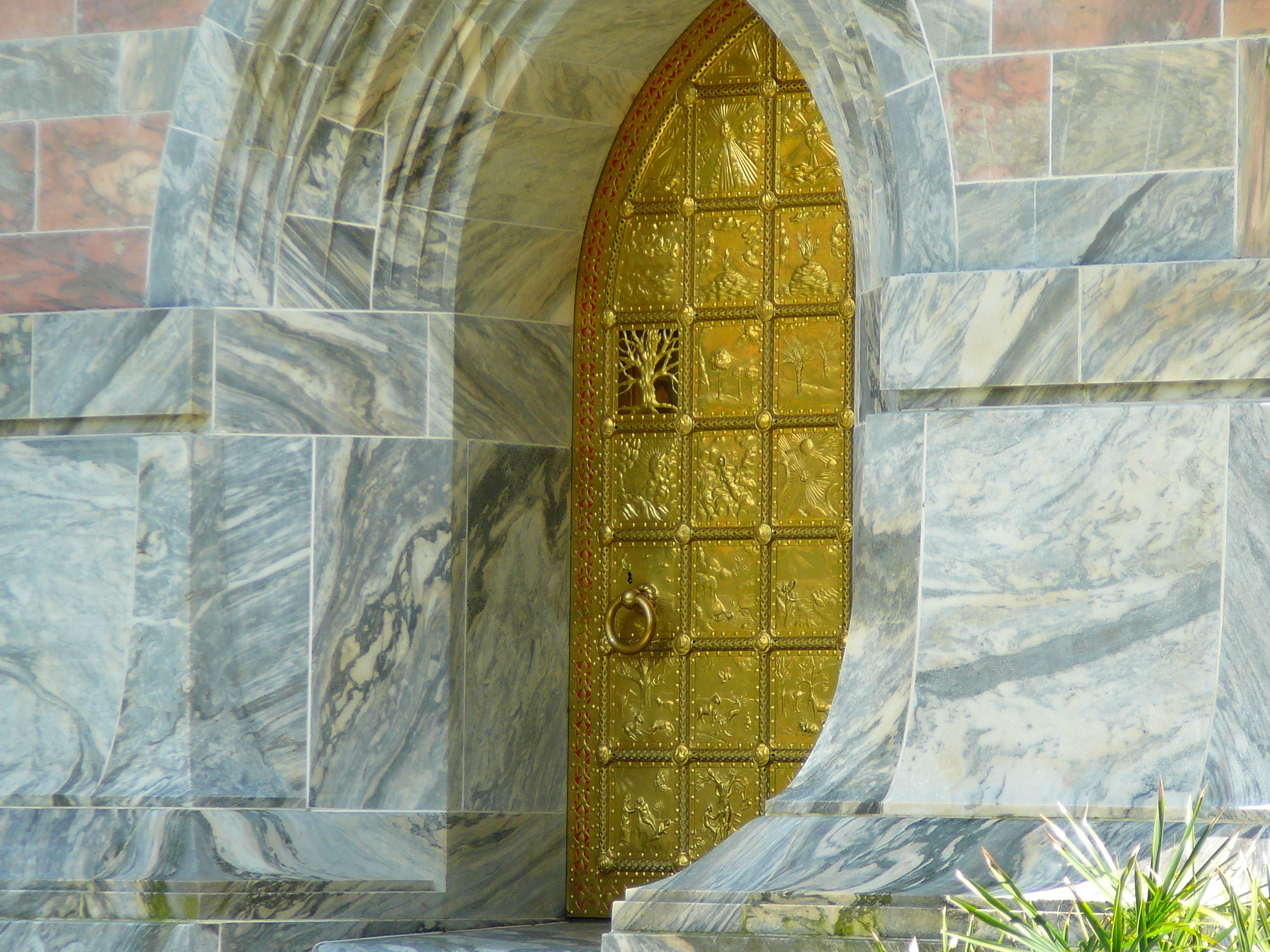
The portal to the Bok Tower shows blue-and-white Creole marble as well as the pink Etowah marble

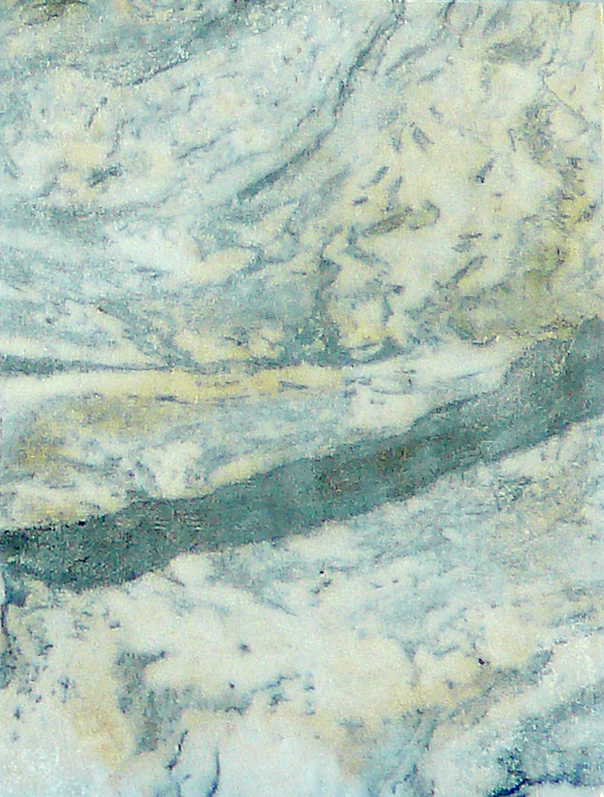
Creole marble sample

Creole marble, also called Georgia creole or Georgia marble, is a marble from quarries in Pickens County, Georgia, United States. It is coarse-grained, displays a white or gray background while veins or clouds are black or dark blue. Based on the tone and coloring it sold as Light Creole, Medium Creole, and Dark Creole.

Creole marble has been used extensively in buildings and monuments in the United States.

== Notable buildings with Creole marble ==
- United States Capitol, Washington, DC
- Marriner S. Eccles Federal Reserve Board Building, Washington, DC
- John Adams Building, Washington, DC
- One Georgia Center, Georgia
- Carillon, Bok Tower Gardens, Florida
- Capitol of Puerto Rico, Puerto Rico

== See also ==
- Etowah marble
- Georgia Marble Company: a creole marble quarry
- List of types of marble
