= Allen Memorial Medical Library =

- U.S. National Register of Historic Places
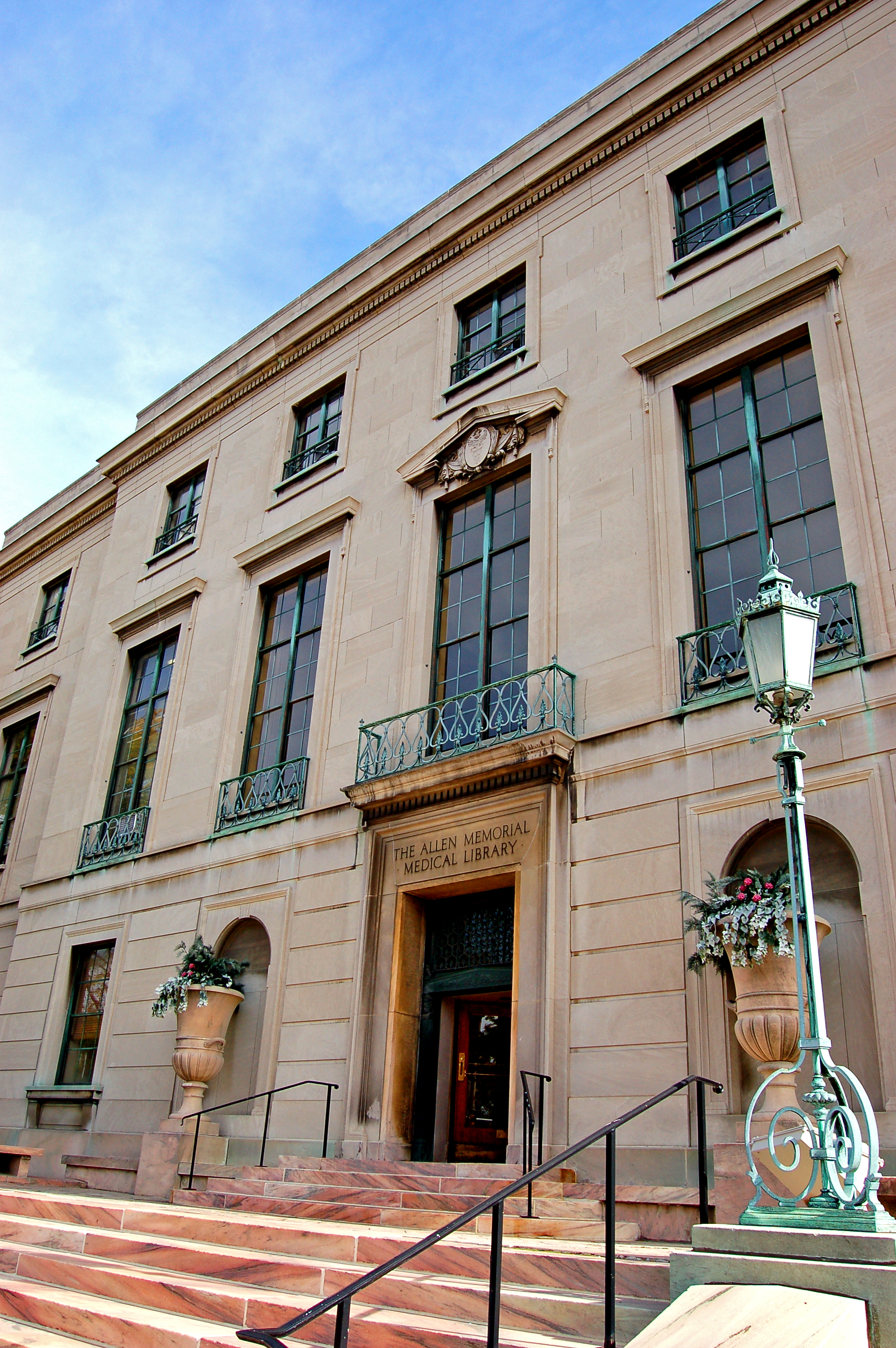
- Front façade of the Allen Memorial Library

- Location within Cleveland Location within Ohio Location within the United States
- Location: Cleveland, Ohio
- Coordinates: 41°30′21.44″N 81°36′30.58″W
- Architect: Walker and Weeks
- Architectural style: Classical Revival
- NRHP reference No.: 82001365
- Added to NRHP: November 30, 1982

Allen Memorial Medical Library is located along Euclid Avenue on the campus of Case Western Reserve University in Cleveland, Ohio. Completed in 1926, the building was named in honor of Dudley P. Allen. Designed by the Cleveland firm of Walker and Weeks in a classical revival style, it was constructed with Indiana limestone on a pink Georgia marble base. It was listed in the National Register of Historic Places in 1982 and is a Cleveland Landmark. Along with serving as a library, the building's 450 seat auditorium serves as classroom for students of Case Western Reserve University.

In addition to housing a portion of the Cleveland Health Sciences Library (CHSL), it is also home of the Dittrick Museum of Medical History. The building is managed by the Cleveland Medical Library Association (CMLA) in a partnership with Case Western Reserve University.

== Historic uses ==
- Library
