= Dudley Peter Allen =

American surgeon, teacher, and writer

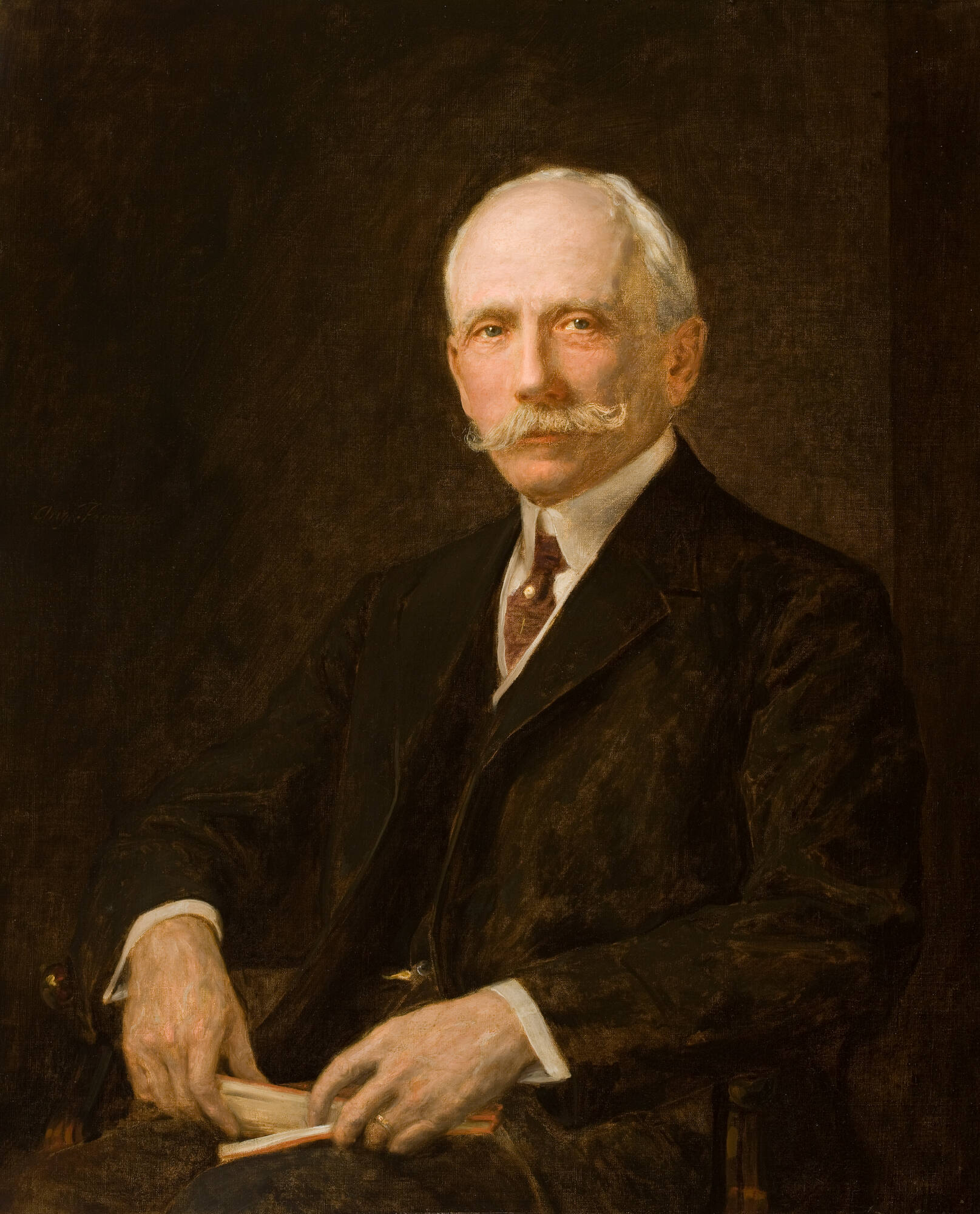
- 1915 posthumous portrait (from a photograph), by August Franzén
- Born: March 25, 1852; Kinsman, Ohio
- Died: January 6, 1915 (aged 62); New York City
- Spouse: Elisabeth Severance (m. 1892)

Dudley Peter Allen (25 March 1852 – 6 January 1915) was an American surgeon, teacher, writer, and art patron.

He was born in a family of physicians and was educated first at Oberlin College and later Harvard Medical School, becoming an M.D. in 1879. After briefly working in Massachusetts General Hospital, he went to Europe to attend medical and surgical lectures and clinics in Berlin, Vienna, London, Paris, and other medical centers. In 1883, he settled in Cleveland where he began a surgical career in the department of surgery in the Western Reserve University, where in time he became professor of surgery and clinical surgery.

He joined the surgical staff of the Lakeside Hospital where ultimately he became surgeon-in-chief. His professional practice rapidly grew to large proportions, and he was frequently called for operations or consultations to distant parts of the state and even beyond it. During all this time he was a frequent contributor to medical literature, and an active supporter and a patron of the Cleveland Medical Library. On August 4, 1892, he married the local wealthy philanthropist Elisabeth Severance in Cleveland.

He wrote a chapter in the 1887 Magazine of Western History where he described his predecessor, Horace A. Ackley, a brilliant man of many talents, "On the organization of the medical College in Cleveland, he was appointed to the chair of surgery, which he occupied until 1855."

He held many honorary positions during his life. At one time he was president of the Ohio State Medical Society, and for a number of years was secretary, and finally president (1906–1907), of the American Surgical Association. About this time he was elected an honorary fellow of the Philadelphia Academy of Surgery, and later was awarded the degree of LL. D. from his alma mater, Oberlin. In 1910, he retired his medical positions and traveled around the world with his wife.

He was an art collector of paintings and engravings, but especially of old Chinese porcelains. On this subject, he became a recognized expert.

Allen died suddenly of pneumonia in New York City on Wednesday, January 6, 1915, aged 62.

== Legacy ==
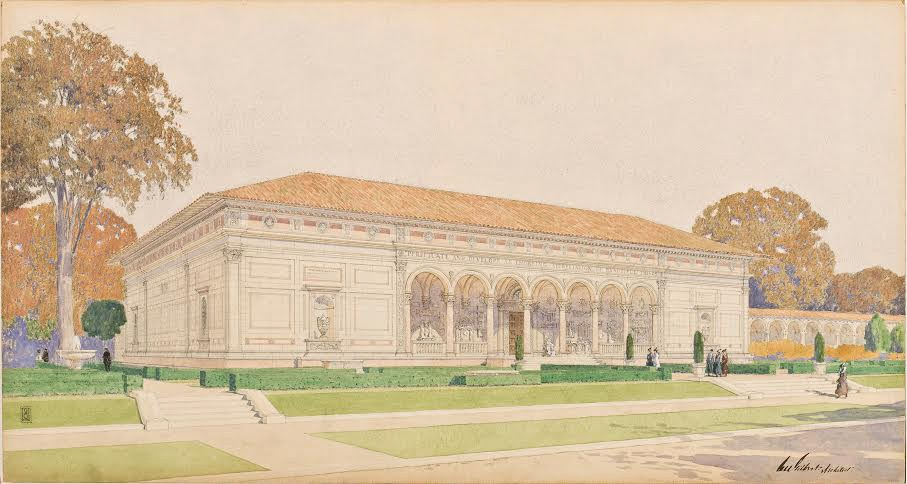
Drawing of Oberlin's Allen Memorial Art Museum upon completion in 1917, by its architect, Cass Gilbert

After his death, Allen's widow commissioned several buildings in his name; most notably the estate "Glen Allen" where she lived the rest of her life, the local medical library, and the Oberlin Art museum. While working on finishing his work expanding St. Luke's hospital, she met and married her second husband, Francis Fleury Prentiss, who had taken over Allen's position.

== Sources ==
- Biography written by George Howard Monks : Kelly, Howard A.; Burrage, Walter L. (eds.). "Allen, Dudley Peter" . American Medical Biographies . Baltimore: The Norman, Remington Company.
