= Libuše Niklová =

Czech toy designer (1934–1981)

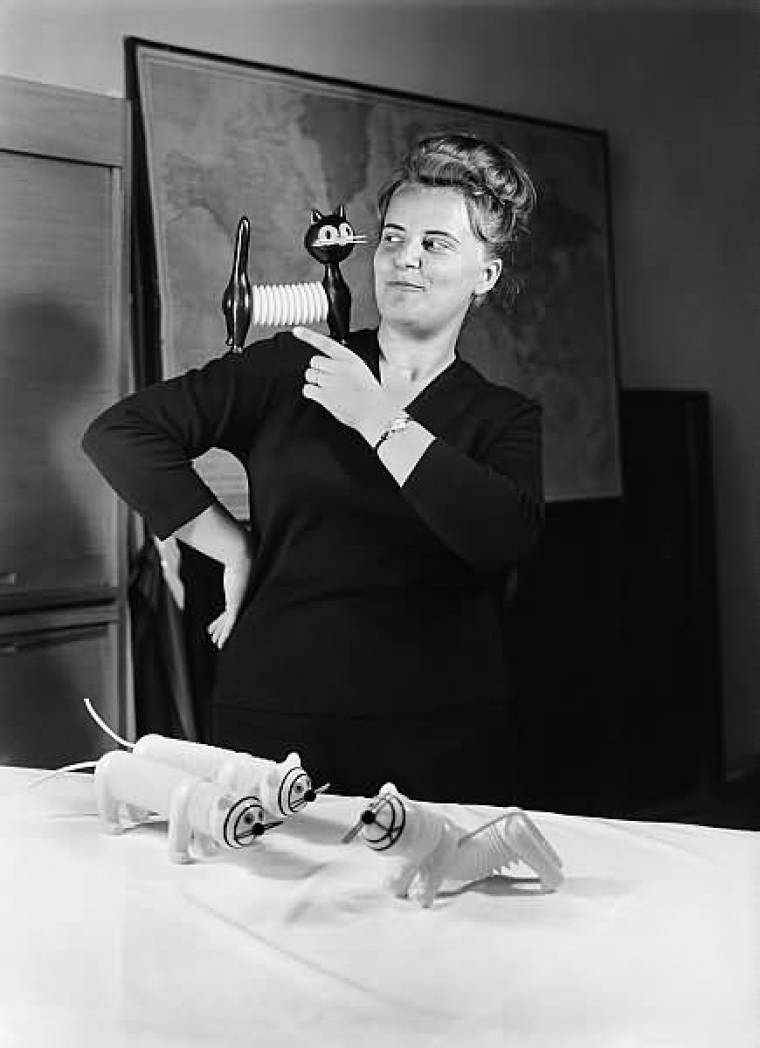
- Libuse Niklova and her Tomcat "Líba" in 1964
- Born: Libuše Kyseláková; 1 April 1934; Zlín, Czechoslovakia
- Died: 5 June 1981 (aged 47); Zlin, Czechoslovakia
- Occupation: Toy designer
- Years active: 1954–1981
- Known for: Accordion animal toys and inflatable sitting toys
- Partner: František Nikl
- Website: libuseniklova.com

Libuše Niklová (née Kyselaková) (1 April 1934 – 5 June 1981) was a Czech toy designer and national treasure. A world-renowned designer and innovator, she created over 230 original toys. Well-known are her rubber figurines, accordion animals, and inflatable toys. Her work is represented in museum collections around the world, including at the Musée des Arts décoratifs in Paris, the Museum of Modern Art in New York, the Victoria and Albert Museum in London, the National Museum of Modern Art in Tokyo, and the Museum of Decorative Arts in Prague in Prague. In 2012, on the occasion of the annual Czech Grand Design Awards, she was the first female designer ever to be inducted into the Hall of Fame.

== Life ==
Niklová was born on 1 April 1934 in Zlín as Libuše Kyseláková. In the years 1949 to 1953, she studied, then a new field, the shaping of plastic materials at the Zdeněk Nejedlý State School of Applied Arts in Zlín and Uherské Hradiště. After graduating in 1954, she joined the Gumotex factory in Břeclav, where she worked until 1964. In 1958, she married the painter František Nikl, a high school classmate. In 1960, they had a son, the Czech painter, writer, and theater artist Petr Nikl, and in 1968 a daughter. In 1961, Niklová started working at Fatra Napajedla. During the course of her career, she obtained patents for nine inventions and three national industrial designs. She died on 5 June 1981, in Gottwaldov (Zlín).

== Gumotex ==
At Gumotex Břeclav, where she worked after graduation, Niklová mainly designed squeaky rubber toys, primarily figures and animals. These were initially made from pressed and foam rubber, then from blown PVC, and in the 1960s, cast from PVC and hand-dyed with latex paints. She also created souvenir toys, including for the 2nd Czechoslovak Spartakiad or the Brno Fairs and Exhibitions.

== Fatra ==
After the birth of her son Peter, Niklová worked at Fatra Napajedla, from 1961 to 1980. Among her most famous creations are a black accordion tomcat, a ram, and a crocodile. She also designed the packaging in which the unassembled toy, a construction kit, was sold. She also designed inflatable and squeaky toys for small children. From the 1970s, she began designing larger inflatable and sit-on toys that were lightweight and washable. The Horse, the Rhinoceros, the Caterpillar, the Giraffe, the Lion, and the Polar Bear were among the followers of the Buffalo, whose prototype was created in 1971. Serial production began in 1973.

== Creations ==
Niklová created over 230 original toys, many of which were produced in many color variants.

Rubber squeaky toys
for Gumotex Břeclav, 1954–1964

Niklová designed 62 rubber toys, most of them squeaky, with the exception of a few dolls that do not have a squeaker. Many of these toys were also produced in several color variants, hand-dyed with latex paints. She also designed a few toys as souvenirs, for example for the Spartakiad or Brno fairs and exhibitions.

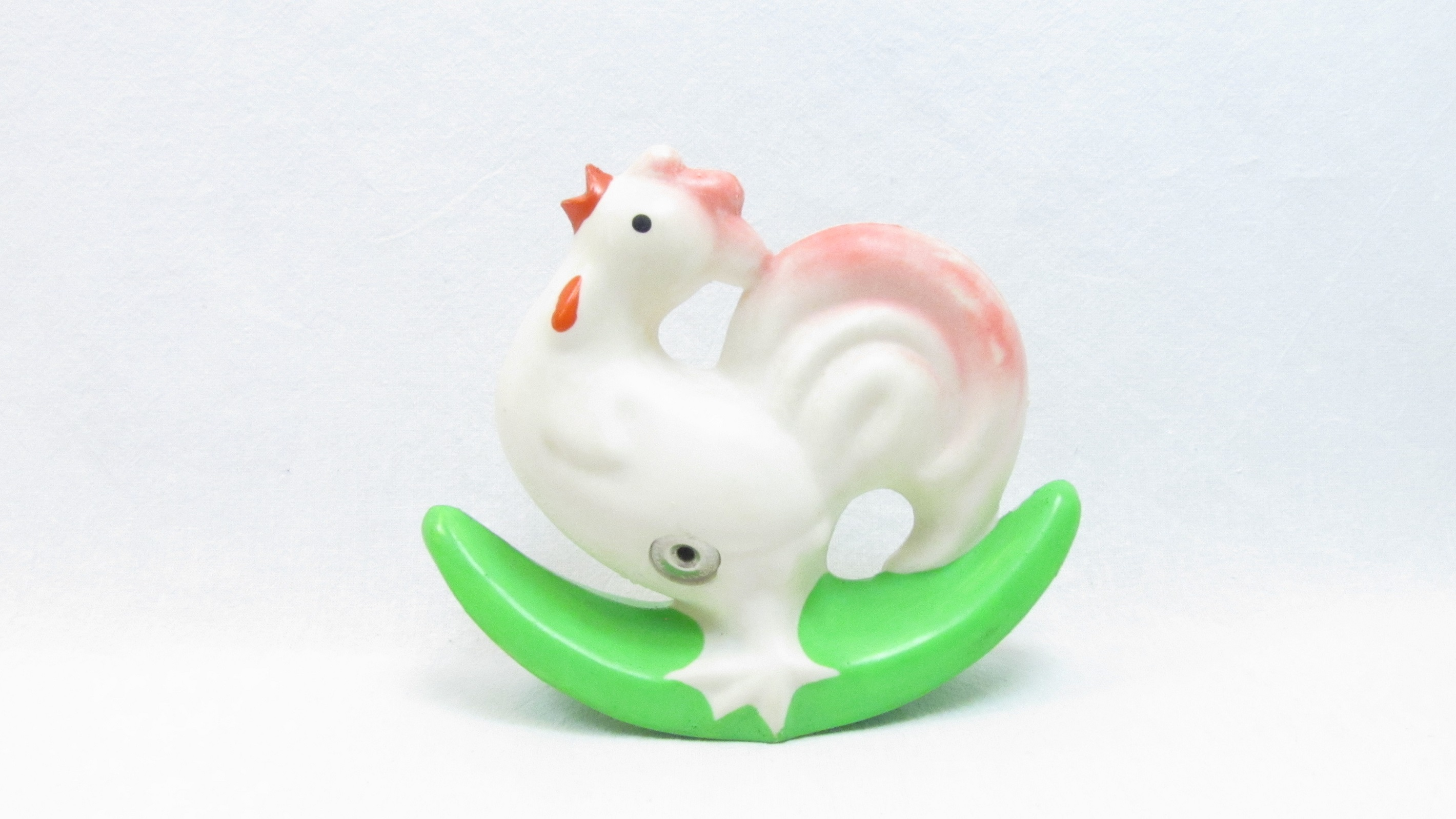
Rocking rooster, 1954

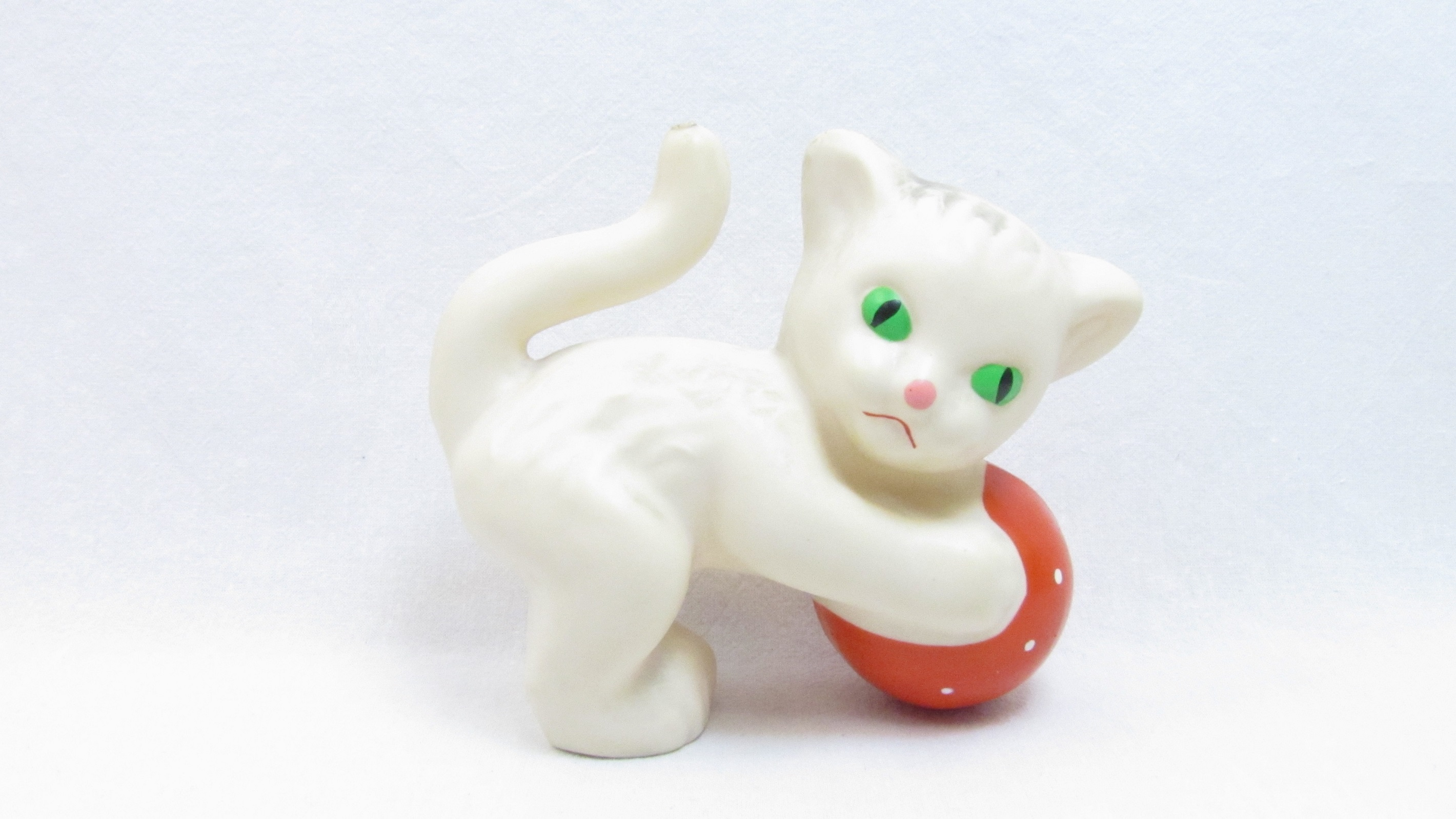
Kitty with a ball, 1956

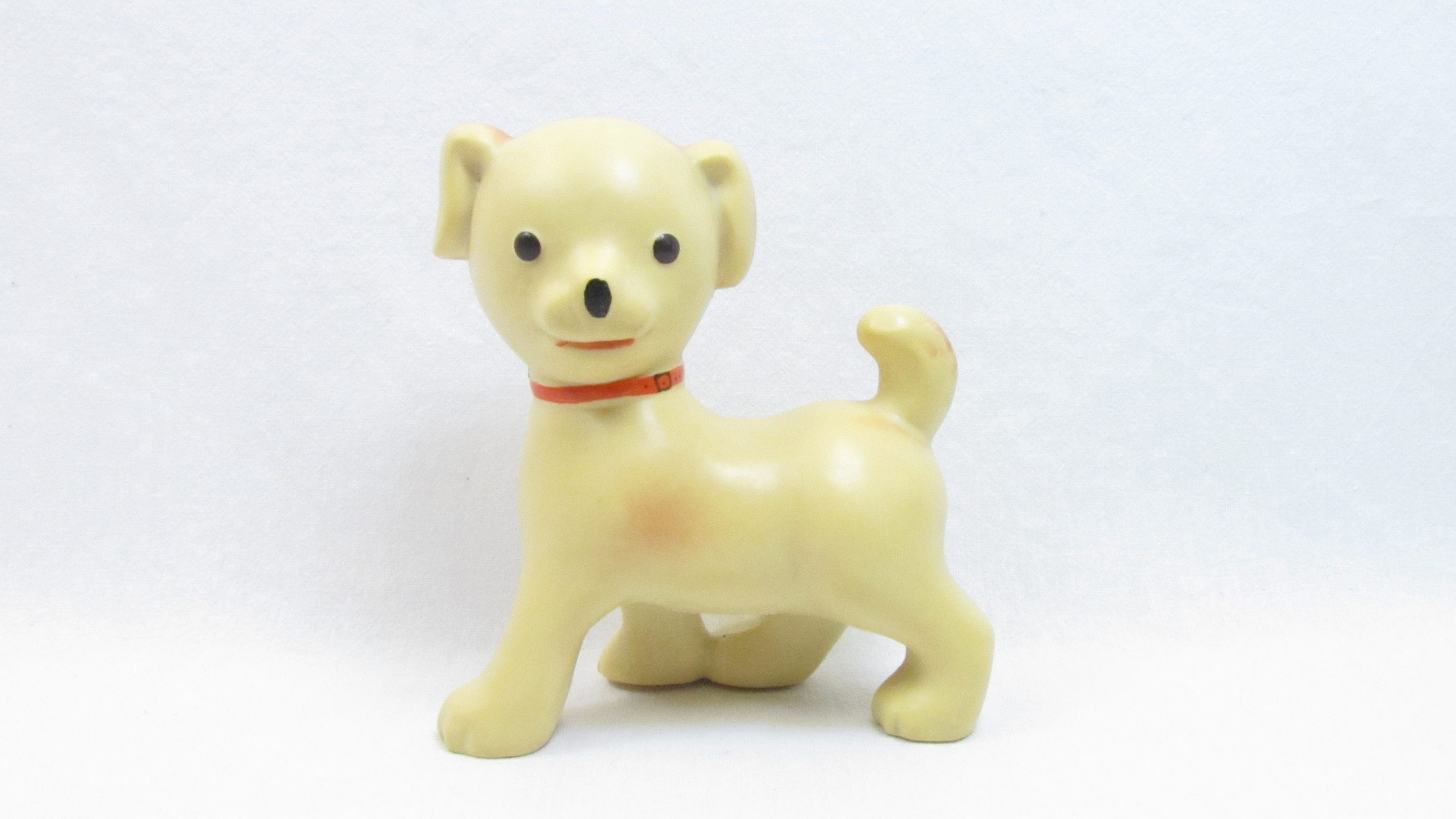
Alík the dog, 1956

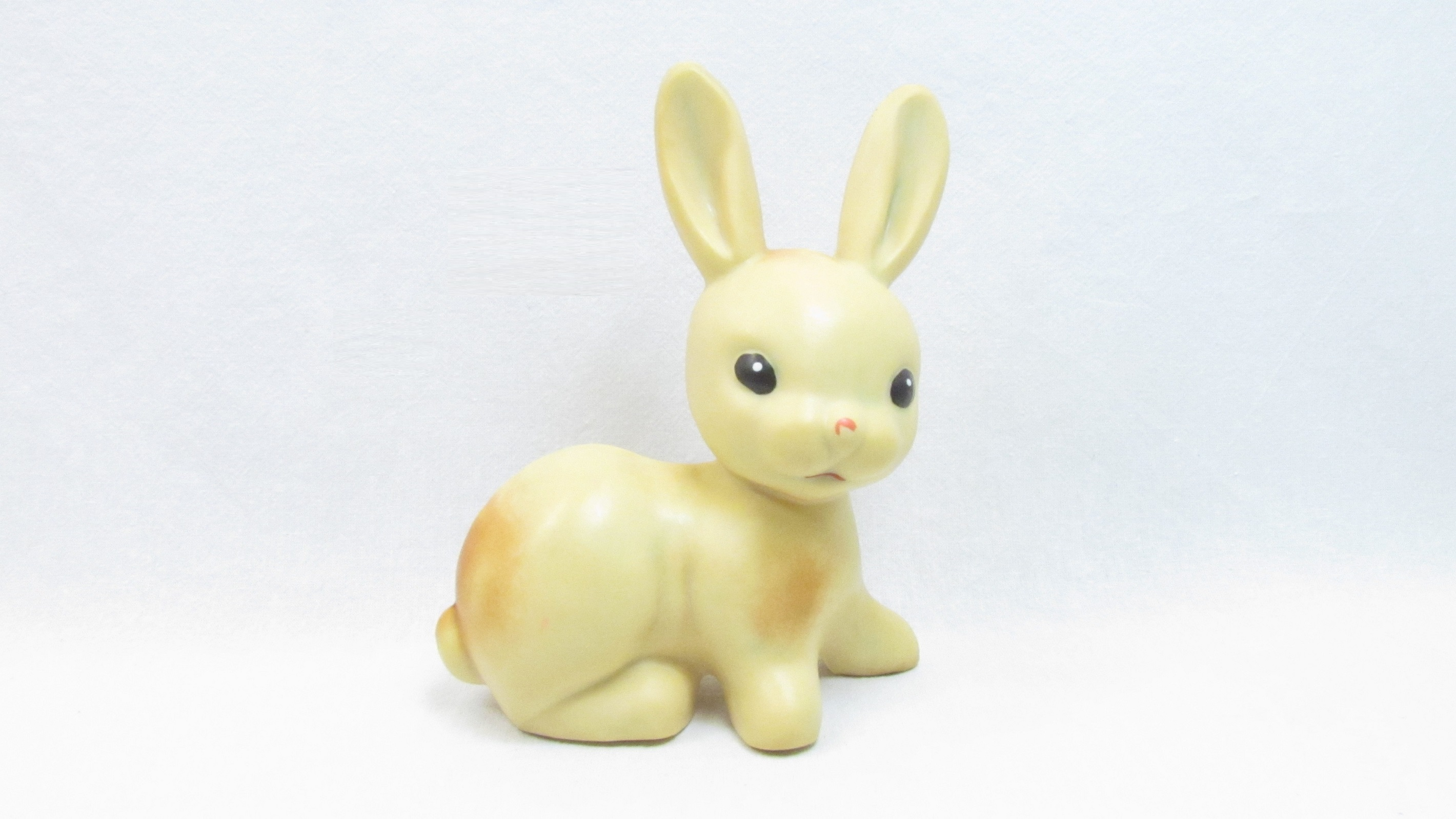
Bunny, 1956

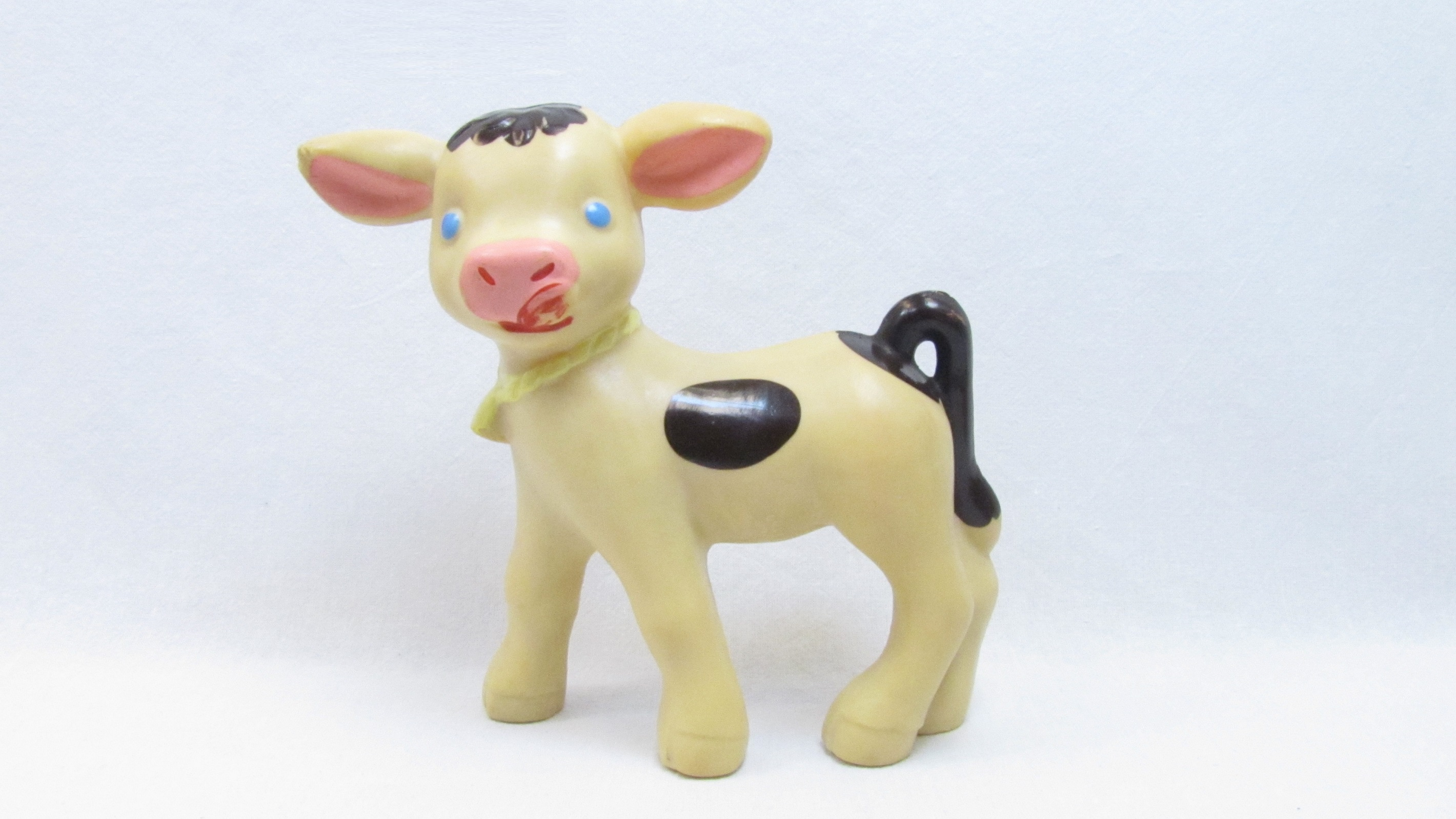
Calf, 1956

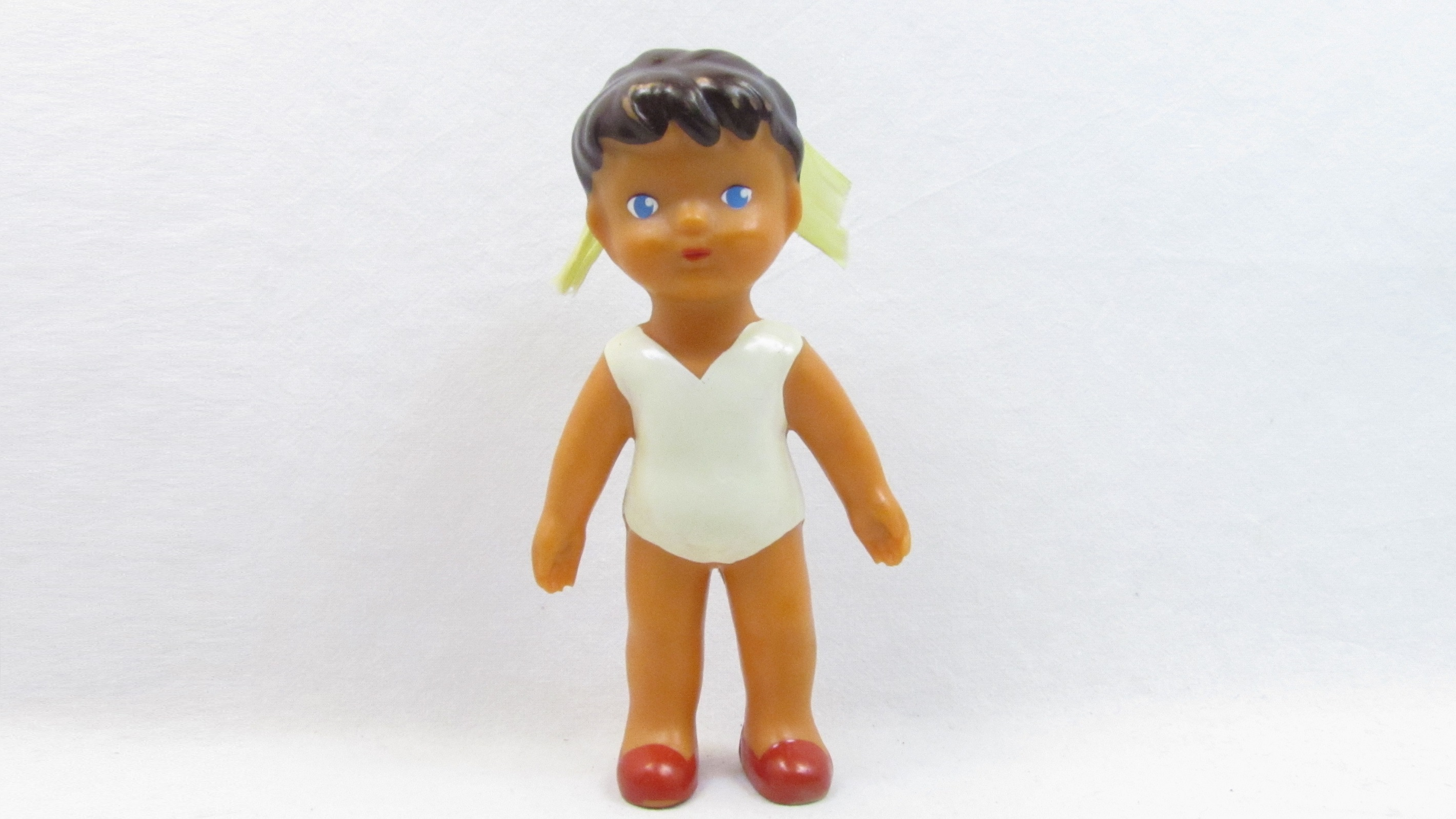
Libuška, 1957

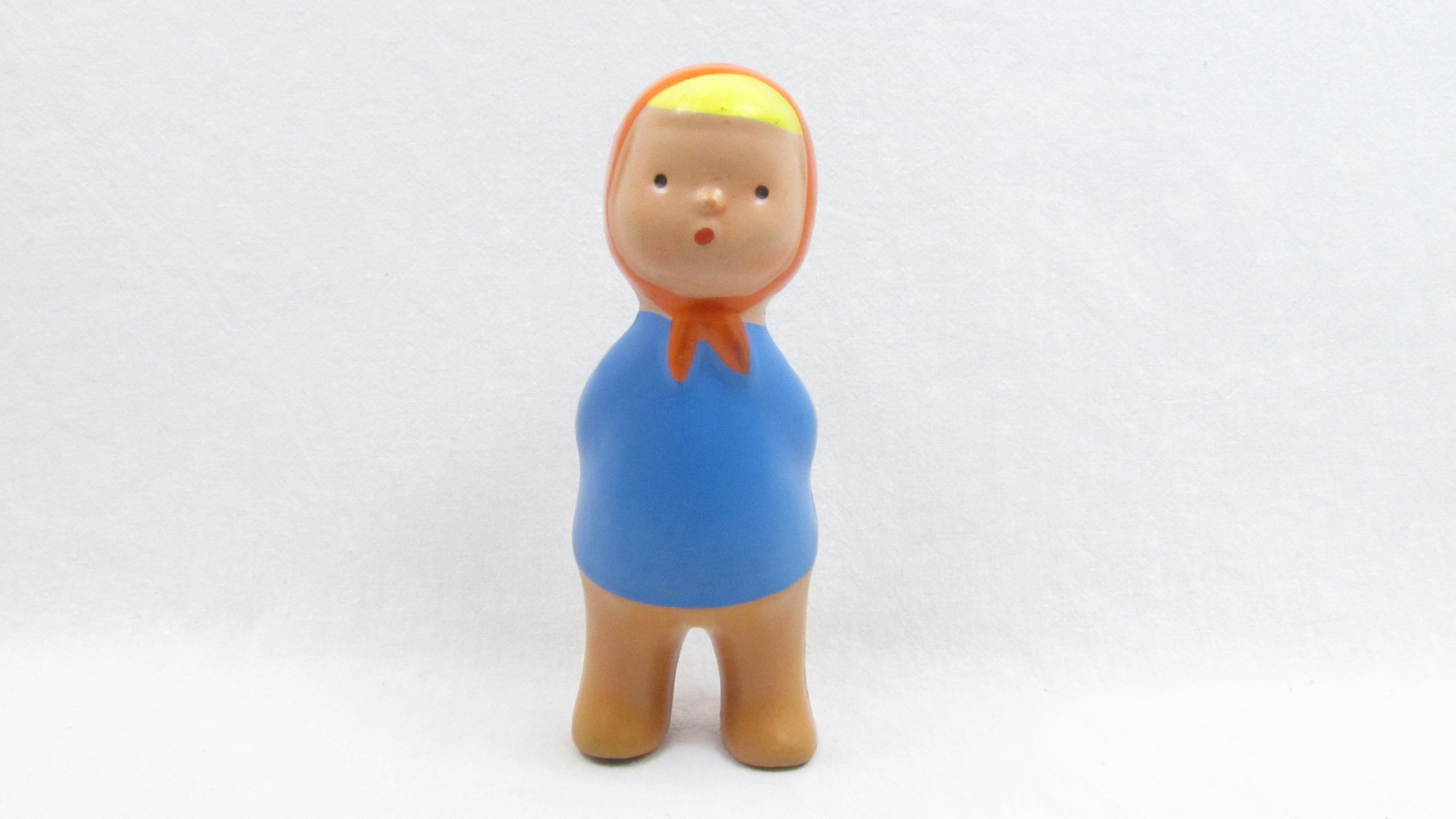
Hanka, 1958

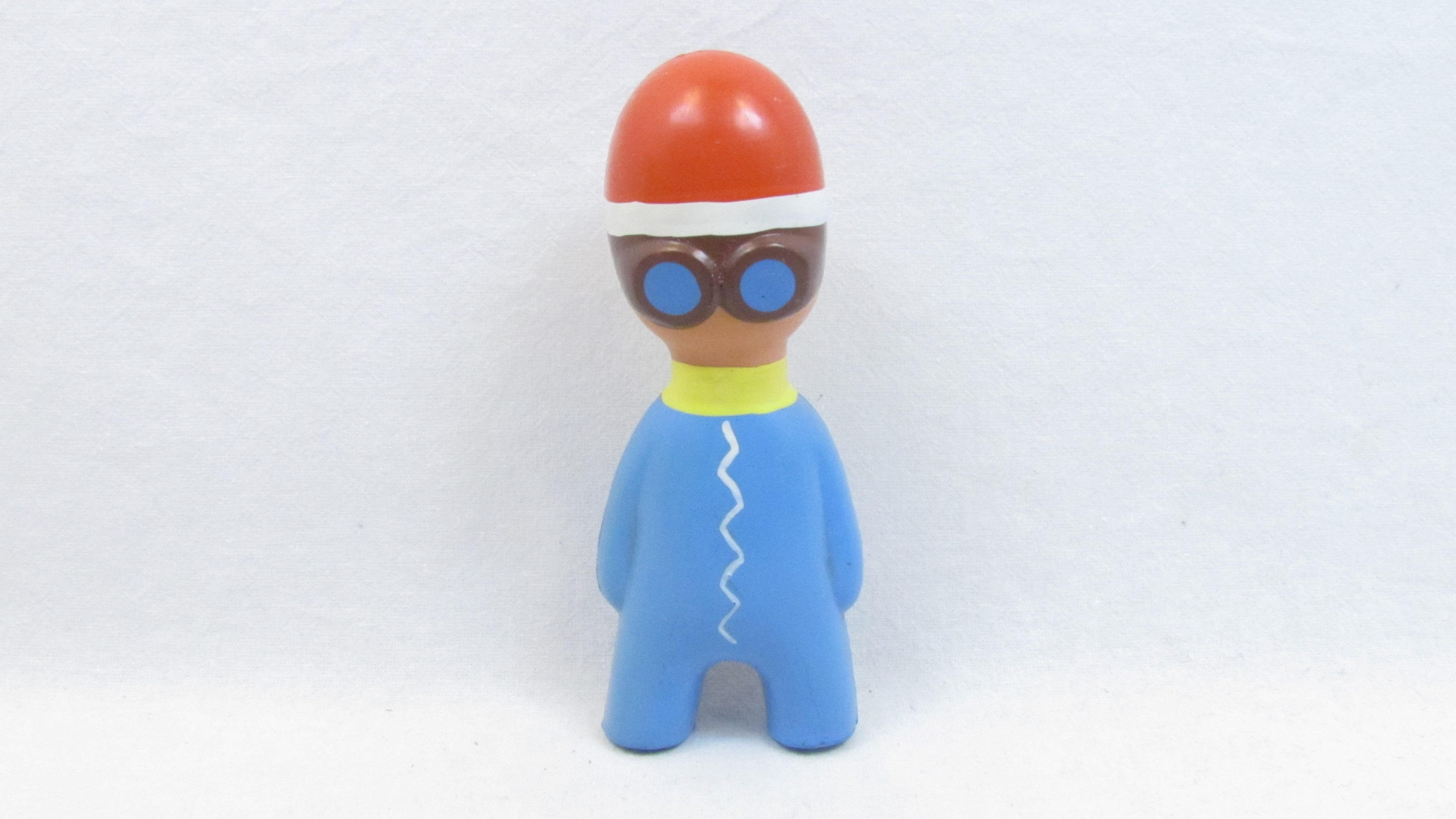
Motorcyclist, 1964

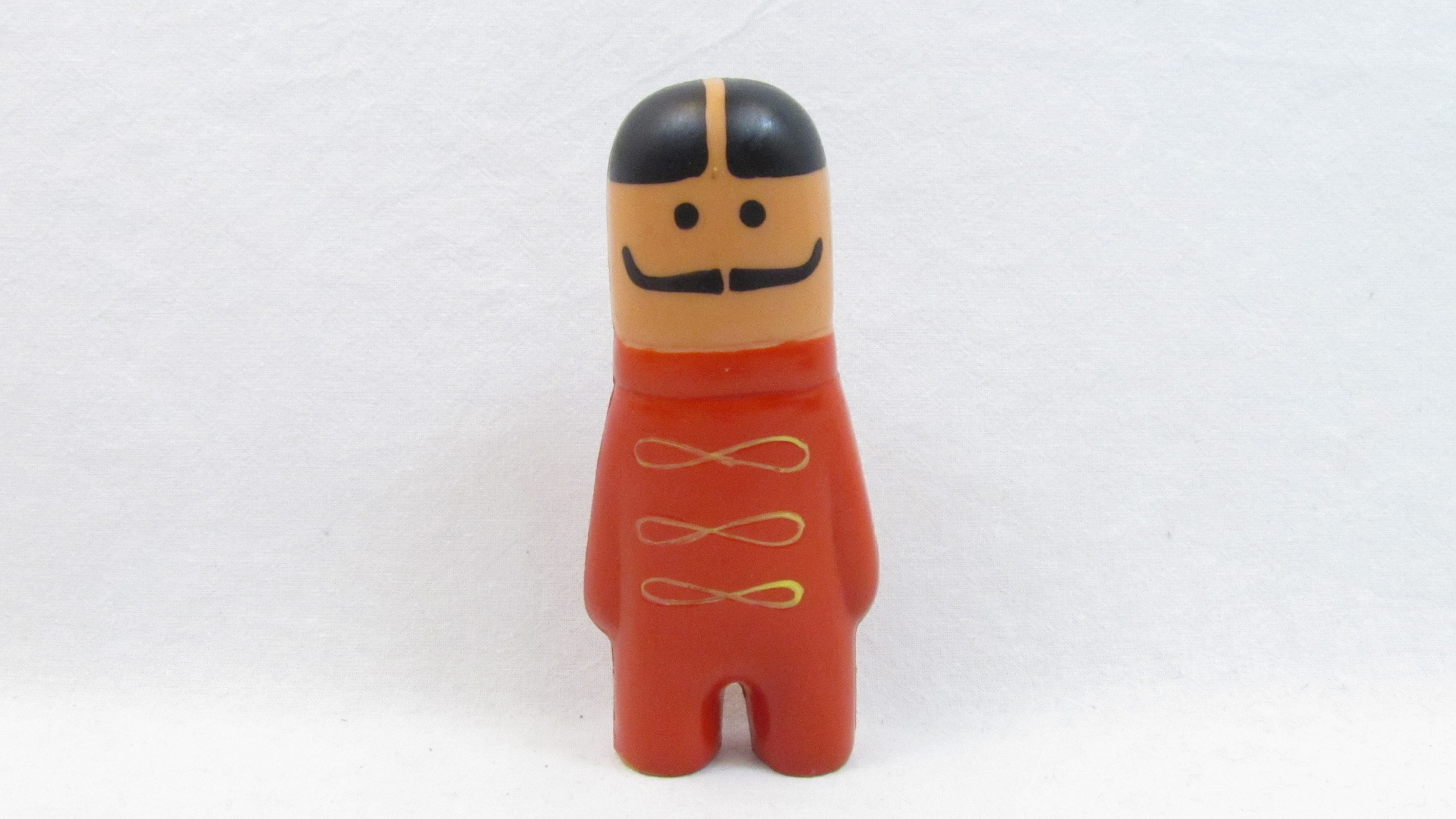
Tamer, 1964

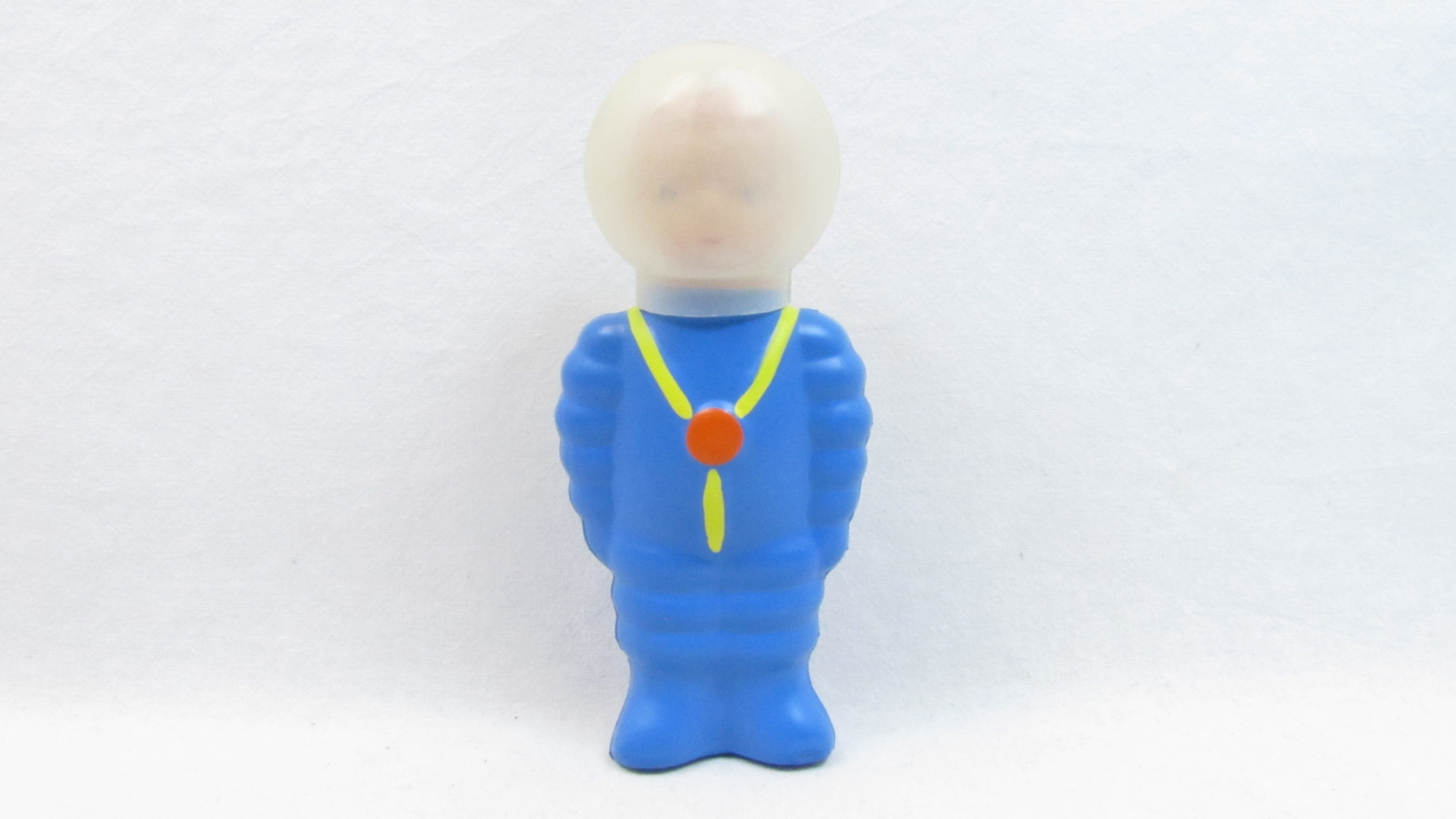
Cosmonaut, 1964

Accordion toys
for Fatra Napajedla, 1963–1967

Niklová designed twelve accordion toys, ten animals, a baby, and a train called Toot-Toot.

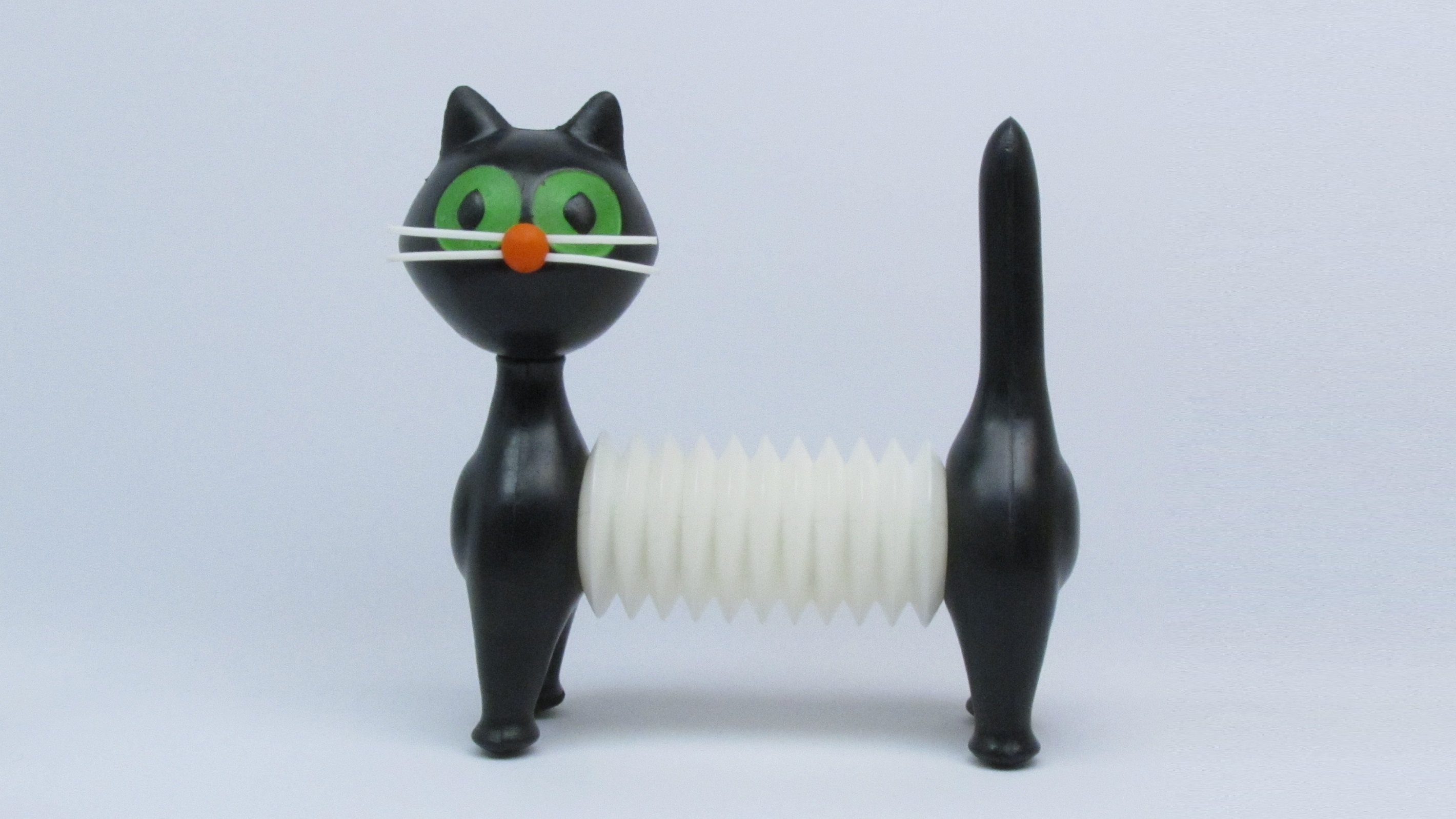
Líba the tomcat, 1963

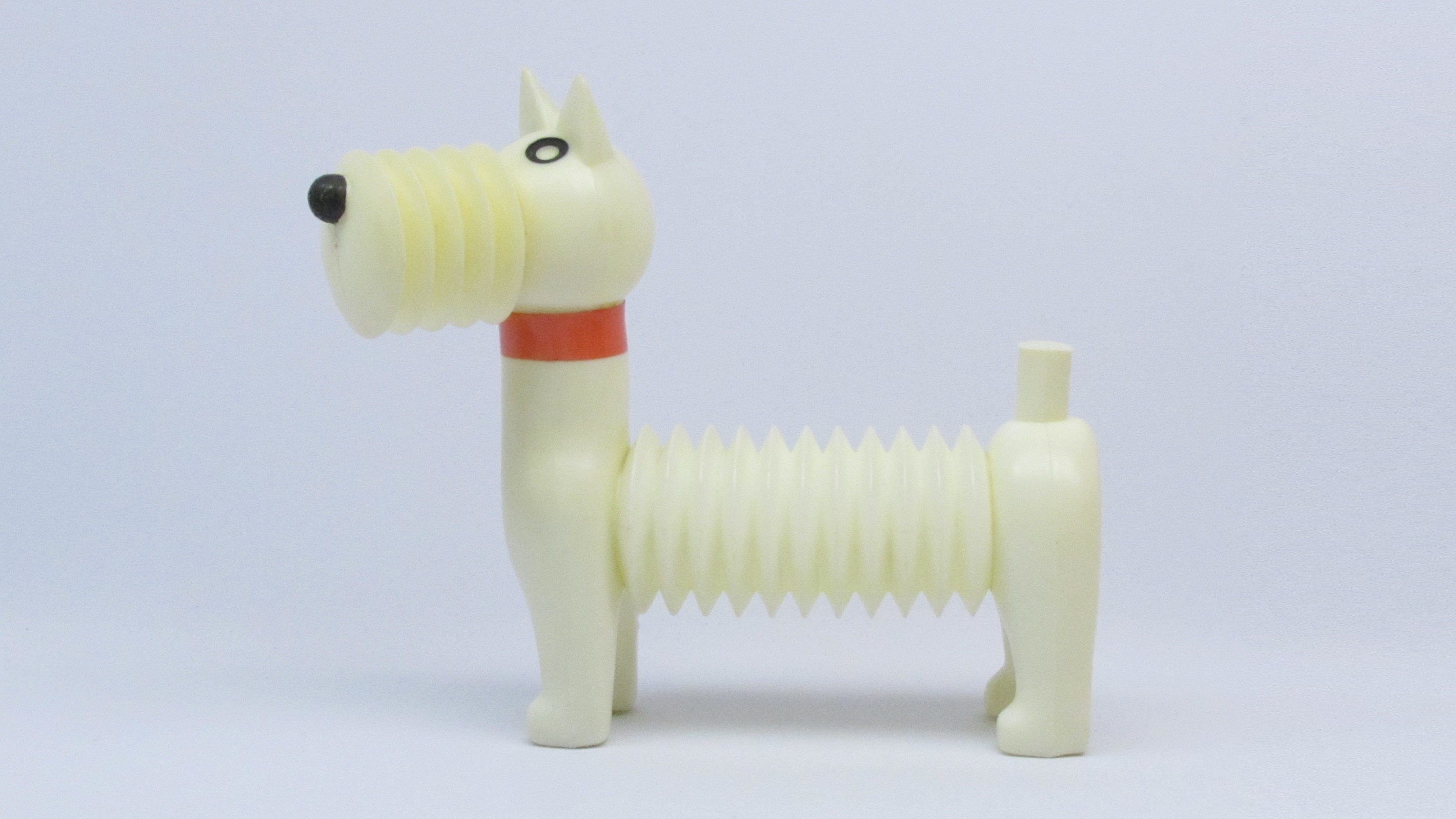
Rafan the dog, 1965

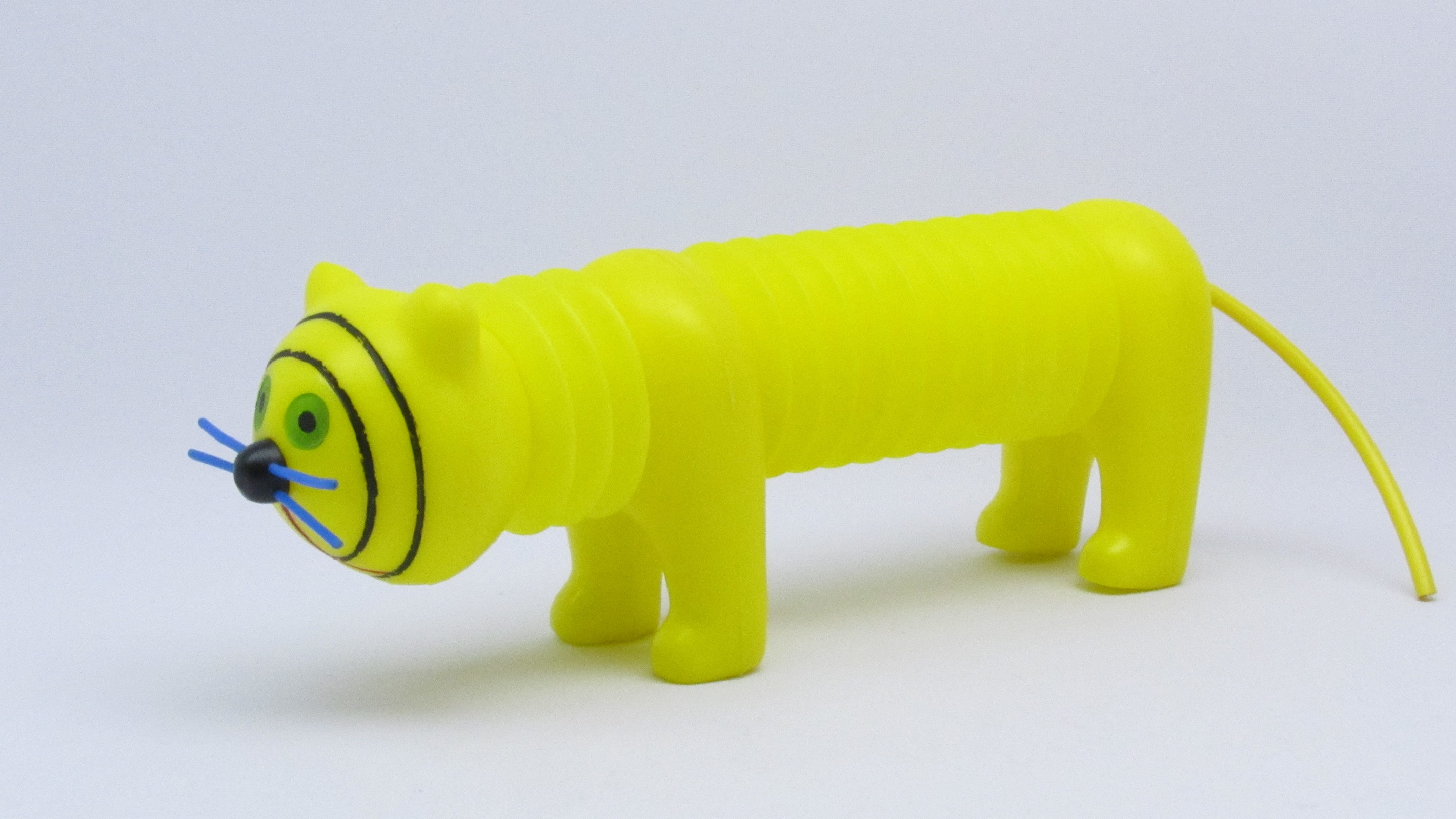
Tiger, 1964

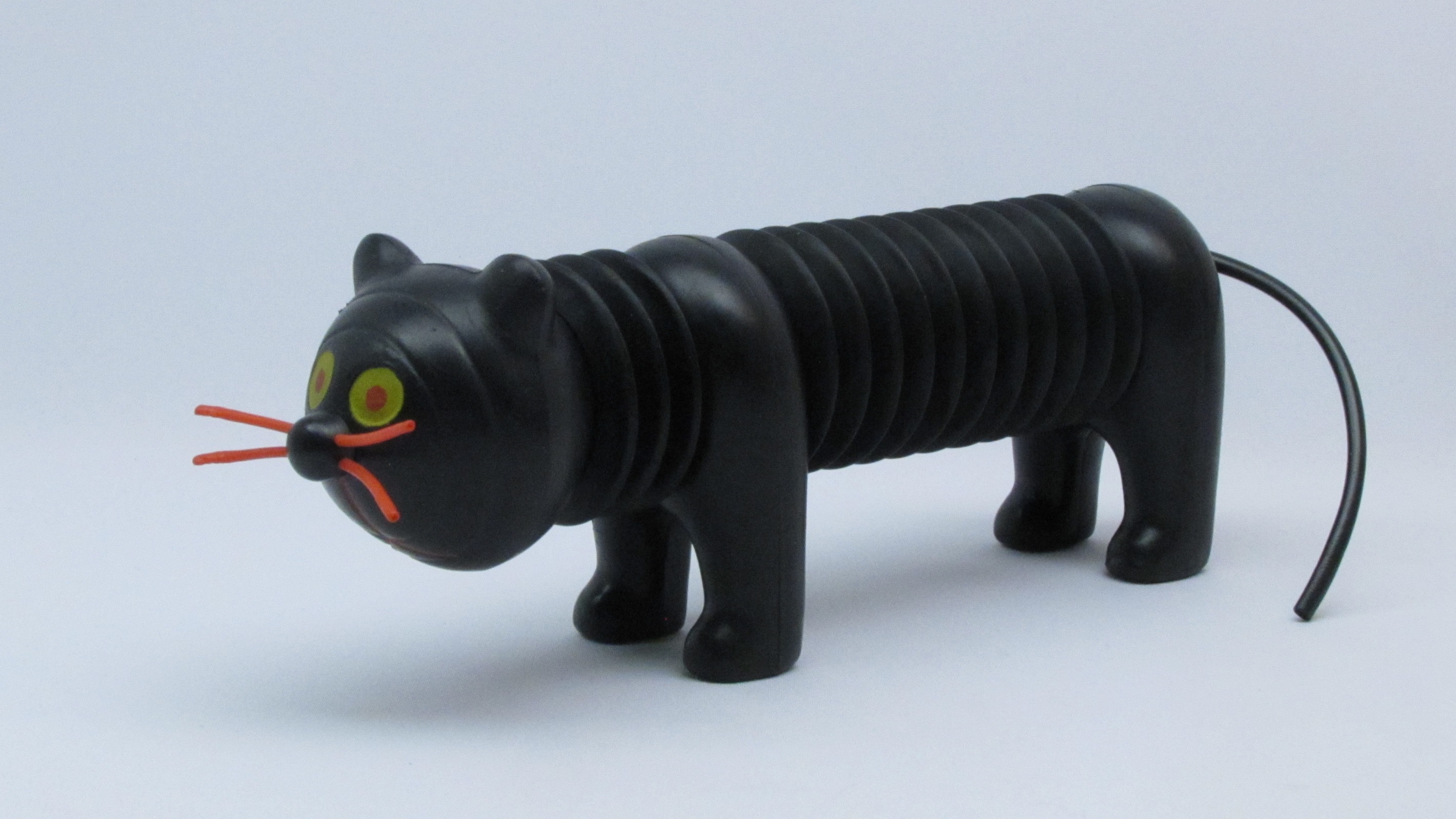
Panther, 1964

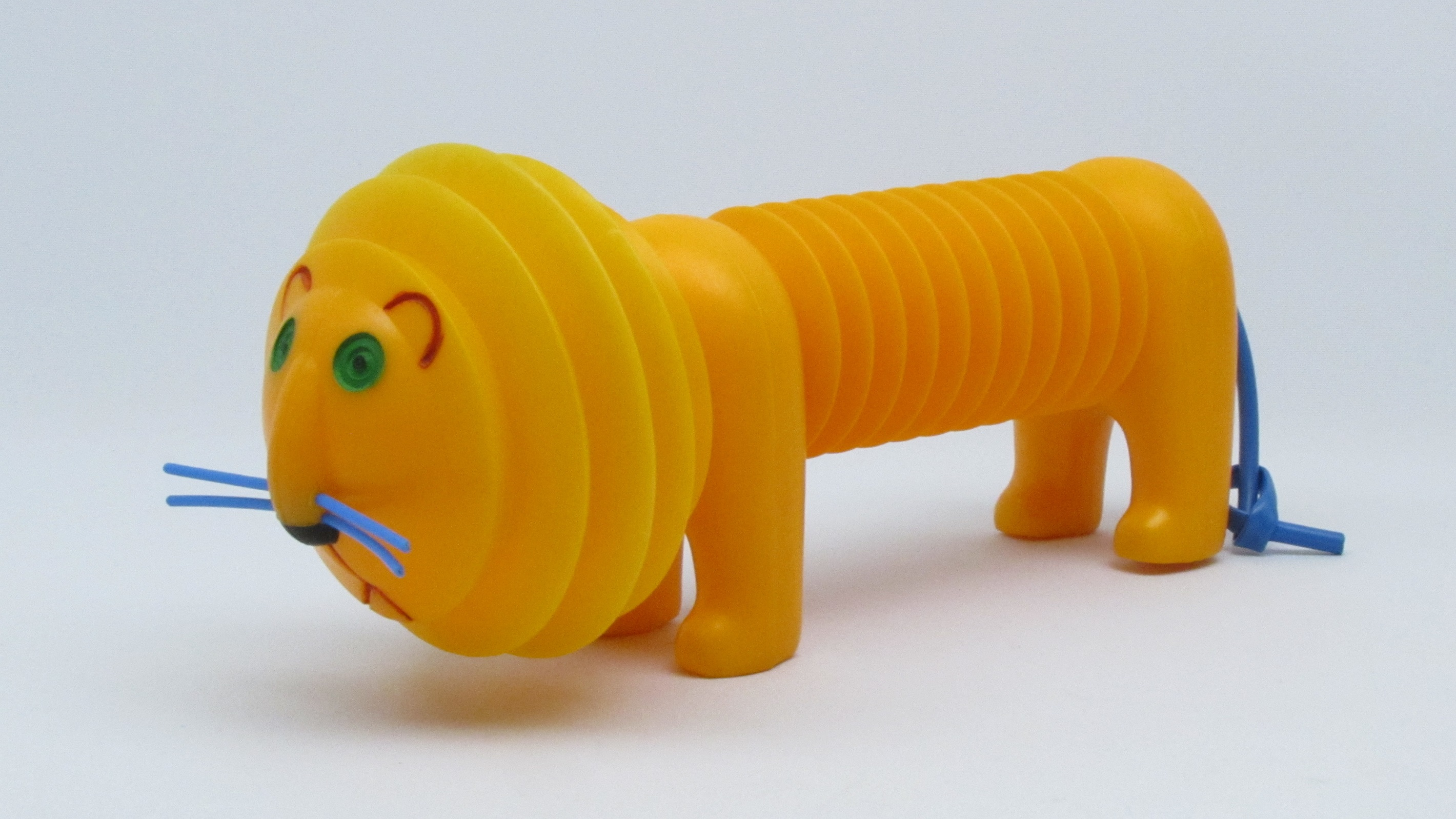
Lion, 1964

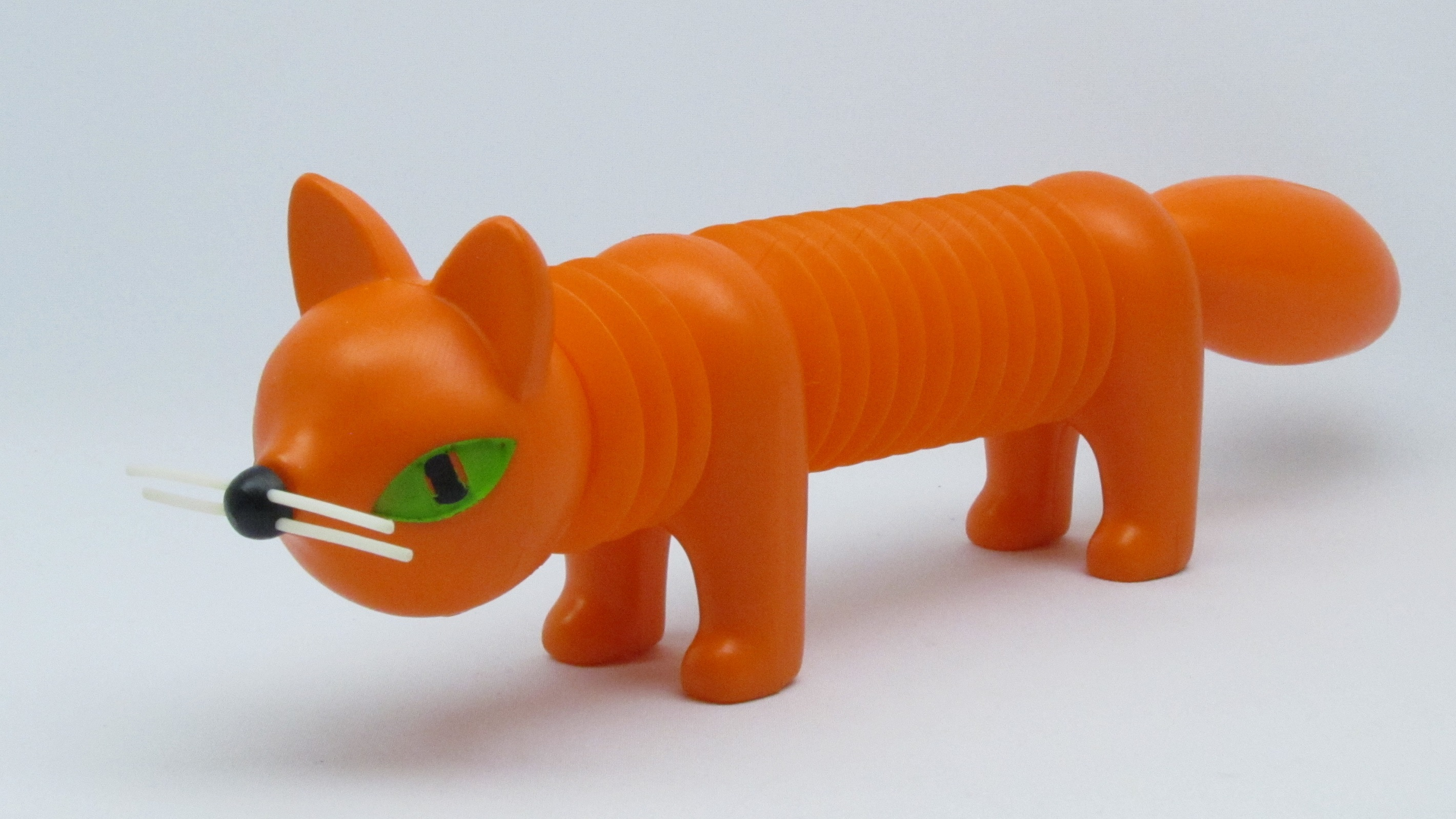
Fox, 1964

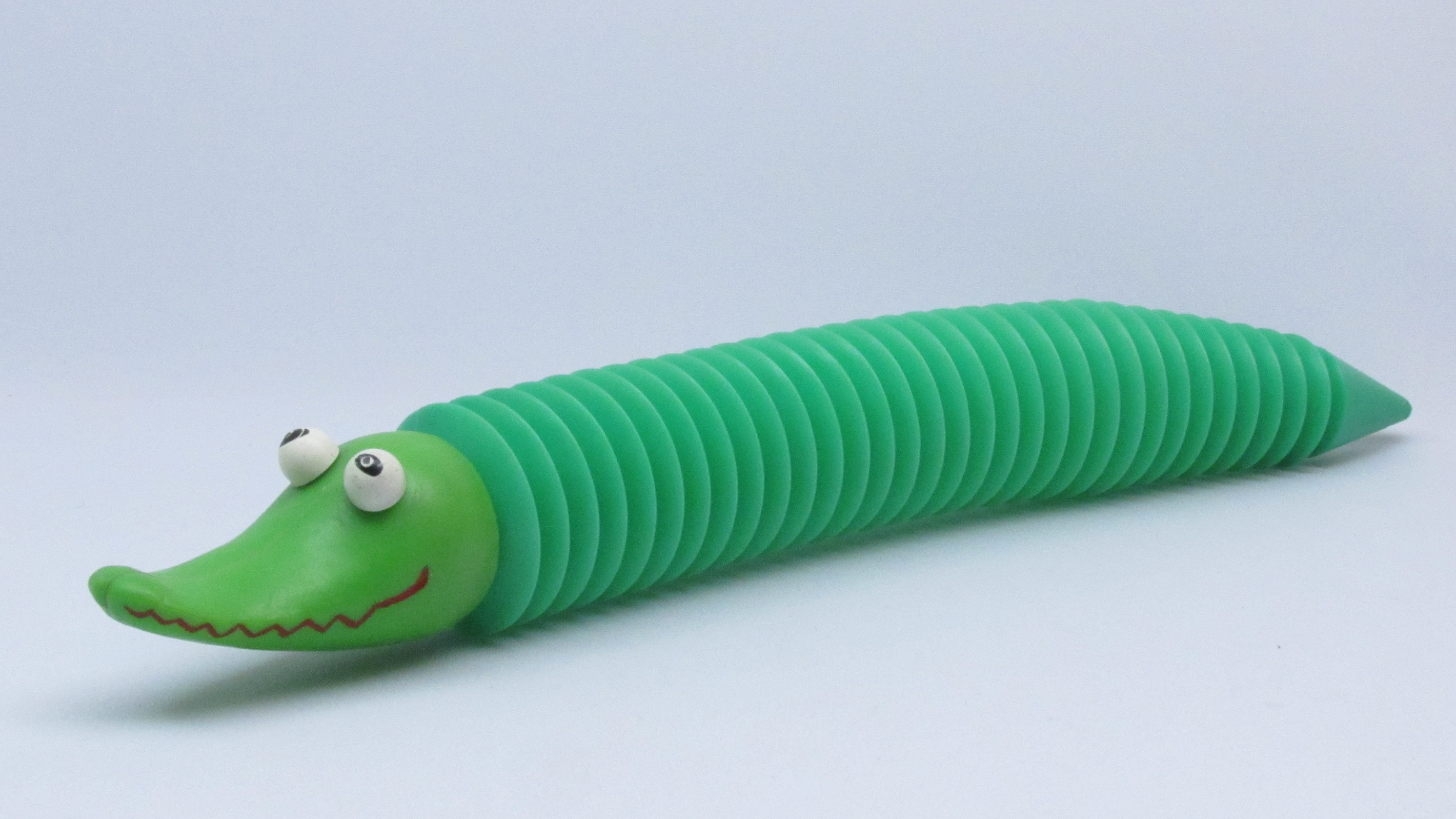
Crocodile, 1964

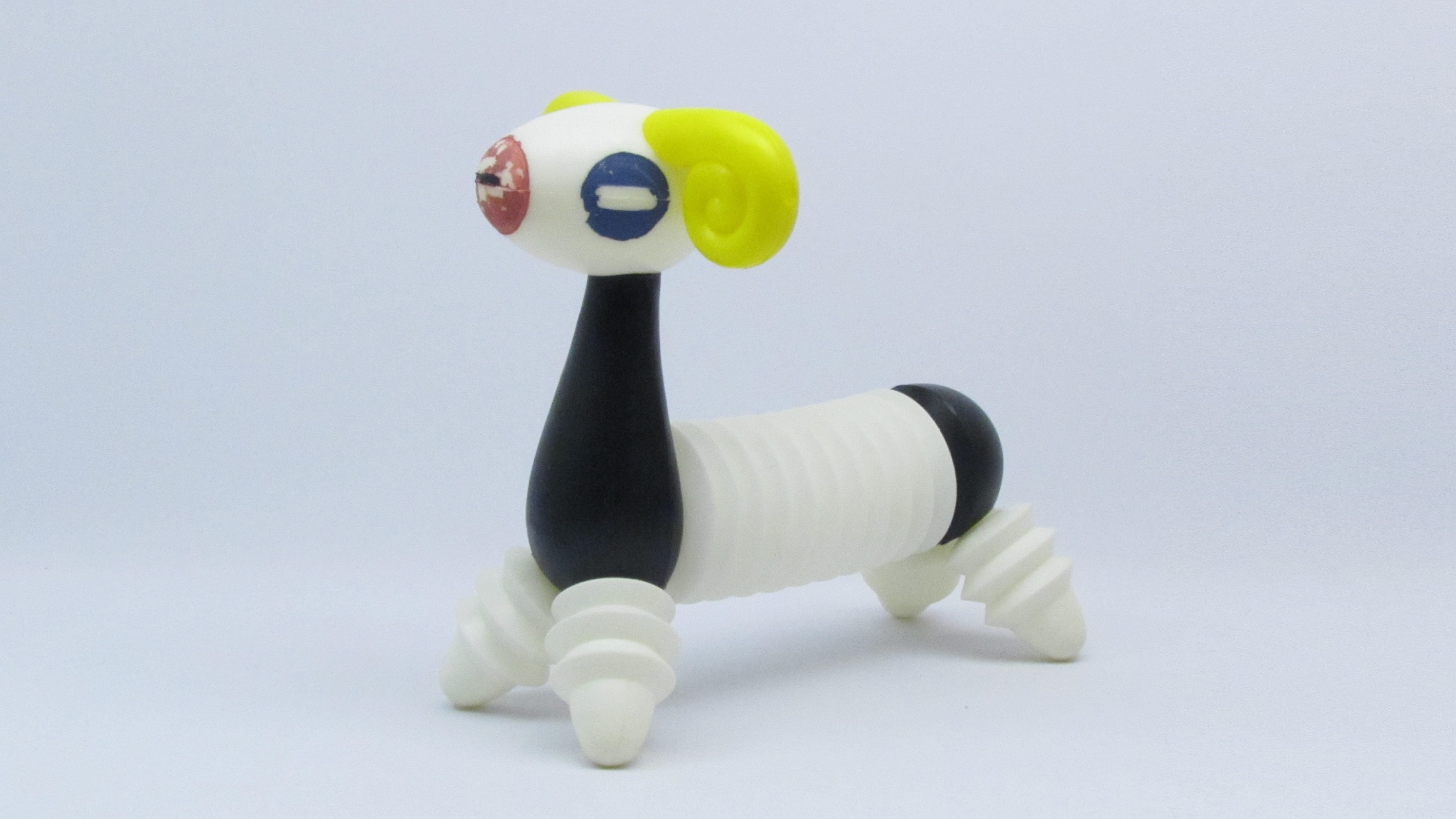
Ram, 1965

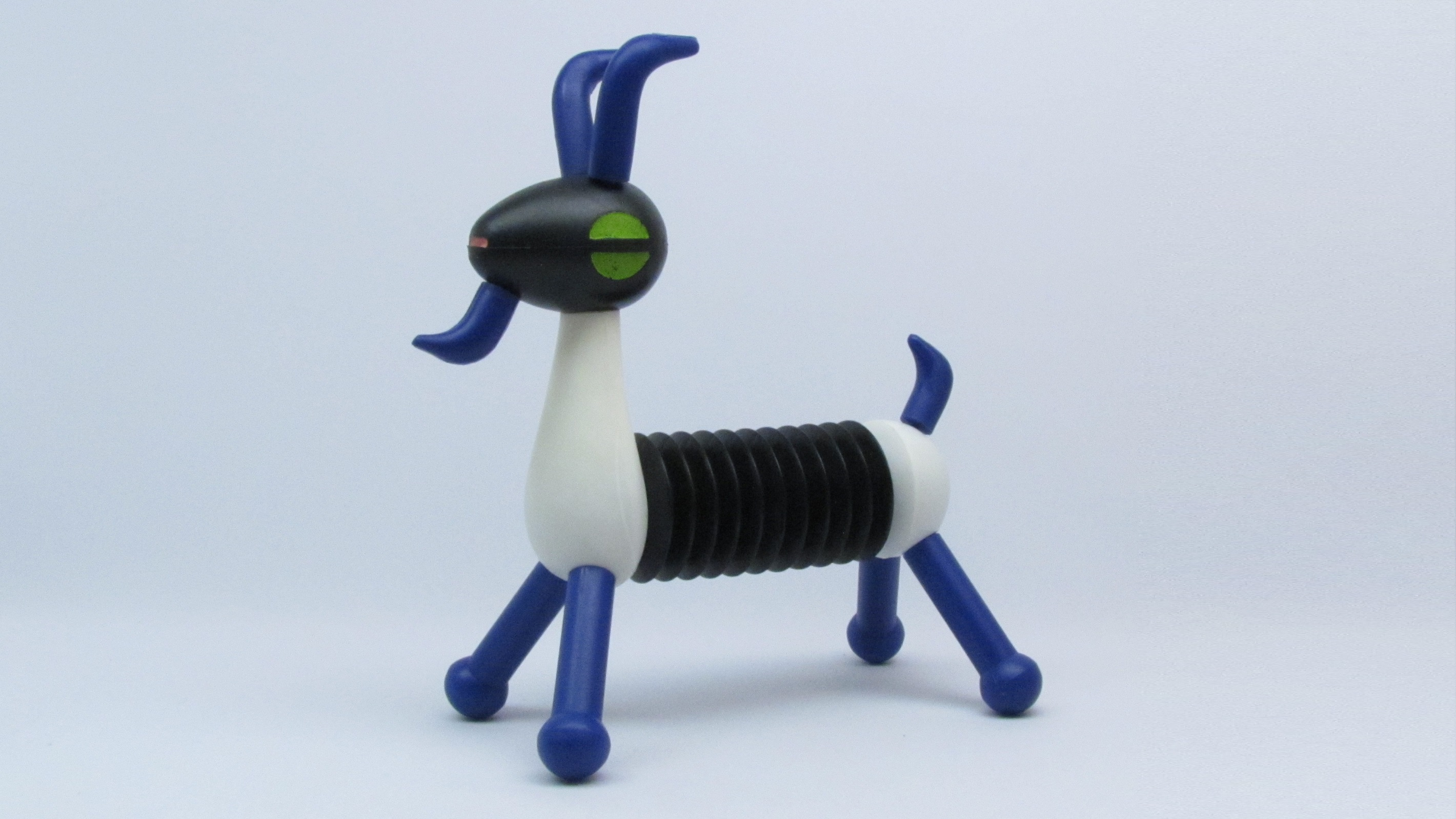
Goat, 1965

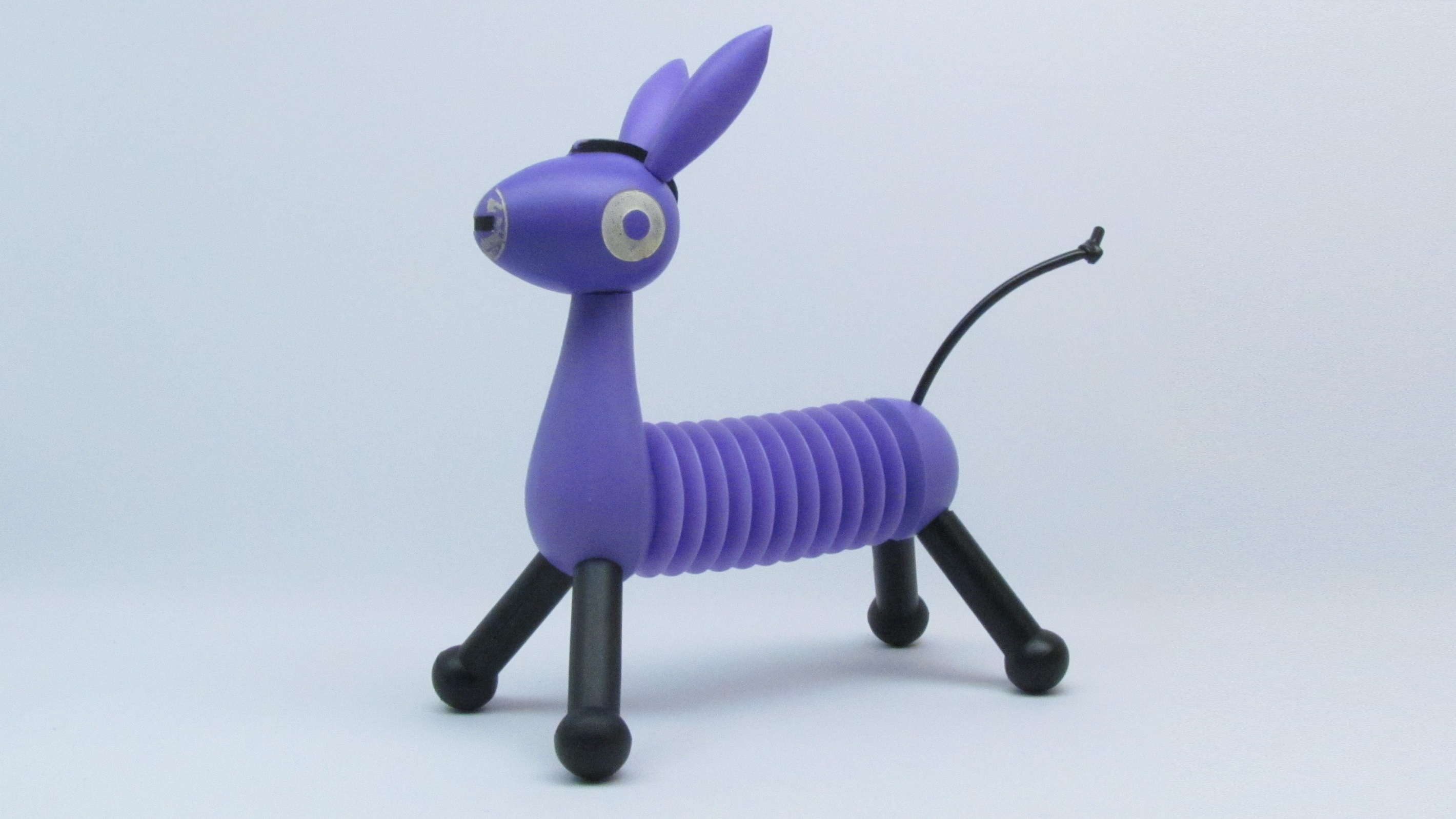
Donkey, 1965

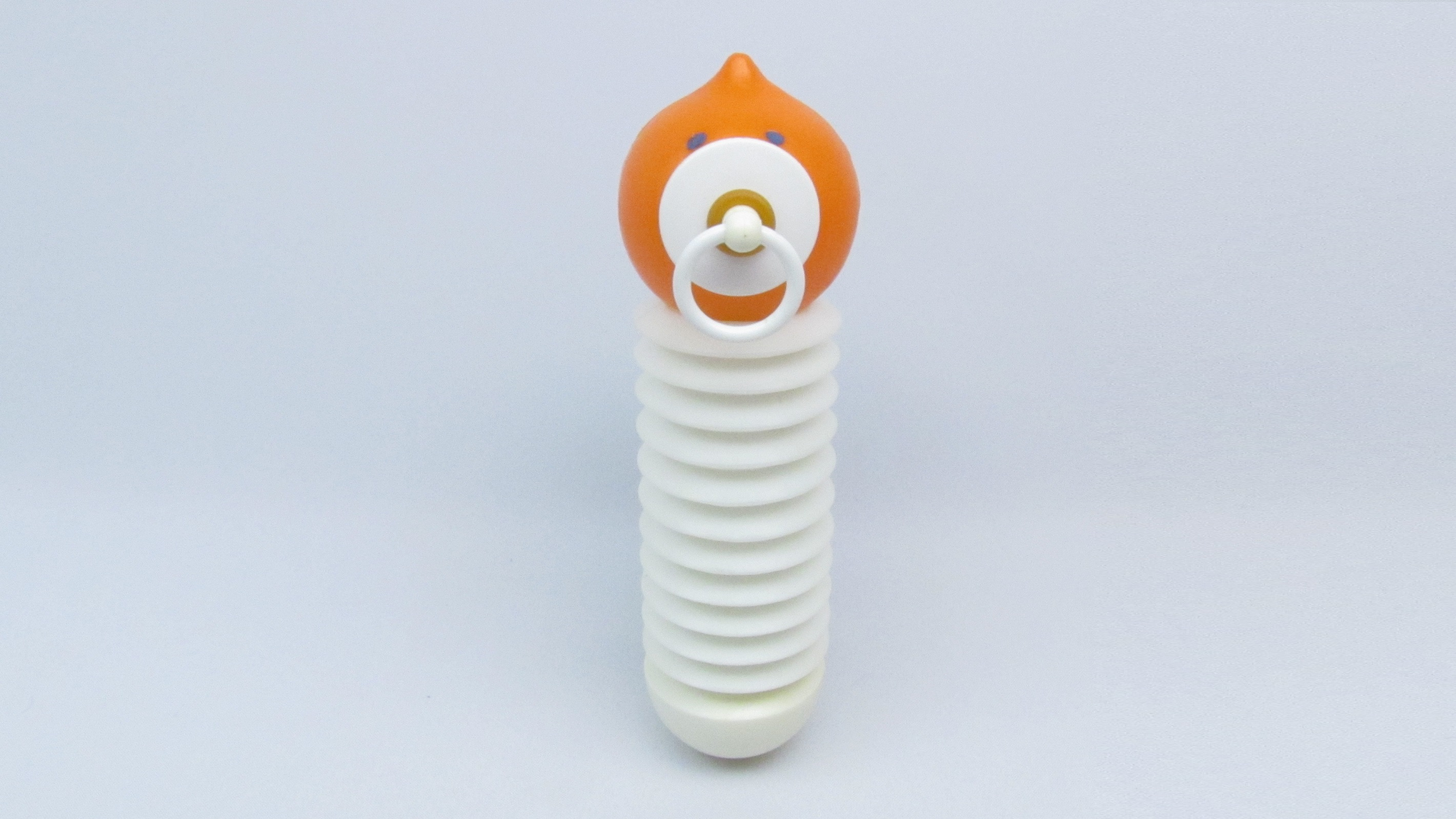
Baby, 1964

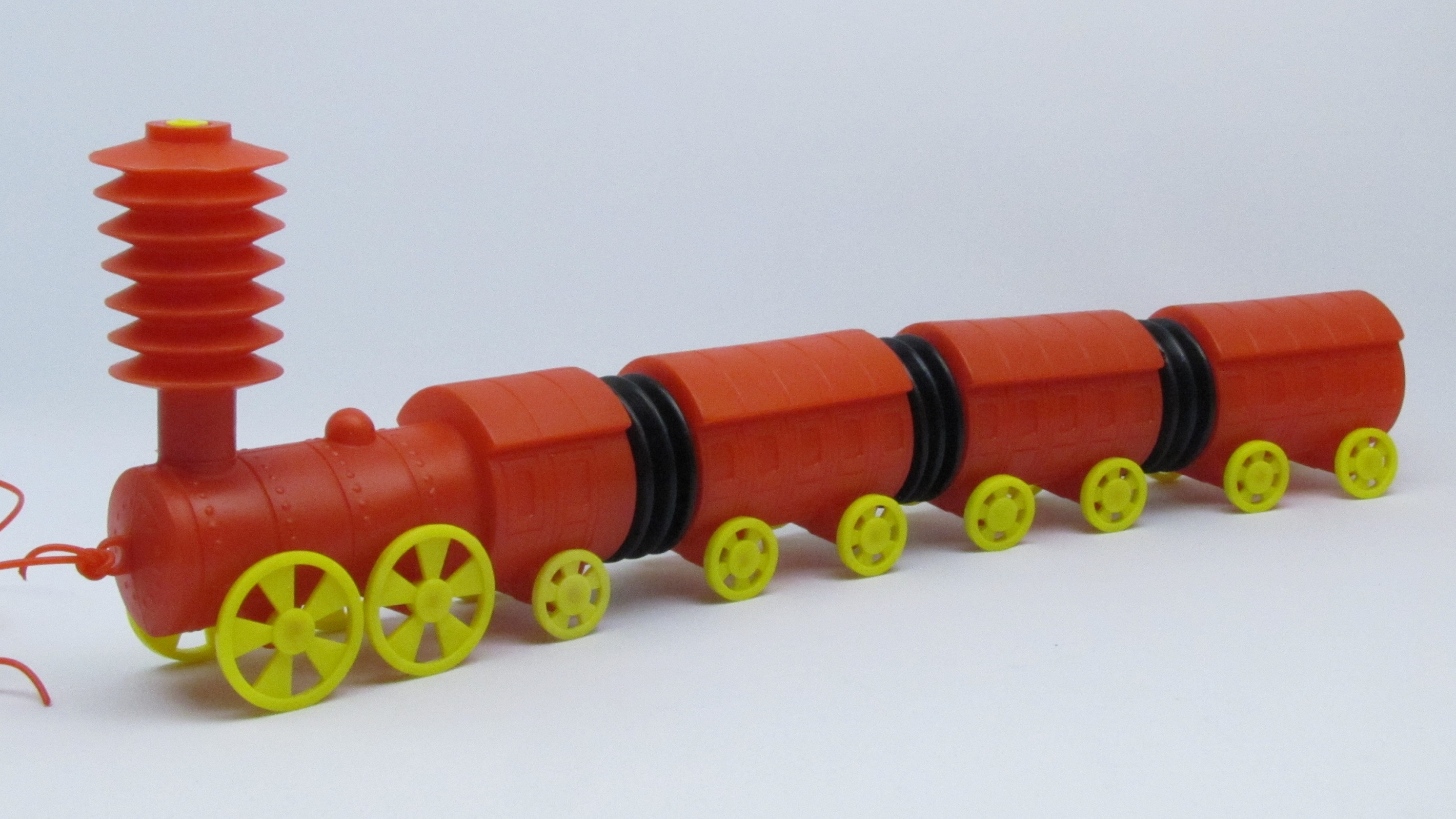
Toot-Toot the train, 1967

Vernian toys
for Fatra Napajedla, 1966

Niklová designed three toys based on characters from Jules Verne novels: Nautilus, Albatros, and Epouvante. These were designed for Expo 67 in Montreal, though they did not appear, as the Communist government deemed them to be "too Western". They eventually went into production, though Epouvante remained only as a prototype and was never mass-produced.

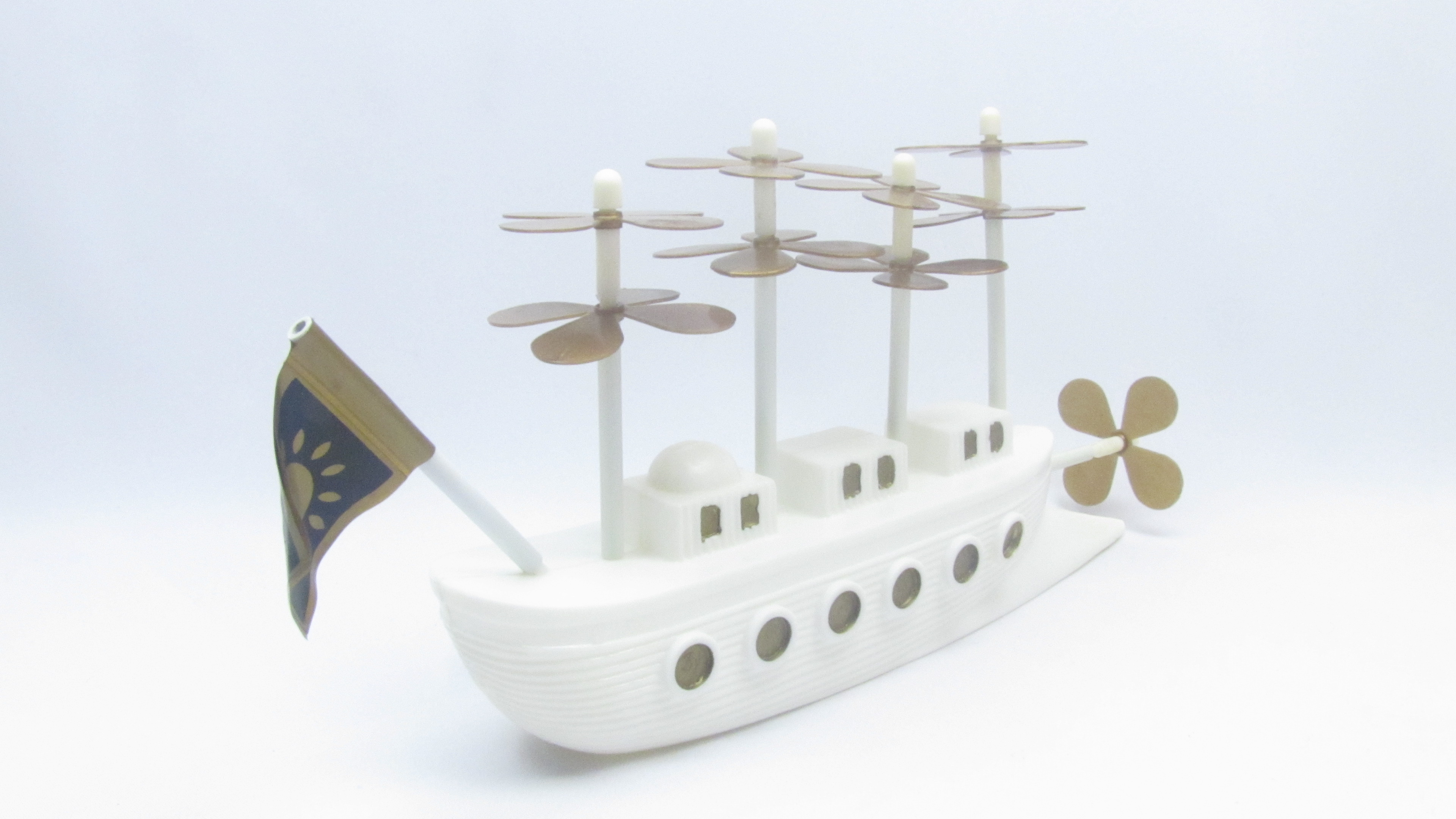
Albatros, 1967

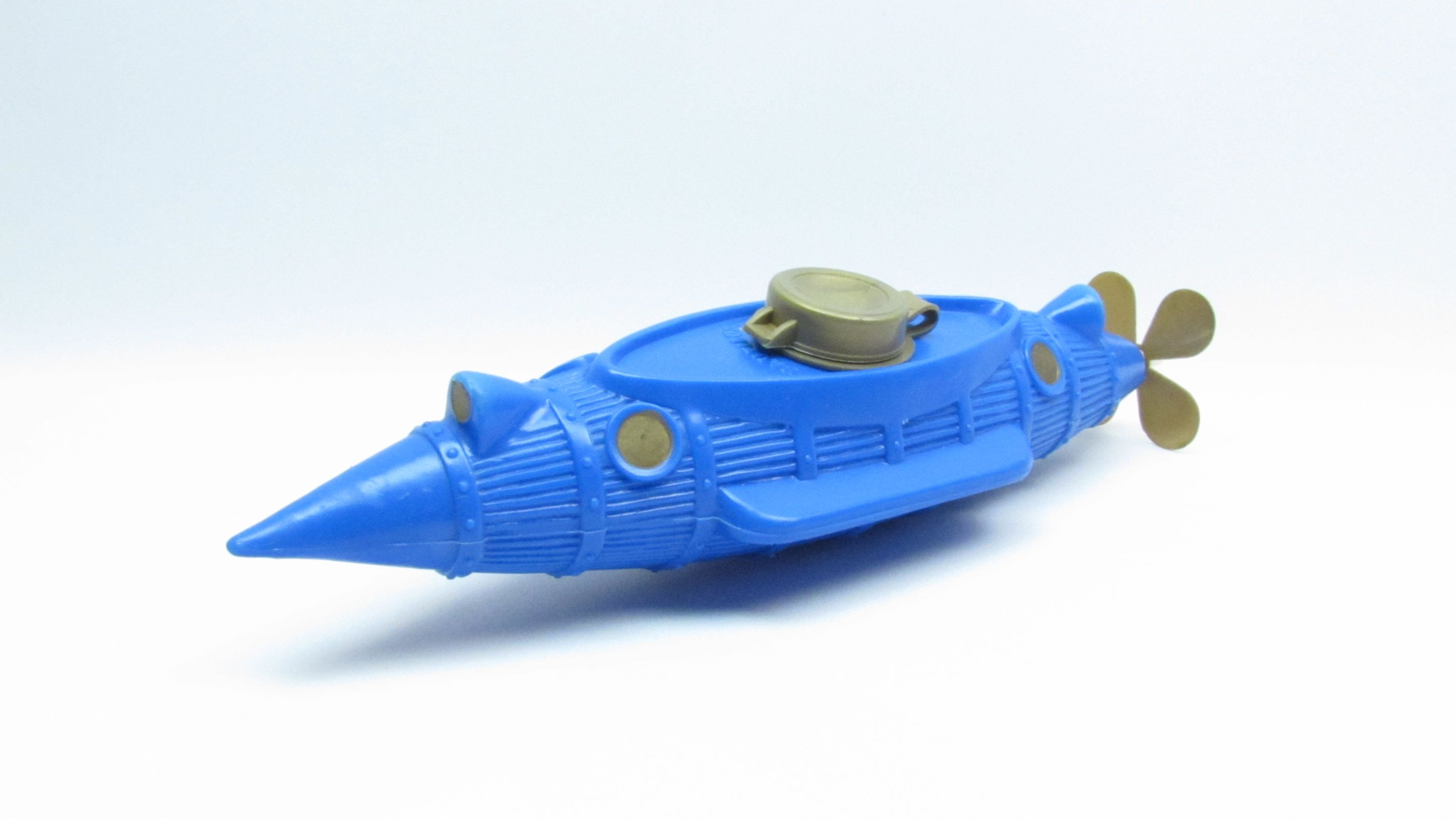
Nautilus, 1967

Inflatable toys
for Fatra Napajedla, 1963–1980

Niklová designed 140 inflatable toys. They were both for playing in water and on land, and some could also be used as children's furniture or for hopping on. She also designed boats, sunbeds, water circles, or pools. Some of these toys produced sound.

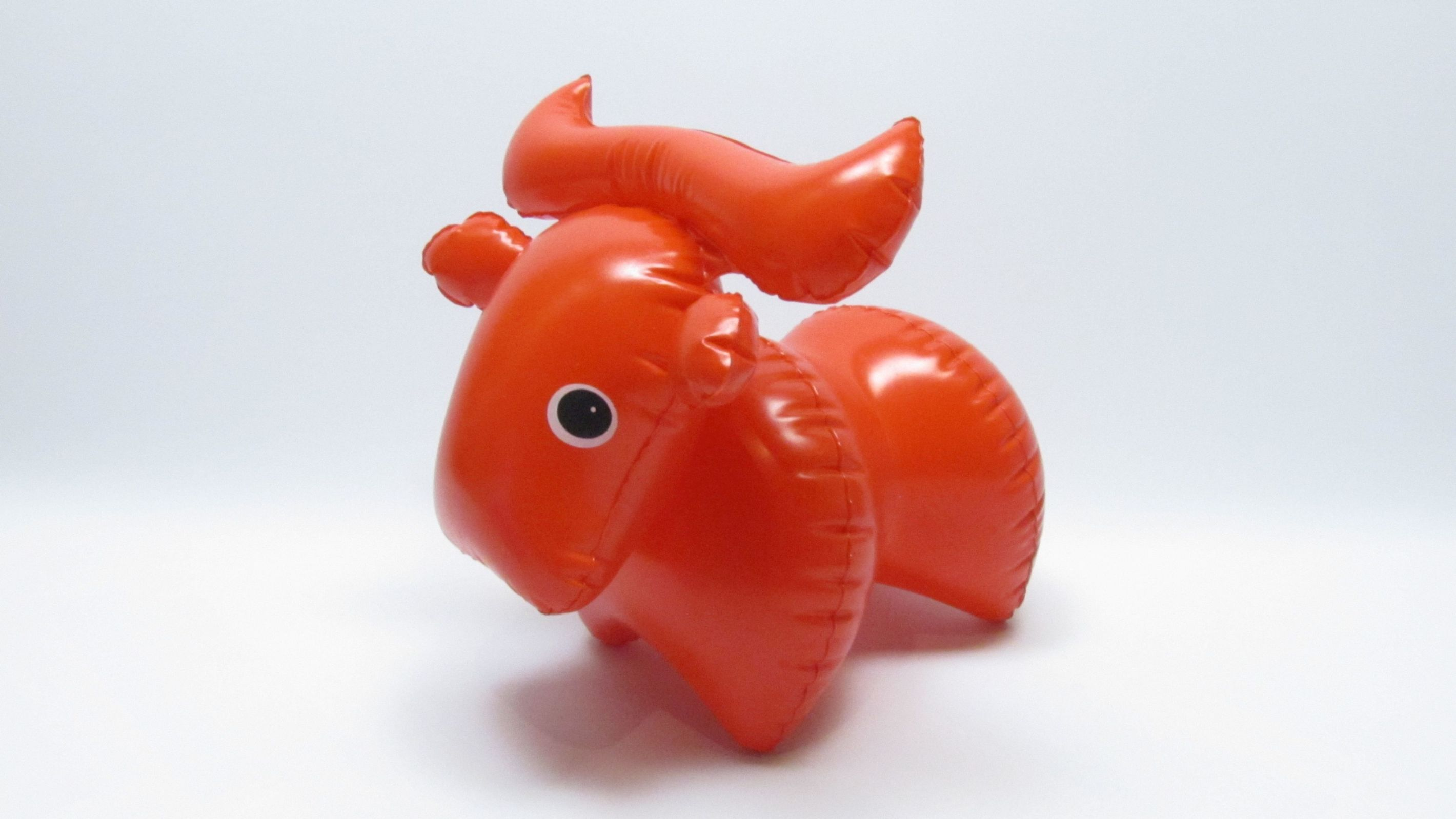
Buffalo (small), 1976

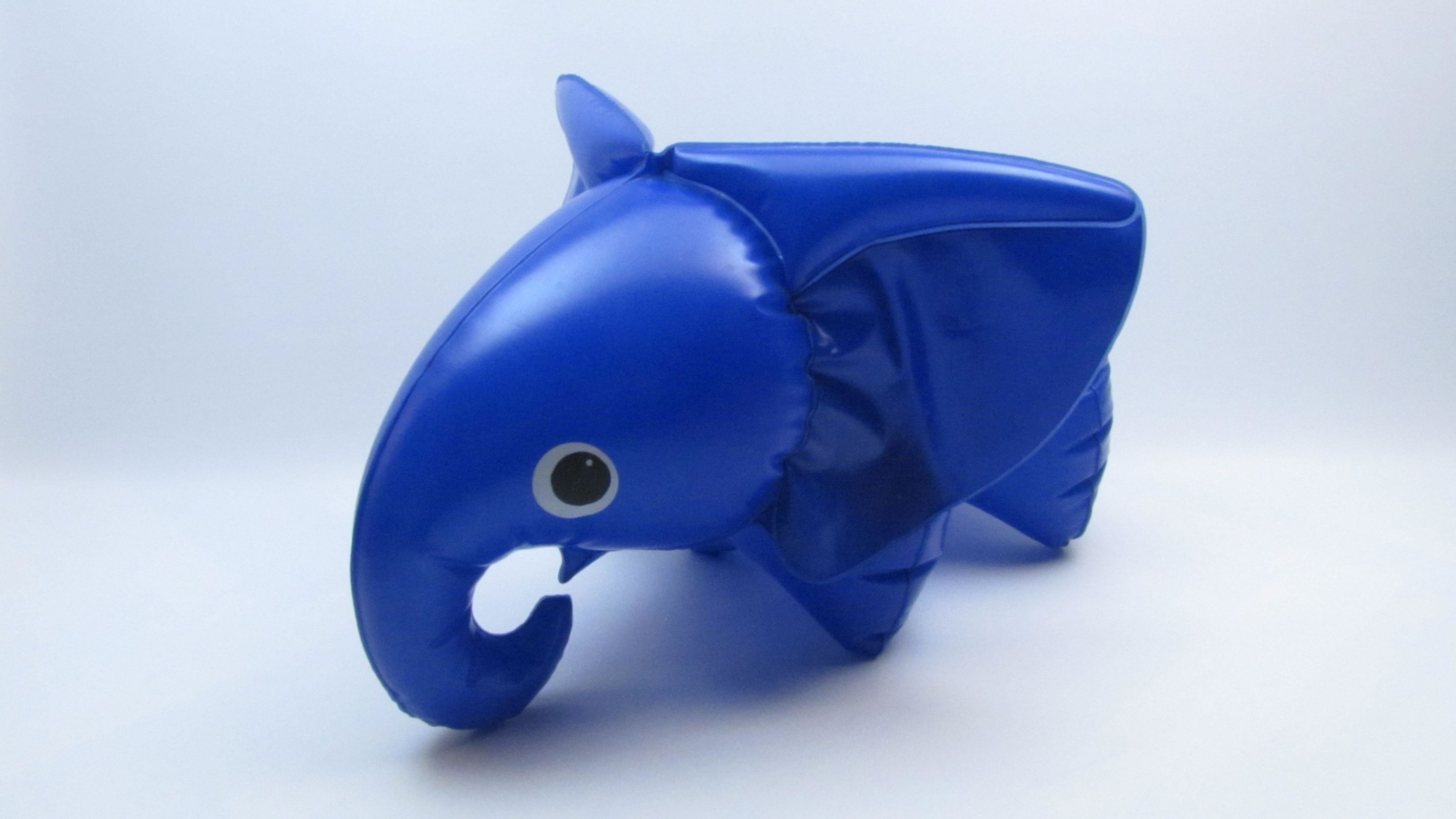
Elephant calf, 1975

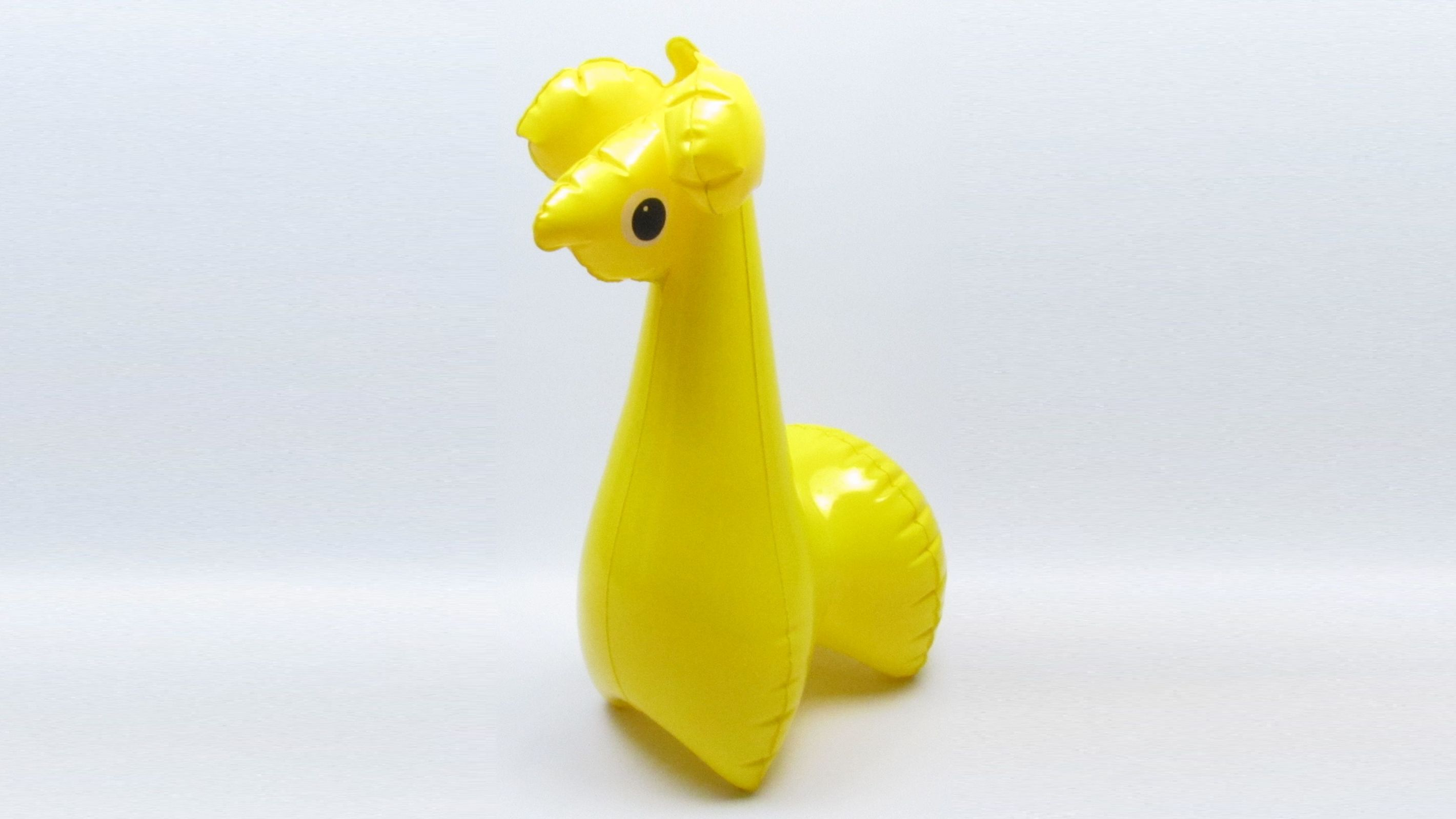
Giraffe (small), 1975

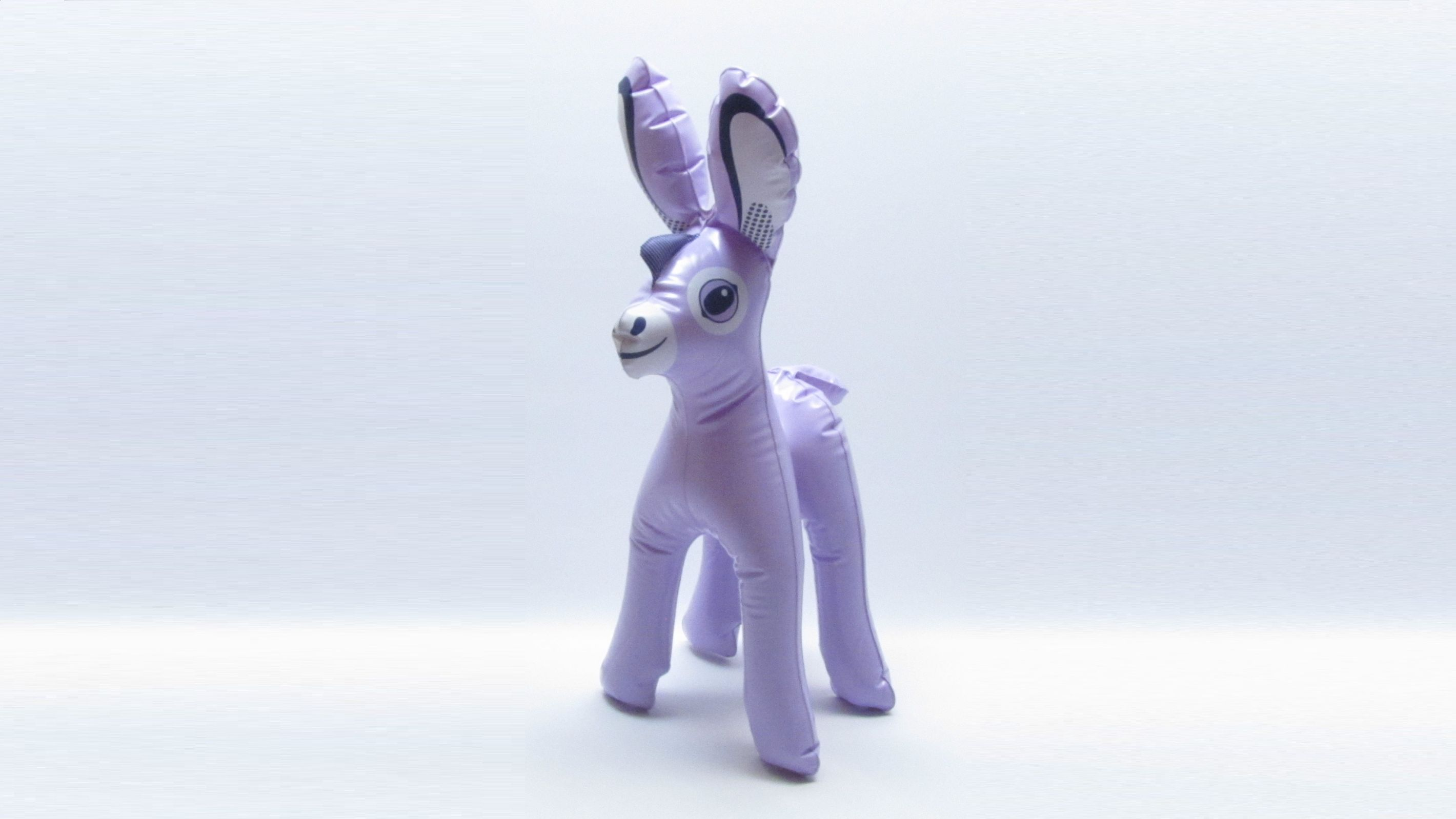
Donkey, 1975

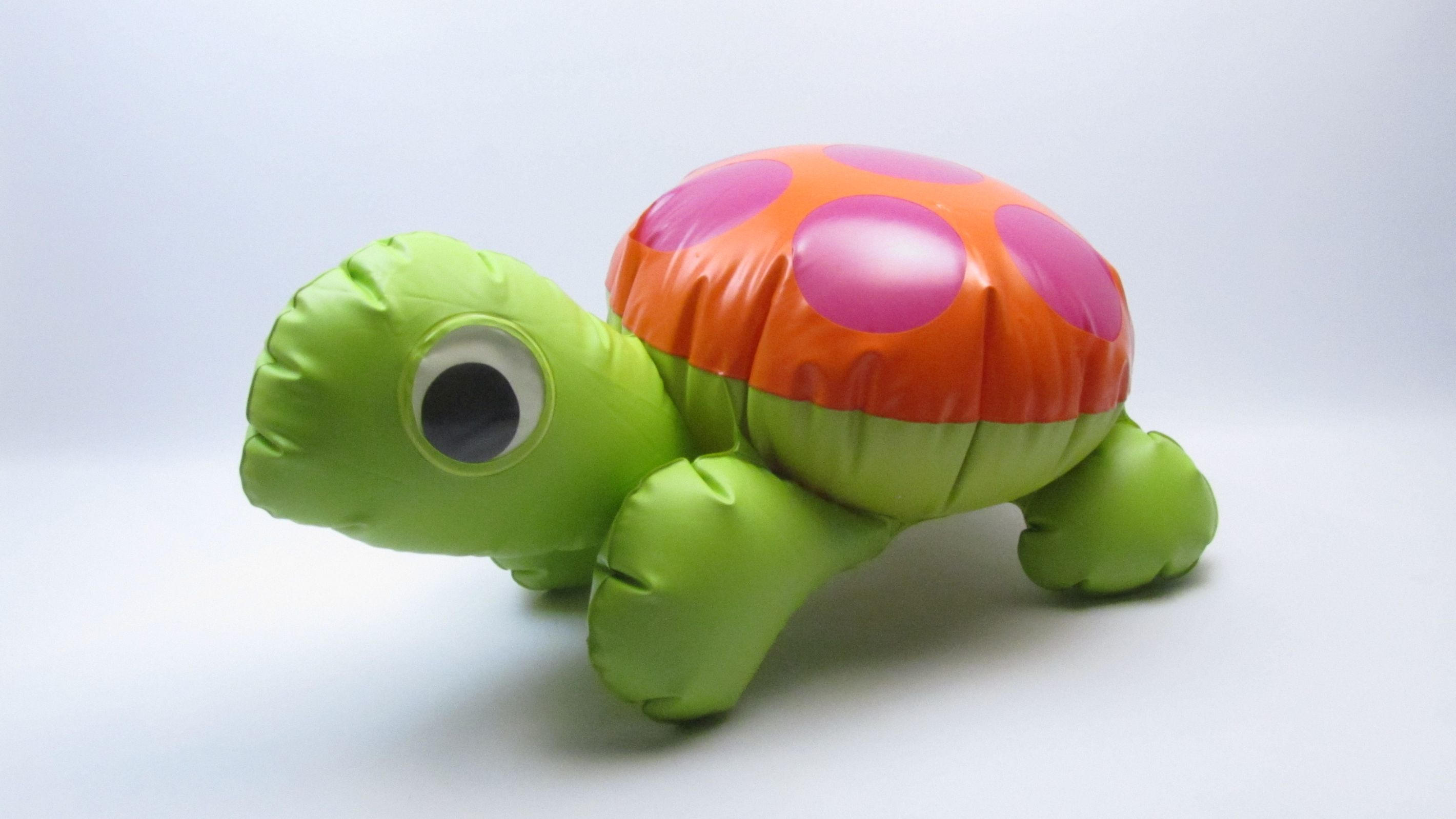
Little Turtle, 1977

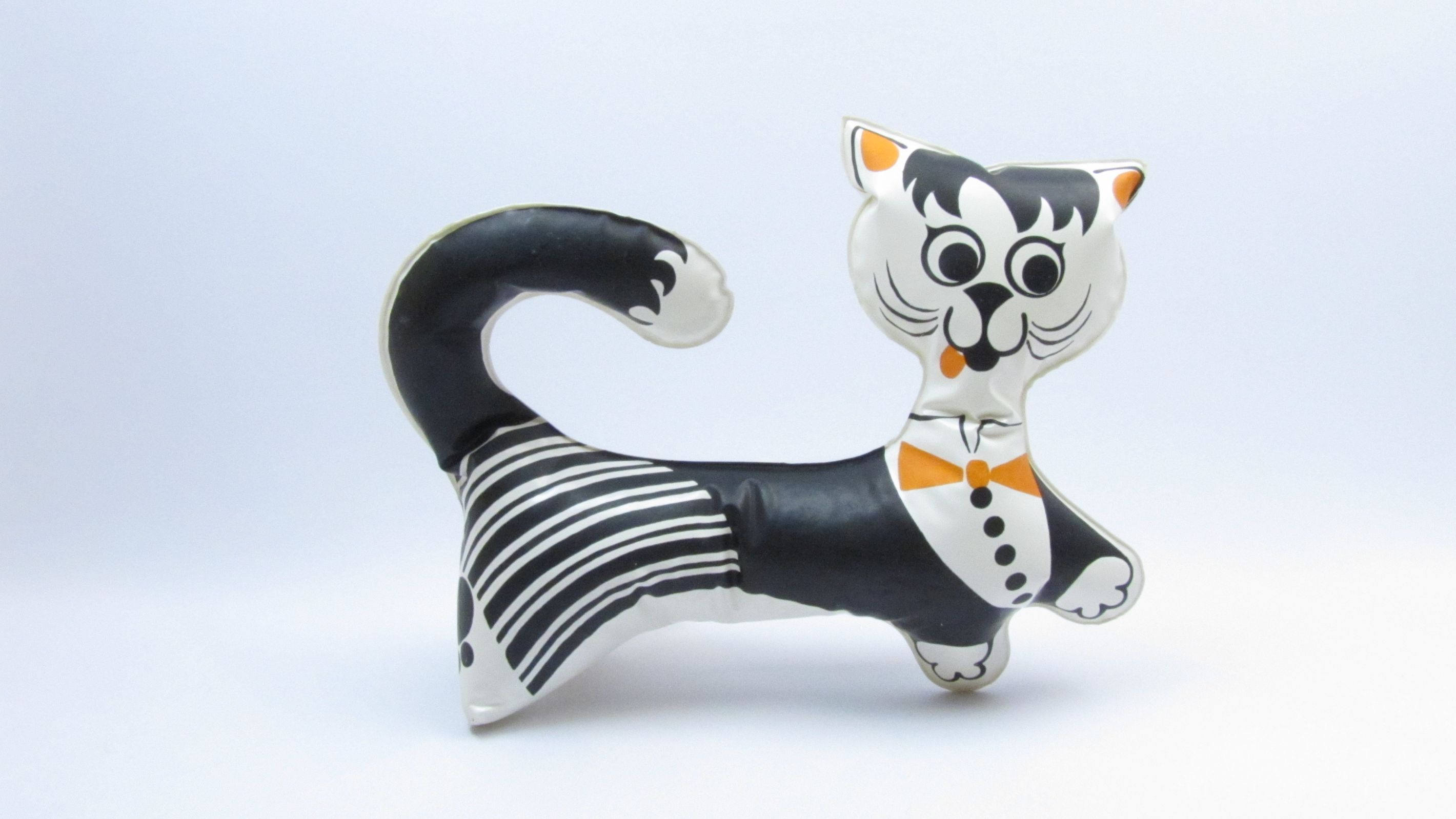
Blackie the Tomcat, 1967

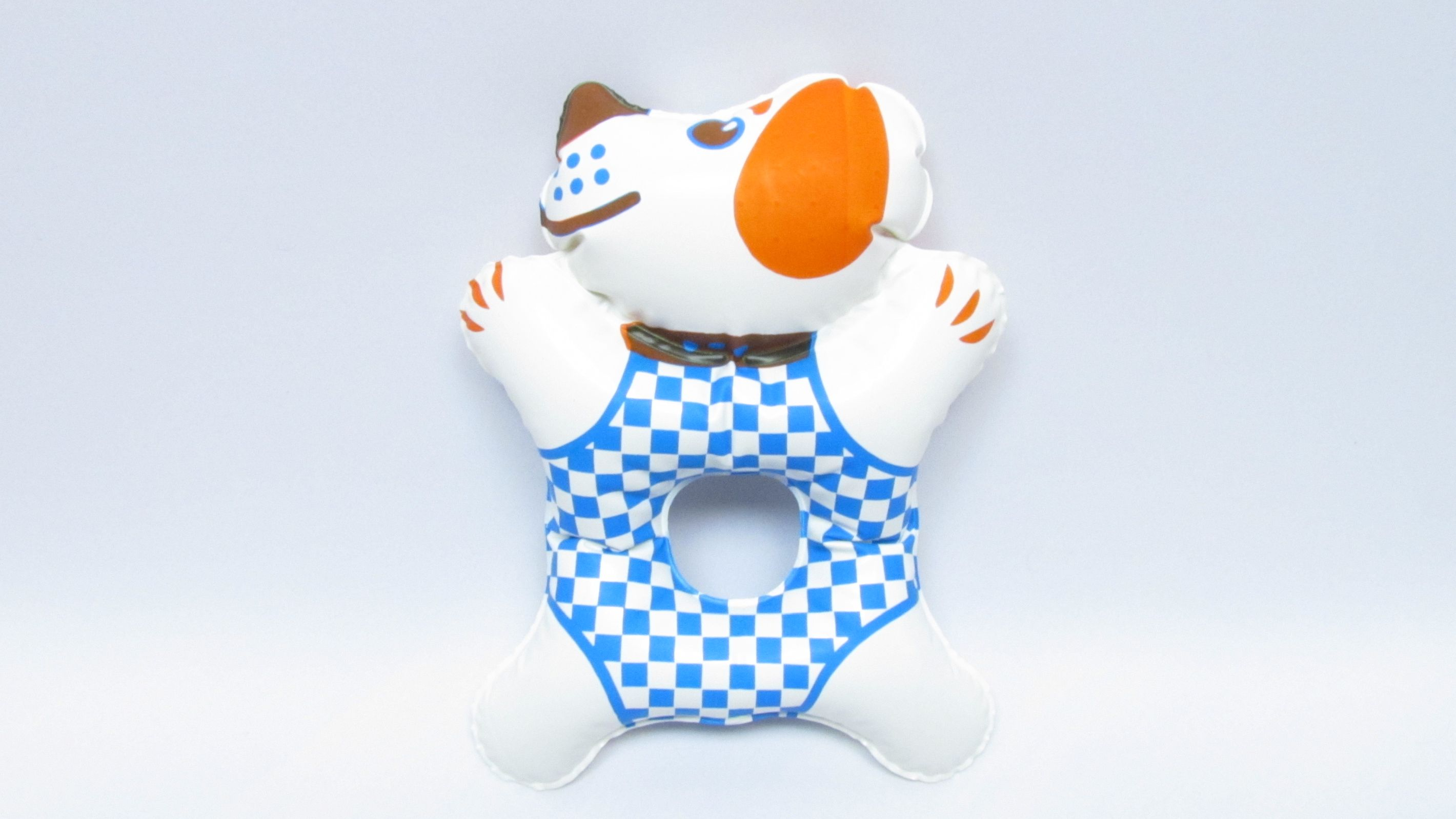
Doggie, 1974

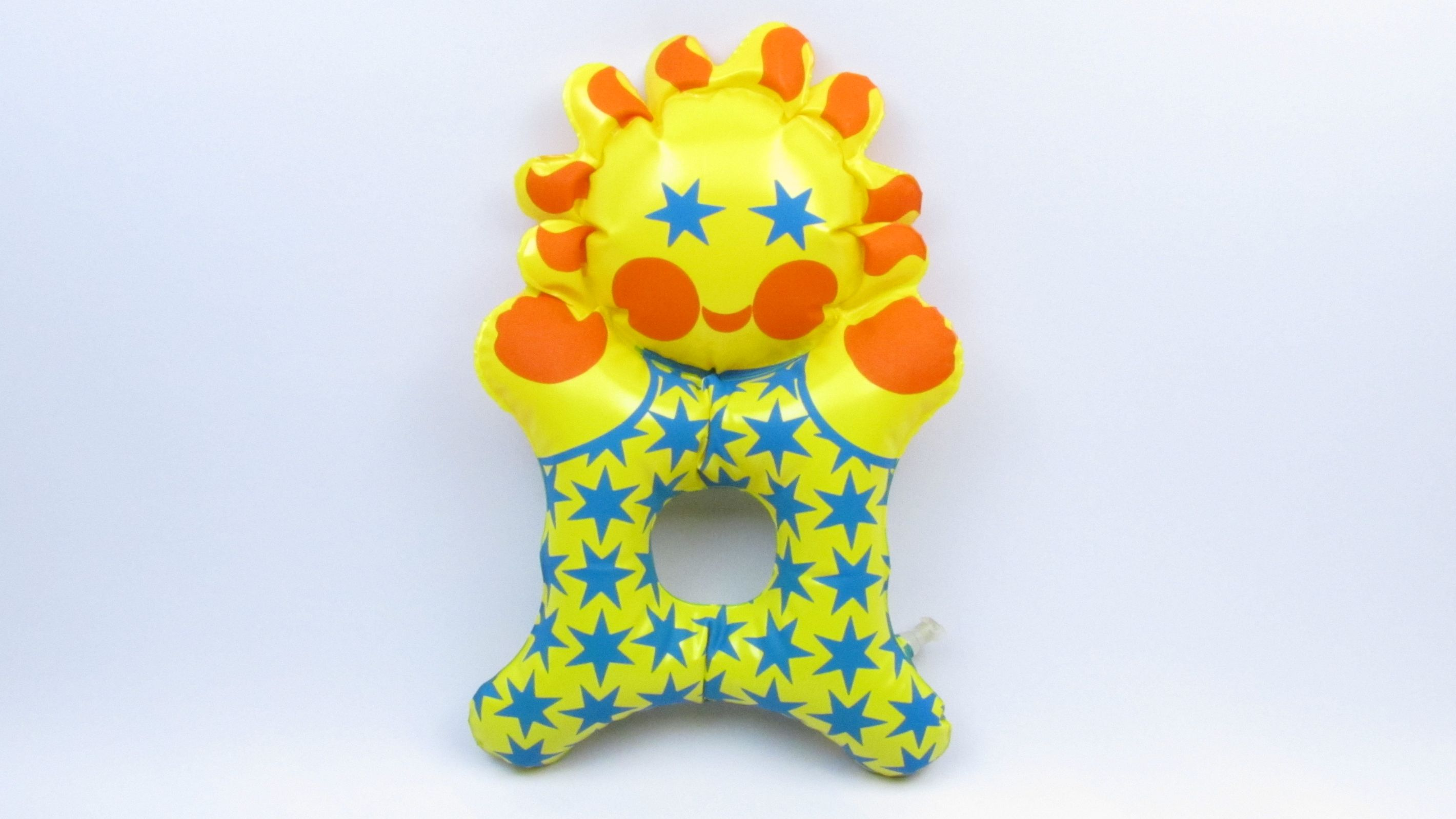
Little Sun, 1974

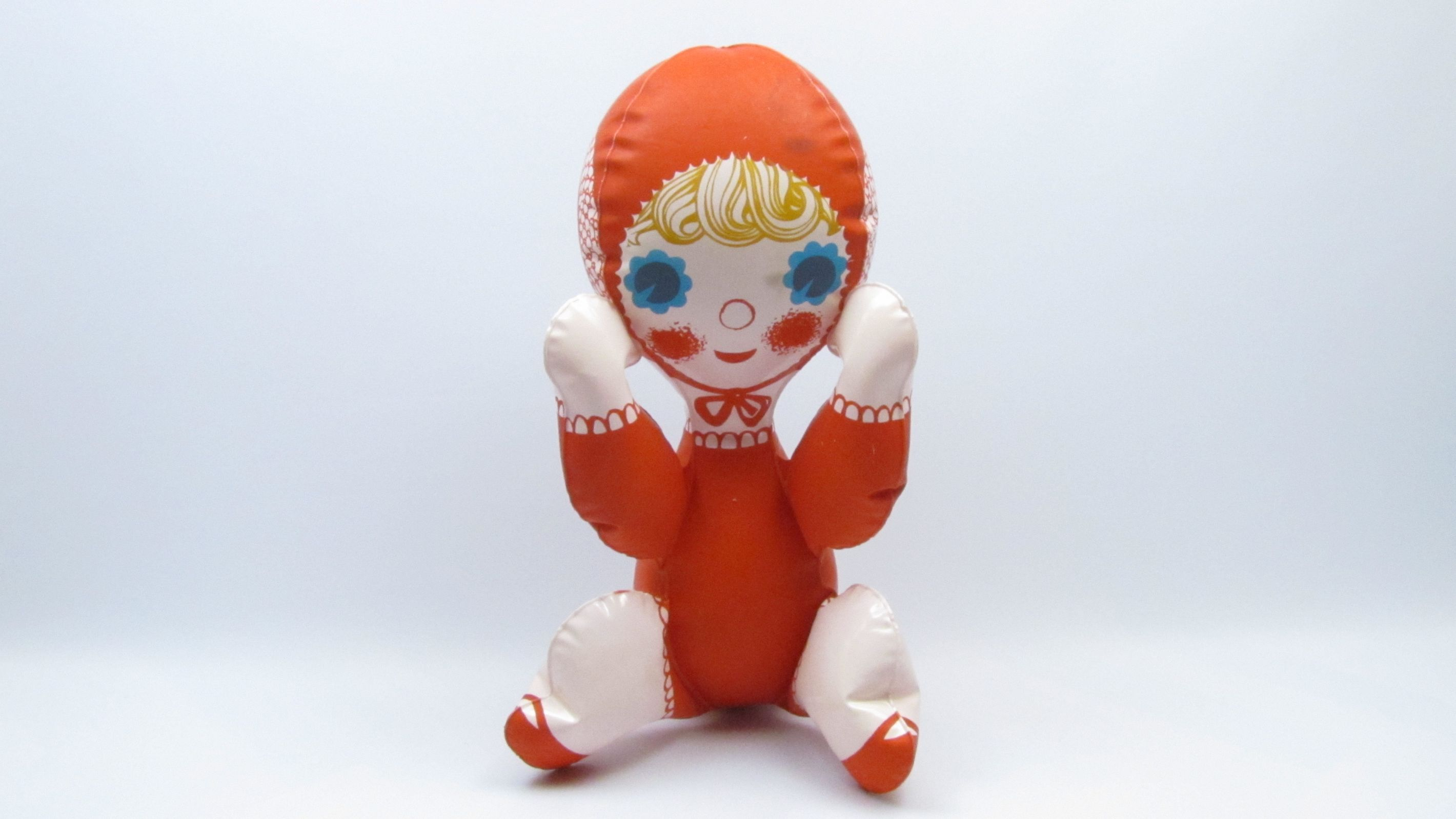
Little Red Riding Hood, 1969

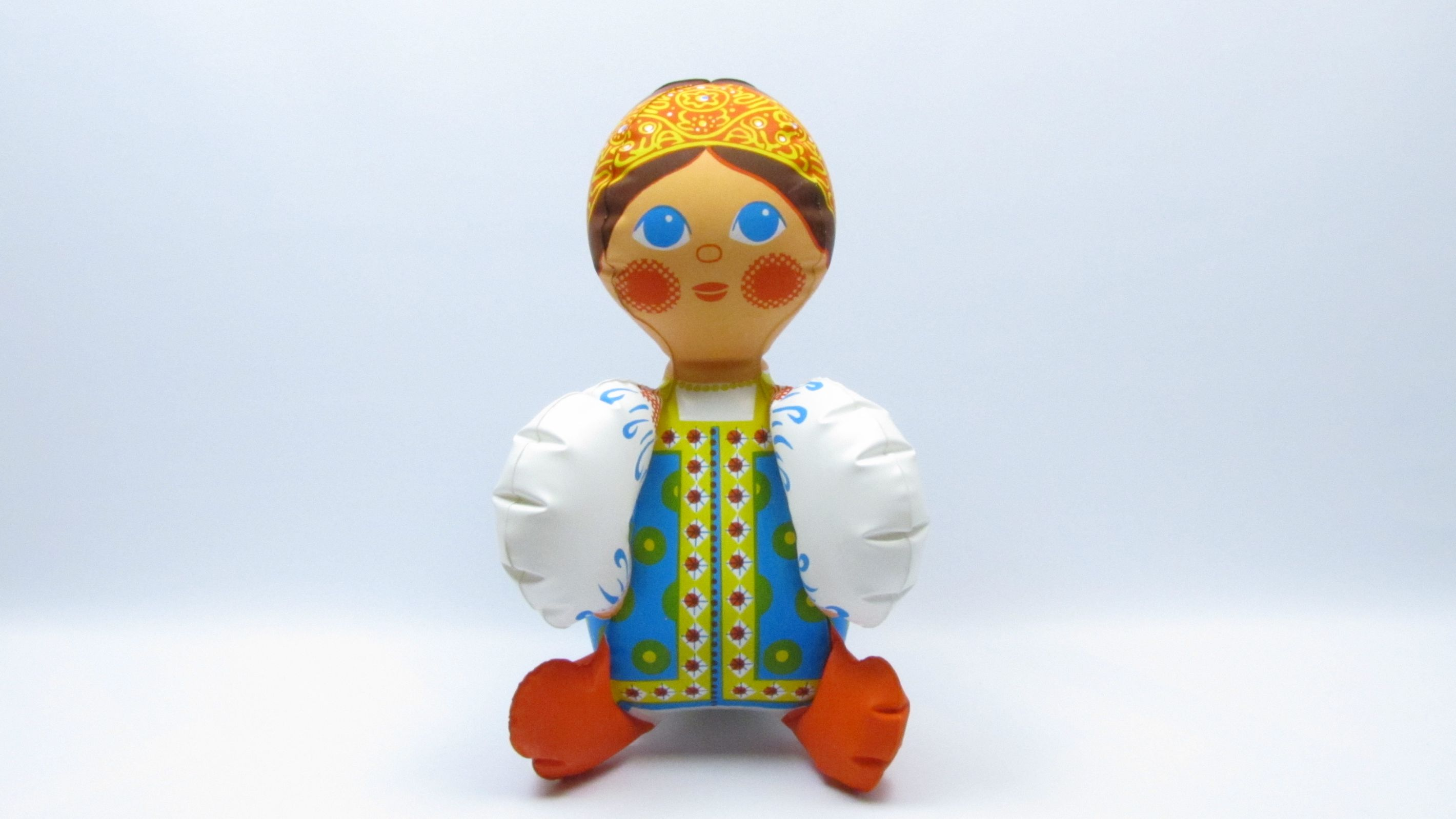
Masha, 1975

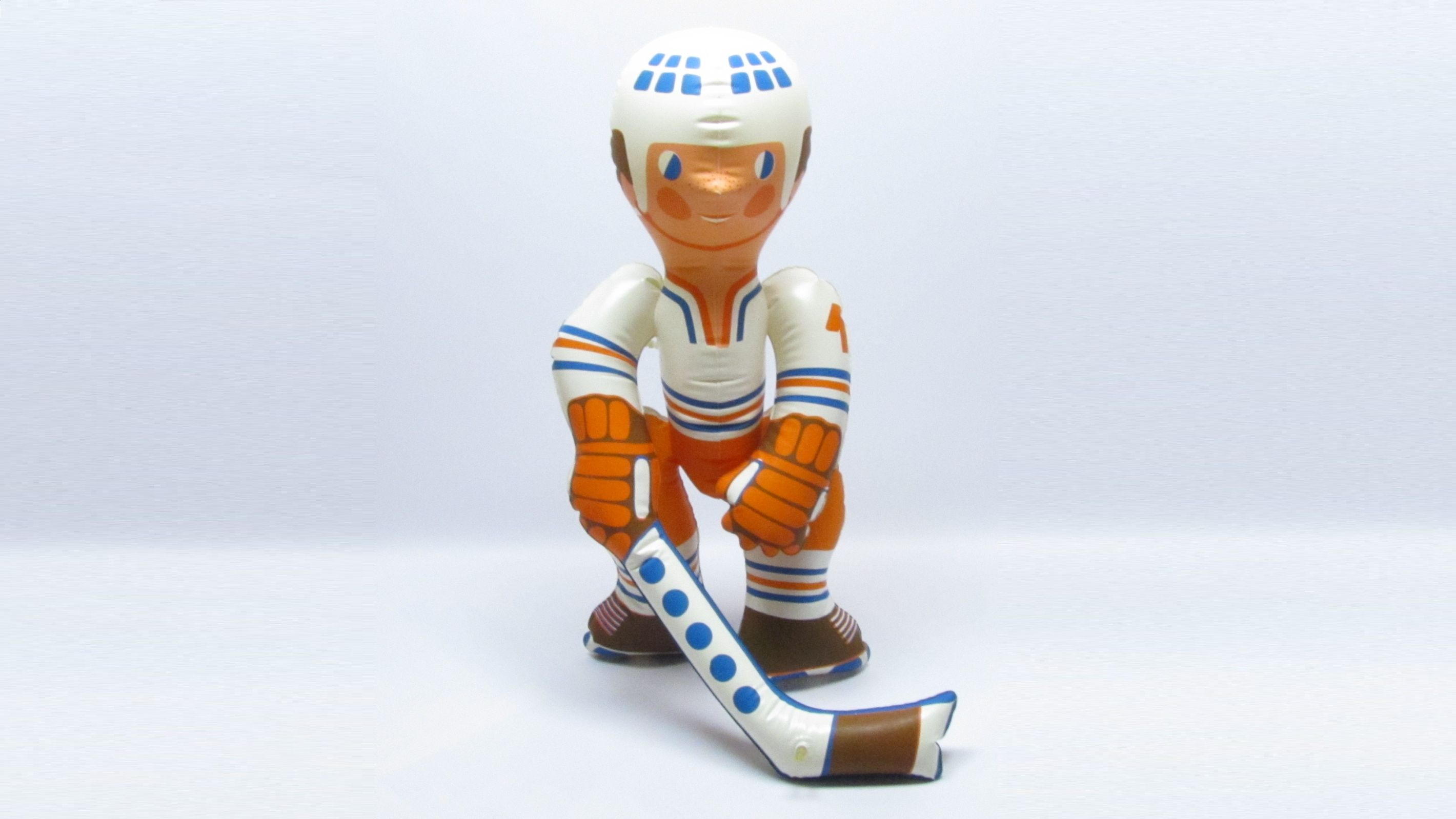
Ice hockey player, 1976

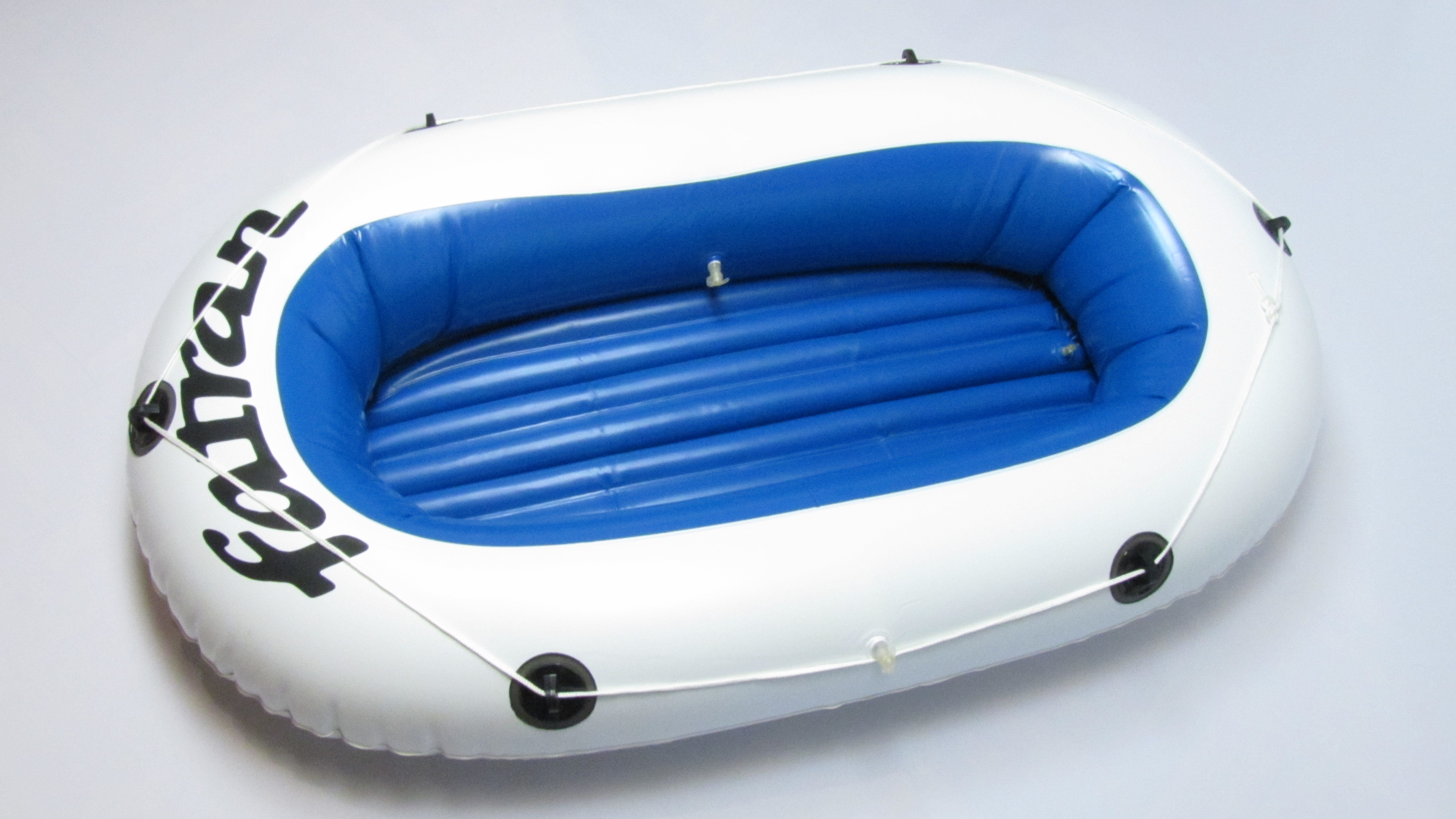
Fatran, 1969

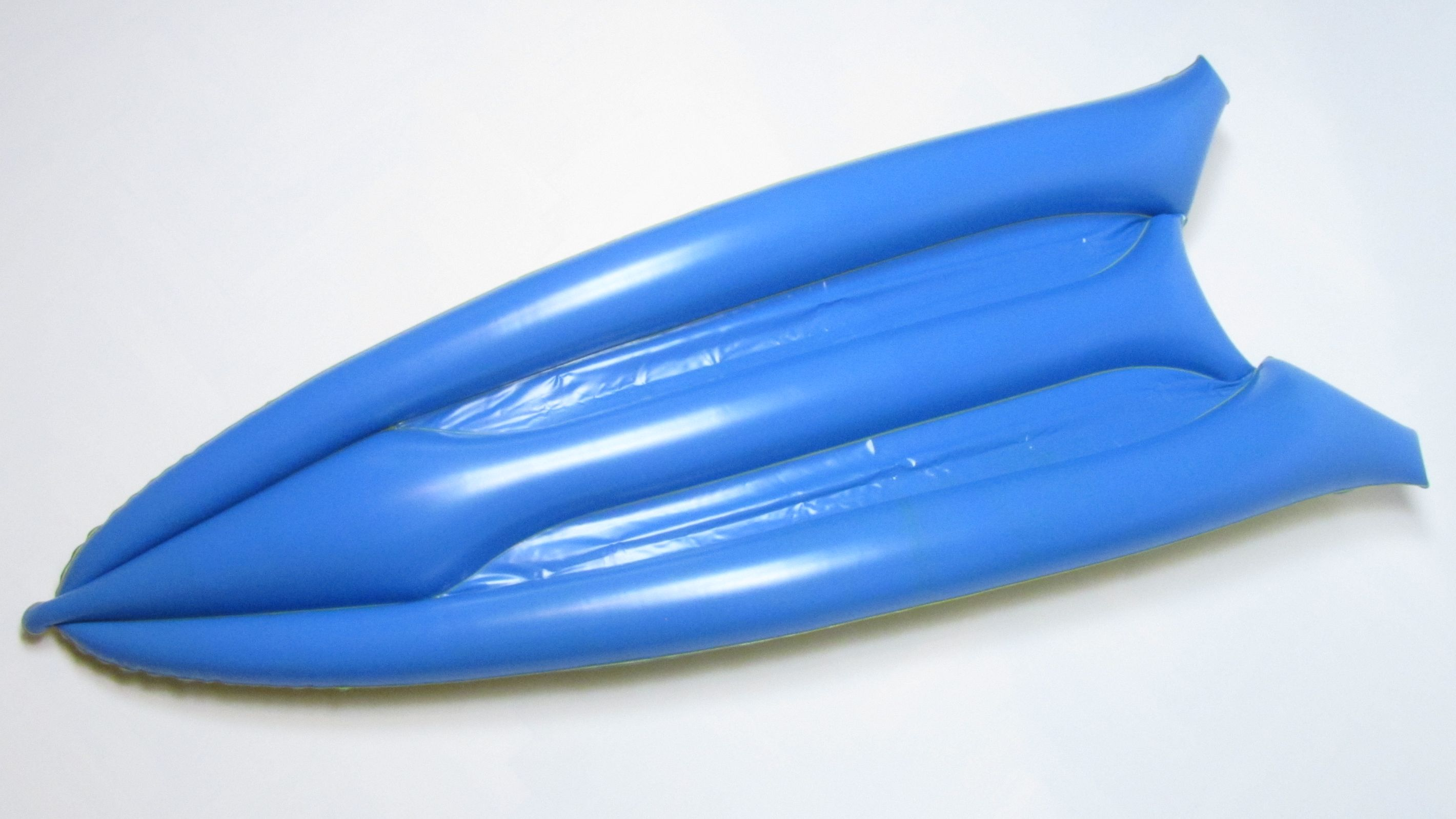
Arrow, 1974

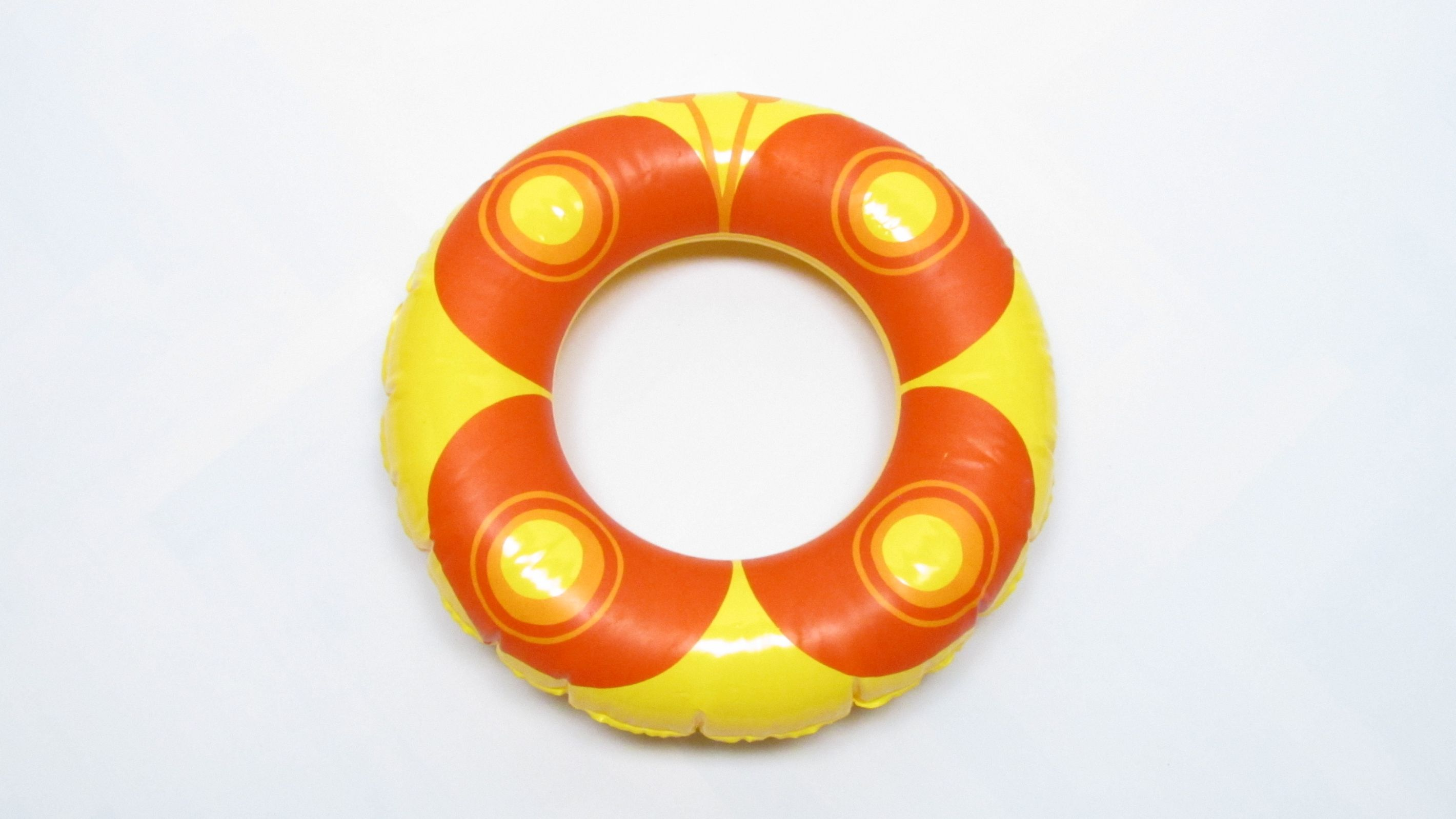
Butterfly decor, 1970

== Notable exhibitions ==
Niklová’s work has been featured in various exhibitions for over sixty years.

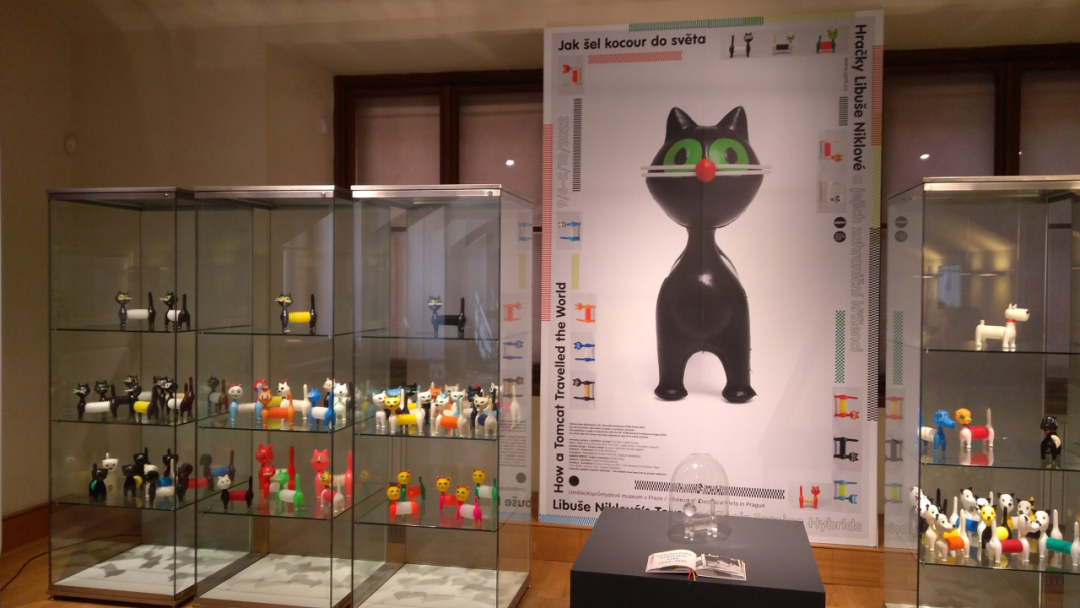
How a Tomcat Travelled the World: Libuše Niklová's Toys and Their Foreign Hybrids

- 200 dm3 dechu (200 dm3 of breath) – the Regional Gallery of Fine Arts in Zlín, House of Arts in Zlín, Czechia (2010)
- 200 dm3 dechu (200 dm3 of breath) – the Museum of Decorative Arts in Prague, Czechia (2010)
- Plastique ludique – the Musée des Arts Décoratifs at the Louvre, Paris, France (2011)
- Paris et Création – Plastique ludique – the Galeries Lafayette in Paris, France (2011)
- Century of the Child: Growing by Design, 1900–2000 – the Museum of Modern Art in New York, US (2012)
- Designing Modern Women 1890–1990 – the Museum of Modern Art in New York, US 2013–2014
- 100 Years of Czech Design – the Okazaki Mindscape Museum, Okazaki City Museum of Art (Aichi) in Okazaki, Japan (2019)
- 100 Years of Czech Design – the Toyama Prefectural Museum of Art and Design in Toyama, Japan (2019)
- 100 Years of Czech Design – the Setagaya Art Museum in Tokyo, Japan (2019)
- 100 Years of Czech Design – the Museum of Modern Art, Kamakura & Hayama in Hayama, Japan (2020)
- 100 Years of Czech Design – the National Museum of Modern Art in Kyoto, Japan (2020)
- How a Tomcat Travelled the World: Libuše Niklová's Toys and Their Foreign Hybrids – the Museum of Decorative Arts in Prague, Czechia
