= List of American Championship Car racetracks =

This is a list of tracks which have hosted a national Championship Car race event. From 1905 until 1955, the AAA organized the national championship. In 1956, the USAC took over this role. In 1979, several teams split off from USAC and founded CART. Between 1979 and 1983, both championships were contested in parallel—partly on the same racetracks, and occasionally even through joint events.

In 1996, the organizers of the Indianapolis 500 broke away from CART and founded the Indy Racing League, which continues today under the name IndyCar Series. Between 1996 and 2003, CART and the IRL shared several racetracks in parallel, while also holding many of their own separate events. In 2003, CART was dissolved and replaced by the Champ Car World Series, which in turn was absorbed into the IndyCar Series in 2008.

This list encompasses all race tracks where races sanctioned by these bodies have been held, covering the period from 1905 to the present day.

Various forms of race track have been used throughout the history of IndyCar, including purpose‑built facilities such as the Indianapolis Motor Speedway, hill climb courses such as the Pikes Peak International Hill Climb, and temporary circuits such as the Cleveland Burke Lakefront Airport.

== Regular closed course race tracks ==
The following tables list all of the tracks previously used by USAC, CART or IndyCar at least two times. The categorization based on contemporary use by championship car series, not on modern technical comparability. Oval tracks are classified according to definitions common in North America, which are also used in the IndyCar environment. A distinction is made between short ovals, so-called intermediate ovals, and superspeedways. The IndyCar Series itself makes a fundamental distinction only between short ovals, superspeedways, permanent road courses and temporary street circuits. A new row is added only when the track length, surface type, or fundamental layout (including number of corners, position of start/finish line, or pit lane configuration) changed. Minor modifications such as revised run-off areas or kerb adjustments are not reflected, as contemporary sources do not provide sufficient data to distinguish such changes reliably.

=== Key to tables ===
- Track: Name of the track. Either the current name of the track (as it exists today) or the last known name of the track is shown.
- Type and Length: Approximate course length (in miles), shape, and surface type. For course length, the last known measurement provided by Indycar is shown. Note that this figure may differ in various sources depending on the method that Indycar or other sanctioning bodies have used to measure the track.
- Location: The state (or province, for Canadian tracks) and city (or nearest city) where each track is located.
- Season(s): Seasons in which the track hosted an event.
- Notes: Any additional information or clarification that may be useful. This includes details on the track's current status, or whether the track saw further use in other series.
- Permanently closed or demolished tracks are marked with grey background.

=== Superspeedways ===
| Track | Type and Length | Location | Map | Season(s) | Notes |
|---|---|---|---|---|---|
| California Speedway (CAL) (formerly Auto Club Speedway, ACS) | 2.029-mile (3.265 km) paved oval | Fontana, California; 34°5′19″N 117°30′0″W | | 1997–2003 (CART) | In 2025, large parts of the superspeedway have been removed. The construction of the proposed new short track has not started as of May 2026. |
| California Speedway (CAL) (formerly Auto Club Speedway, ACS) | 2.000-mile (3.219 km) paved oval | Fontana, California; 34°5′19″N 117°30′0″W | | 2002 (IRL); 2003–2005, 2012–2015 (ICS) | In 2025, large parts of the superspeedway have been removed. The construction of the proposed new short track has not started as of May 2026. |
| EuroSpeedway Lausitz (LAU) | 2.023-mile (3.256 km) paved oval | Klettwitz, Germany; 51°32′0″N 13°55′10″E | | 2001, 2003 (CART) | The oval track is no longer used due to insufficient safety standards; the infield road course is still used by the DTM. |
| Indianapolis Motor Speedway (IMS) | 2.500-mile (4.023 km) brick-oval | Speedway, Indiana; 39°47′54″N 86°13′58″W | | 1909–1916 (AAA); 1919–1941 (AAA); 1946–1955 (AAA); 1956–1960 (USAC) | Brick surface gradually replaced by asphalt between 1936 and 1961; the 1961 race was the first held on the fully asphalted track, retaining only a one-yard-wide strip of bricks at the start-finish line |
| Indianapolis Motor Speedway (IMS) | 2.500-mile (4.023 km) paved oval | Speedway, Indiana; 39°47′54″N 86°13′58″W | | 1961–1978 (USAC); 1979–1980 (USAC/CART); 1981–1982 (USAC); 1983–1995 (USAC/CART); 1996–2002 (IRL); 2003–2026 (ICS) | Brick surface gradually replaced by asphalt between 1936 and 1961; the 1961 race was the first held on the fully asphalted track, retaining only a one-yard-wide strip of bricks at the start-finish line |
| Michigan International Speedway (MIS) | 2.000-mile (3.219 km) paved oval | Brooklyn, Michigan; 42°03′59″N 84°14′29″W | | 1968–1978 (USAC); 1979–2001 (CART); 2002 (IRL); 2003–2007 (ICS) | |
| Ontario Motor Speedway (ONT) | 2.500-mile (4.023 km) paved oval | Ontario, California; 34°4′20″N 117°34′2″W | | 1970–1978 (USAC); 1979–1980 (CART) | Closed in 1980; demolished in 1981; now the site of Toyota Arena. |
| Pocono Raceway (POC) | 2.500-mile (4.023 km) paved oval | Long Pond, Pennsylvania; 41°3′19″N 75°30′41″W | | 1971–1981 (USAC); 1980, 1982–1989 (CART); 2013–2019 (ICS) | |
| Texas World Speedway (TWS) | 2.000-mile (3.219 km) paved oval | College Station, Texas; 30°32′13″N 96°13′16″W | | 1973, 1976–1979 (USAC) | Closed in 1989; reopened in 1993, closed again in 2015. Now the site of a housing development. |

=== Intermediate ovals ===
Note: The term intermediate oval is primarily used in NASCAR terminology. In IndyCar usage, such tracks are generally referred to as speedways or simply ovals. The classification is used to improve clarity and to allow comparison with track lists from other racing series. Only asphalt and concrete ovals are included in this list, with dirt and board tracks covered in separate categories.

| Track | Type and Length | Location | Map | Season(s) | Notes |
|---|---|---|---|---|---|
| Atlanta International Raceway (ATL) | 1.522-mile (2.449 km) paved oval | Atlanta, Georgia; 33°23′1″N 84°19′4″W | | 1965–1966, 1978 (USAC); 1979, 1981–1983 (CART) | Track reconfiguration in 1997 |
| Atlanta Motor Speedway (ATL) | 1.540-mile (2.478 km) paved oval | Atlanta, Georgia; 33°23′1″N 84°19′4″W | | 1998–2001 (IRL) | |
| Charlotte Motor Speedway (CLT) | 1.500-mile (2.414 km) paved oval | Concord, North Carolina | | 1997–1999 (IRL) | |
| Chicagoland Speedway (CHI) | 1.500-mile (2.414 km) paved oval 1.520-mile (2.446 km) paved oval | Joliet, Illinois | | 2001–2002 (IRL); 2003–2010 (ICS) | |
| Darlington Raceway (DAR) | 1.250-mile (2.012 km) paved oval | Darlington, South Carolina | | 1950–1951 (AAA) | |
| Darlington Raceway (DAR) | 1.375-mile (2.213 km) paved oval | Darlington, South Carolina | | 1954 (AAA), 1956 (USAC) | |
| Emerson Fittipaldi Speedway (EFS) | 1.864-mile (3.000 km) paved oval | Rio de Janeiro, Rio de Janeiro, Brazil; 22°58′32″S 43°23′42″W | | 1996–2000 (CART) | |
| Homestead–Miami Speedway (HOM) | 1.527-mile (2.457 km) paved oval | Homestead, Florida; 25°27′6″N 80°24′31″W | | 1996 (CART) | |
| Homestead–Miami Speedway (HOM) | 1.517-mile (2.441 km) paved oval | Homestead, Florida; 25°27′6″N 80°24′31″W | | 1997 (CART) | |
| Homestead–Miami Speedway (HOM) | 1.500-mile (2.414 km) paved oval 1.502-mile (2.417 km) paved oval | Homestead, Florida; 25°27′6″N 80°24′31″W | | 1998–2000 (CART); 2001–2002 (IRL); 2003 (ICS) | |
| Homestead–Miami Speedway (HOM) | 1.485-mile (2.390 km) paved oval | Homestead, Florida; 25°27′6″N 80°24′31″W | | 2004–2010 (ICS) | |
| Kansas Speedway (KAN) | 1.500-mile (2.414 km) paved oval 1.520-mile (2.446 km) paved oval | Kansas City, Kansas | | 2001–2002 (IRL); 2003–2010 (ICS) | |
| Kentucky Speedway (KEN) | 1.500-mile (2.414 km) paved oval 1.480-mile (2.382 km) paved oval | Sparta, Kentucky | | 2000–2002 (IRL); 2003–2011 (ICS) | |
| Las Vegas Motor Speedway (LVS) | 1.500-mile (2.414 km) paved oval | Las Vegas, Nevada; 36°16′17″N 115°0′40″W | | 1996–2000 (IRL); 2004–2005 (CCWS) | |
| Las Vegas Motor Speedway (LVS) | 1.500-mile (2.414 km) paved oval 1.544-mile (2.485 km) paved oval | Las Vegas, Nevada; 36°16′17″N 115°0′40″W | | 2011 (ICS) | |
| Marchbanks Speedway; Hanford Motor Speedway (HAN) | 1.500-mile (2.414 km) paved oval 1.400-mile (2.253 km) paved oval 1.375-mile (2.213 km) paved oval | Hanford, California | Marchbanks Speedway (Hanford Motor Speedway) | 1967–1969 (USAC) | Long track built in 1960; complex demolished in 1984. |
| Nashville Superspeedway (NSS) | 1.330-mile (2.140 km) concrete oval 1.333-mile (2.145 km) concrete oval | Lebanon, Tennessee | | 2001–2002 (IRL); 2003–2009, 2024–2026 (ICS) | |
| Rockingham Motor Speedway (RMS) | 1.479-mile (2.380 km) paved oval | North Northamptonshire, United Kingdom; 52°30′54″N 0°39′27″W | | 2001–2002 (CART) | |
| Texas Motor Speedway (TMS) | 1.500-mile (2.414 km) paved oval 1.455-mile (2.342 km) paved oval | Fort Worth, Texas; 33°2′13″N 97°16′59″W | | 1997–2002 (IRL); 2003–2016 (ICS) | |
| Texas Motor Speedway (TMS) | 1.482-mile (2.385 km) paved oval | Fort Worth, Texas; 33°2′13″N 97°16′59″W | | 2001 (CART) | |
| Texas Motor Speedway (TMS) | 1.500-mile (2.414 km) paved oval 1.440-mile (2.317 km) paved oval | Fort Worth, Texas; 33°2′13″N 97°16′59″W | | 2017–2023 (ICS) | |
| Trenton Speedway (TRE) | 1.500-mile (2.414 km) paved oval | Trenton, New Jersey; 40°14′21″N 74°43′16″W | | 1969–1978 (USAC), 1979 (CART) | Track closed in 1980. Now the site of a sculpture garden and a housing development. |
| Twin Ring Motegi (MOT) | 1.548-mile (2.491 km) paved oval (CART) | Motegi, Tochigi, Japan; 36°32′1″N 140°13′39″E | | 1998–2002 (CART) | Oval closed in 2011 after damage from earthquake. Road Course still in use by MotoGP and the Super Formula series. The demolition of the oval had begun in 2026. |
| Twin Ring Motegi (MOT) | 1.522-mile (2.449 km) paved oval (ICS) | Motegi, Tochigi, Japan; 36°32′1″N 140°13′39″E | | 2003–2010 (ICS) | Oval closed in 2011 after damage from earthquake. Road Course still in use by MotoGP and the Super Formula series. The demolition of the oval had begun in 2026. |
| World Wide Technology Raceway (WWT) (formerly Gateway Motorsports Park, GTW) | 1.270-mile (2.044 km) paved oval | Madison, Illinois; 38°39′3″N 90°8′7″W | | 1997–2000 (CART) | |
| World Wide Technology Raceway (WWT) (formerly Gateway Motorsports Park, GTW) | 1.250-mile (2.012 km) paved oval | Madison, Illinois; 38°39′3″N 90°8′7″W | | 2001–2002 (IRL); 2003, 2017–2026 (ICS) | |

=== Short (mile) ovals ===
Note: In the IndyCar Series and its predecessor championships, oval tracks with a length of approximately one mile are typically classified as short ovals. This classification differs from that used in some other American racing series and is influenced by the fact that IndyCar and its predecessor series have historically raced less frequently on tracks shorter than one mile. Only asphalt and concrete ovals are included in this list, with dirt and board tracks covered in separate categories.

| Track | Type and Length | Location | Map | Season(s) | Notes |
|---|---|---|---|---|---|
| Chicago Motor Speedway (CIC) | 1.029-mile (1.656 km) paved oval | Cicero, Illinois; 41°49′50″N 87°44′55″W | Chicago Motor Speedway oval | 1999–2002 (CART) | Track demolished in 2009, now the site of a Walmart. |
| Dover Motor Speedway (DOV) | 1.000-mile (1.609 km) paved oval | Dover, Delaware | | 1969 (USAC) | |
| Dover Motor Speedway (DOV) | 1.000-mile (1.609 km) concrete oval | Dover, Delaware | | 1998–1999 (IRL) | |
| Iowa Speedway (IOW) | 0.894-mile (1.439 km) paved oval | Newton, Iowa | | 2007–2025 (ICS) | |
| Langhorne Speedway (LHS) | 1.000-mile (1.609 km) paved oval | Langhorne, Pennsylvania; 40.178224°N 74.884602°W | | 1965–1970 (USAC) | |
| Milwaukee Mile (MIL) | 1.000-mile (1.609 km) paved oval | West Allis, Wisconsin; 43°1′7″N 88°0′37″W | | 1954–1955 (AAA); 1956–1979 (USAC); 1980–1995 (CART) | |
| Milwaukee Mile (MIL) | 1.000-mile (1.609 km) paved oval 1.032-mile (1.661 km) paved oval | West Allis, Wisconsin; 43°1′7″N 88°0′37″W | | 1996–2003 (CART); 2004–2006 (CCWS); 2004–2009 (ICS) | |
| Milwaukee Mile (MIL) | 1.000-mile (1.609 km) paved oval 1.015-mile (1.633 km) paved oval | West Allis, Wisconsin; 43°1′7″N 88°0′37″W | | 2011–2015, 2024–2026 (ICS) | |
| Nazareth Speedway (NAZ) | 1.000-mile (1.609 km) paved oval | Nazareth, Pennsylvania; 40°43′37″N 75°19′14″W | | 1987–1995 (CART) | Closed in 2004 and grandstands were moved to Watkins Glen in 2005, still not demolished but left to decay. Ground is up for sale for non-racing purposes. |
| Nazareth Speedway (NAZ) | 0.946-mile (1.522 km) paved oval | Nazareth, Pennsylvania; 40°43′37″N 75°19′14″W | | 1996–2001 (CART) | Closed in 2004 and grandstands were moved to Watkins Glen in 2005, still not demolished but left to decay. Ground is up for sale for non-racing purposes. |
| Nazareth Speedway (NAZ) | 0.935-mile (1.505 km) paved oval | Nazareth, Pennsylvania; 40°43′37″N 75°19′14″W | | 2002 (IRL); 2003–2004 (ICS) | Closed in 2004 and grandstands were moved to Watkins Glen in 2005, still not demolished but left to decay. Ground is up for sale for non-racing purposes. |
| New Hampshire Motor Speedway (NHS) | 1.058-mile (1.703 km) paved oval | Loudon, New Hampshire; 43°21′44″N 71°27′41″W | | 1992–1995 (CART); 1996–2000 (IRL) | |
| New Hampshire Motor Speedway (NHS) | 1.000-mile (1.609 km) paved oval 1.025-mile (1.650 km) paved oval | Loudon, New Hampshire; 43°21′44″N 71°27′41″W | | 2011 (ICS) | |
| Phoenix Raceway (PHX) | 1.000-mile (1.609 km) paved oval | Avondale, Arizona; 33°22′29″N 112°18′40″W | | 1964–1978 (USAC); 1979–1995 (CART); 1996–2002 (IRL); 2003–2005 (ICS) | |
| Phoenix Raceway (PHX) | 1.000-mile (1.609 km) paved oval 1.022-mile (1.645 km) paved oval | Avondale, Arizona; 33°22′29″N 112°18′40″W | Track map of Phoenix Raceway. | 2016–2019 (ICS) | |
| Phoenix Raceway (PHX) | 1.000-mile (1.609 km) paved oval 1.022-mile (1.645 km) paved oval | Avondale, Arizona; 33°22′29″N 112°18′40″W | | 2026 (ICS) | |
| Pikes Peak International Raceway (PPR) | 1.000-mile (1.609 km) paved oval | Fountain, Colorado | | 1997–2002 (IRL); 2003–2005 (ICS) | Track closed in 2005 and reopened with new owners. Sales contract prohibits the holding of national or international races with more than 5000 spectators. Therefore, only used for local racing series or as a test track. The racetrack is scheduled to be permanently closed and dismantled in 2026. |
| Richmond Raceway (RIC) | 0.750-mile (1.207 km) paved oval | Richmond, Virginia | | 2001–2002 (IRL); 2003–2009 (ICS) | |
| Sanair Super Speedway (SAN) | 0.826-mile (1.329 km) paved oval | Saint-Pie, Quebec, Canada; 45°31′45″N 72°53′1″W | | 1984–1986 (CART) | |
| Trenton Speedway (TRE) | 1.000-mile (1.609 km) paved oval | Trenton, New Jersey; 40°14′21″N 74°43′16″W | | 1957–1968 (USAC) | Track converted into 1.5 mile kidney bean shape in 1969. |
| Walt Disney World Speedway (WDW) | 1.000-mile (1.609 km) paved oval | Bay Lake, Florida | | 1996–2000 (IRL) | Track razed in 2015 to make room for parking lot. |

=== Permanent road courses ===
| Track | Type and Length | Direction | Location | Map | Season(s) | Notes |
|---|---|---|---|---|---|---|
| Autódromo Hermanos Rodríguez (AHR) | 2.480-mile (3.991 km) paved road course | Clockwise | Mexico City, Mexico; 19°24′15″N 99°5′19″W | | 1980–1981 (CART) | |
| Autódromo Hermanos Rodríguez (AHR) | 2.786-mile (4.484 km) paved road course | Clockwise | Mexico City, Mexico; 19°24′15″N 99°5′19″W | | 2002–2003 (CART); 2004–2005 (CCWS) | |
| Autódromo Hermanos Rodríguez (AHR) | 2.774-mile (4.464 km) paved road course | Clockwise | Mexico City, Mexico; 19°24′15″N 99°5′19″W | | 2006–2007 (CCWS) | |
| Barber Motorsports Park (BAR) | 2.380-mile (3.830 km) paved road course | Clockwise | Birmingham, Alabama | | 2010–2019, 2021–2026 (ICS) | |
| Brands Hatch (BRH) | 1.200-mile (1.931 km) paved road course | Clockwise | Swanley, Kent, United Kingdom; 51°21′25″N 0°15′47″E | | 1978 (USAC); 2003 (CART) | |
| Circuit Gilles Villeneuve (CGV) | 2.747-mile (4.421 km) paved road course | Clockwise | Montreal, Quebec, Canada; 45°30′21″N 73°31′36″W | | 2002 (CART) | |
| Circuit Gilles Villeneuve (CGV) | 2.709-mile (4.360 km) paved road course | Clockwise | Montreal, Quebec, Canada; 45°30′21″N 73°31′36″W | | 2003 (CART); 2004–2006 (CCWS) | |
| Circuit Mont-Tremblant (CMT) | 2.650-mile (4.265 km) paved road course | Clockwise | Mont-Tremblant, Quebec, Canada; 46°11′16″N 74°36′36″W | | 1967–1968 (USAC) | |
| Circuit Mont-Tremblant (CMT) | 2.621-mile (4.218 km) paved road course | Clockwise | Mont-Tremblant, Quebec, Canada; 46°11′16″N 74°36′36″W | | 2007 (CCWS) | |
| Continental Divide Raceways | 2.660-mile (4.281 km) paved road course | Clockwise | Castle Rock, Colorado | | 1968–1970 (USAC) | Permanently closed in 1983. |
| Indianapolis Motor Speedway (IGP) | 2.439-mile (3.925 km) paved road course | Clockwise | Speedway, Indiana; 39°47′54″N 86°13′58″W | | 2014–2026 (ICS) | |
| Indianapolis Raceway Park (IRP) | 1.875-mile (3.018 km) paved road course | Clockwise | Brownsburg, Indiana | | 1965–1967 (USAC) | |
| Indianapolis Raceway Park (IRP) | 2.500-mile (4.023 km) paved road course | Clockwise | Brownsburg, Indiana | | 1968–1970 (USAC) | |
| Laguna Seca Raceway (LAG) | 1.900-mile (3.058 km) paved road course | Counter-clockwise | Monterey, California; 36°35′05″N 121°45′10″W | | 1983–1987 (CART) | |
| Laguna Seca Raceway (LAG) | 2.214-mile (3.563 km) paved road course | Counter-clockwise | Monterey, California; 36°35′05″N 121°45′10″W | | 1988–1995 (CART) | |
| Laguna Seca Raceway (LAG) | 2.238-mile (3.602 km) paved road course | Counter-clockwise | Monterey, California; 36°35′05″N 121°45′10″W | Laguna Seca | 1996–2003 (CART); 2004 (CCWS); 2019, 2021–2026 (ICS) | |
| Mid-Ohio Sports Car Course (MOH) | 2.400-mile (3.862 km) paved road course | Clockwise | Lexington, Ohio; 40°41′21″N 82°38′11″W | | 1980 (USAC/CART); 1983–1989 (CART) | |
| Mid-Ohio Sports Car Course (MOH) | 2.250-mile (3.621 km) paved road course | Clockwise | Lexington, Ohio; 40°41′21″N 82°38′11″W | | 1990–1996 (CART) | |
| Mid-Ohio Sports Car Course (MOH) | 2.258-mile (3.634 km) paved road course | Clockwise | Lexington, Ohio; 40°41′21″N 82°38′11″W | | 1997–2003 (CART); 2007–2026 (ICS) | |
| Mosport Park (CMP, MOS) | 2.459-mile (3.957 km) paved road course | Clockwise | Bowmanville, Ontario, Canada | | 1967–1968, 1977–1978 (USAC) | |
| Portland International Raceway (PIR) | 1.915-mile (3.082 km) paved road course | Clockwise | Portland, Oregon; 45°35′49″N 122°41′45″W | | 1984–1987 (CART) | |
| Portland International Raceway (PIR) | 1.922-mile (3.093 km) paved road course | Clockwise | Portland, Oregon; 45°35′49″N 122°41′45″W | | 1988–1991 (CART) | |
| Portland International Raceway (PIR) | 1.950-mile (3.138 km) paved road course | Clockwise | Portland, Oregon; 45°35′49″N 122°41′45″W | | 1992–1996 (CART) | |
| Portland International Raceway (PIR) | 1.969-mile (3.169 km) paved road course | Clockwise | Portland, Oregon; 45°35′49″N 122°41′45″W | | 1999–2003 (CART); 2004 (CCWS) | |
| Portland International Raceway (PIR) | 1.964-mile (3.161 km) paved road course | Clockwise | Portland, Oregon; 45°35′49″N 122°41′45″W | | 2005–2007 (CCWS) | |
| Portland International Raceway (PIR) | 1.967-mile (3.166 km) paved road course | Clockwise | Portland, Oregon; 45°35′49″N 122°41′45″W | | 1997–1998 (CART); 2018–2019, 2021–2026 (ICS) | |
| Riverside International Raceway (RIV) | 2.600-mile (4.184 km) paved road course | Clockwise | Riverside, California; 33°56′13″N 117°16′21″W | | 1967–1969 (USAC) | Permanently closed in 1989. Now site of a shopping mall and houses. |
| Riverside International Raceway (RIV) | 3.251-mile (5.232 km) paved road course | Clockwise | Riverside, California; 33°56′13″N 117°16′21″W | | 1981–1983 (CART) | Permanently closed in 1989. Now site of a shopping mall and houses. |
| Road America (ROA) | 4.000-mile (6.437 km) paved road course | Clockwise | Elkhart Lake, Wisconsin; 43°48′0″N 87°59′13″W | | 1982–1996 (CART) | |
| Road America (ROA) | 4.048-mile (6.515 km) paved road course | Clockwise | Elkhart Lake, Wisconsin; 43°48′0″N 87°59′13″W | | 1997–2003 (CART); 2004, 2006–2007 (CCWS) | |
| Road America (ROA) | 4.014-mile (6.460 km) paved road course | Clockwise | Elkhart Lake, Wisconsin; 43°48′0″N 87°59′13″W | | 2016–2026 (ICS) | |
| Sonoma Raceway (SON) | 2.523-mile (4.060 km) paved road course | Clockwise | Sonoma, California | | 1970 (USAC) | |
| Sonoma Raceway (SON) | 2.300-mile (3.701 km) paved road course | Clockwise | Sonoma, California | | 2005–2007 (ICS) | |
| Sonoma Raceway (SON) | 2.303-mile (3.706 km) paved road course | Clockwise | Sonoma, California | | 2008–2011 (ICS) | |
| Sonoma Raceway (SON) | 2.310-mile (3.718 km) paved road course | Clockwise | Sonoma, California | | 2012–2015 (ICS) | |
| Sonoma Raceway (SON) | 2.385-mile (3.838 km) paved road course | Clockwise | Sonoma, California | | 2016–2018 (ICS) | |
| Watkins Glen (WGL) | 2.428-mile (3.907 km) paved road course | Clockwise | Watkins Glen, New York; 42°20′13″N 76°55′38″W | | 1979–1980 (CART) | |
| Watkins Glen (WGL) | 3.377-mile (5.435 km) paved road course | Clockwise | Watkins Glen, New York; 42°20′13″N 76°55′38″W | | 1981(CART) | |
| Watkins Glen (WGL) | 3.370-mile (5.423 km) paved road course | Clockwise | Watkins Glen, New York; 42°20′13″N 76°55′38″W | | 2005–2010, 2016–2017 (ICS) | |

=== Temporary street or airport circuits ===
| Track | Type and Length | Direction | Location | Map | Season(s) | Notes |
|---|---|---|---|---|---|---|
| Arlington Street Circuit (ARL) | 2.730-mile (4.394 km) paved street circuit | Clockwise | Arlington, Texas | | 2026 (ICS) | |
| Baltimore Street Circuit (BAL) | 2.040-mile (3.283 km) paved street circuit | Clockwise | Baltimore, Maryland | | 2011–2013 (ICS) | |
| Caesars Palace Street Circuit (CPL) | 1.125-mile (1.811 km) paved street circuit | Counter-clockwise | Las Vegas, Nevada; 36°07′1″N 115°10′30″W | | 1983–1984 (CART) | |
| Cleveland Burke Lakefront Airport Circuit (CLE) | 2.480-mile (3.991 km) concrete airfield circuit | Clockwise | Cleveland, Ohio; 41°31′2″N 81°40′59″W | | 1982–1989 (CART) | |
| Cleveland Burke Lakefront Airport Circuit (CLE) | 2.369-mile (3.813 km) concrete airfield circuit | Clockwise | Cleveland, Ohio; 41°31′2″N 81°40′59″W | | 1990–1996 (CART) | |
| Cleveland Burke Lakefront Airport Circuit (CLE) | 2.106-mile (3.389 km) concrete airfield circuit | Clockwise | Cleveland, Ohio; 41°31′2″N 81°40′59″W | | 1997–2003 (CART); 2004–2007 (CCWS) | |
| Denver Street Circuit (DEN) | 1.901-mile (3.059 km) paved street circuit | Clockwise | Denver, Colorado; 39°44′21″N 104°59′22″W | | 1990–1991 (CART) | |
| Denver Street Circuit (DEN) | 1.647-mile (2.651 km) paved street circuit | Counter-clockwise | Denver, Colorado; 39°44′48″N 105°0′23″W | | 2002–2003 (CART) | |
| Denver Street Circuit (DEN) | 1.657-mile (2.667 km) paved street circuit | Counter-clockwise | Denver, Colorado; 39°44′48″N 105°0′23″W | | 2004–2006 (CCWS) | |
| Detroit Street Circuit (DET) | 2.520-mile (4.056 km) paved street circuit | Clockwise | Detroit, Michigan; 42°19′47″N 83°2′24″W | | 1989–1991 (CART) | |
| Detroit Street Circuit (DET) | 1.645-mile (2.647 km) paved street circuit | Counter-clockwise | Detroit, Michigan | | 2023–2026 (ICS) | |
| Detroit Raceway at Belle Isle Park (BEL) | 2.100-mile (3.380 km) paved street circuit | Clockwise | Detroit, Michigan42°20′10″N 82°59′44″W | | 1992–1997 (CART) | |
| Detroit Raceway at Belle Isle Park (BEL) | 2.096-mile (3.373 km) paved street circuit 2.070-mile (3.331 km) paved street circuit | Clockwise | Detroit, Michigan42°20′10″N 82°59′44″W | | 2007–2008 (ICS) | |
| Detroit Raceway at Belle Isle Park (BEL) | 2.070-mile (3.331 km) paved street circuit | Clockwise | Detroit, Michigan42°20′10″N 82°59′44″W | | 2012 (ICS) | |
| Detroit Raceway at Belle Isle Park (BEL) | 2.346-mile (3.776 km) paved street circuit | Clockwise | Detroit, Michigan42°20′10″N 82°59′44″W | | 1998–2001 (CART) | |
| Detroit Raceway at Belle Isle Park (BEL) | 2.346-mile (3.776 km) paved street circuit 2.350-mile (3.782 km) paved street circuit | Clockwise | Detroit, Michigan42°20′10″N 82°59′44″W | | 2013 (ICS) | |
| Detroit Raceway at Belle Isle Park (BEL) | 2.360-mile (3.798 km) paved street circuit 2.350-mile (3.782 km) paved street circuit | Clockwise | Detroit, Michigan42°20′10″N 82°59′44″W | | 2014 (ICS) | |
| Detroit Raceway at Belle Isle Park (BEL) | 2.350-mile (3.782 km) paved street circuit | Clockwise | Detroit, Michigan42°20′10″N 82°59′44″W | | 2015–2019, 2021–2022 (ICS) | |
| Edmonton City Centre Airport Circuit (EDM) | 1.973-mile (3.175 km) paved airfield / street circuit | Clockwise | Edmonton, Alberta, Canada; 53°34′32″N 113°31′23″W | | 2005–2007 (CCWS); 2008–2010 (ICS) | |
| Edmonton City Centre Airport Circuit (EDM) | 2.224-mile (3.579 km) paved airfield / street circuit 2.256-mile (3.631 km) paved airfield / street circuit | Counter-clockwise | Edmonton, Alberta, Canada; 53°34′32″N 113°31′23″W | | 2011–2012 (ICS) | |
| Fundidora Park Circuit (MTY) | 2.104-mile (3.386 km) paved street circuit | Counter-clockwise | Monterrey, Nuevo León, Mexico; 25°40′41″N 100°17′00″W | | 2001–2003 (CART); 2004–2006 (CCWS) | |
| Houston Street Circuit (HOU) | 1.527-mile (2.457 km) paved street circuit | Counter-clockwise | Houston, Texas; 29°45′10″N 95°21′34″W | | 1998–2001 (CART) | |
| Houston Street Circuit (HOU) | 1.690-mile (2.720 km) paved street circuit | Counter-clockwise | Houston, Texas; 29°40′56″N 95°24′31″W | | 2006 (CCWS) | |
| Houston Street Circuit (HOU) | 1.683-mile (2.709 km) paved street circuit | Counter-clockwise | Houston, Texas; 29°40′56″N 95°24′31″W | | 2007 (CCWS) | |
| Houston Street Circuit (HOU) | 1.634-mile (2.630 km) paved street circuit | Counter-clockwise | Houston, Texas; 29°40′56″N 95°24′31″W | | 2013–2014 (ICS) | |
| Long Beach Street Circuit (LBH) | 1.670-mile (2.688 km) paved street circuit | Clockwise | Long Beach, California; 33°45′59″N 118°11′34″W | | 1984–1986 (CART) | |
| Long Beach Street Circuit (LBH) | 1.670-mile (2.688 km) paved street circuit | Clockwise | Long Beach, California; 33°45′59″N 118°11′34″W | | 1987–1991 (CART) | |
| Long Beach Street Circuit (LBH) | 1.590-mile (2.559 km) paved street circuit | Clockwise | Long Beach, California; 33°45′59″N 118°11′34″W | | 1992–1996 (CART) | |
| Long Beach Street Circuit (LBH) | 1.586-mile (2.552 km) paved street circuit 1.590-mile (2.559 km) paved street circuit | Clockwise | Long Beach, California; 33°45′59″N 118°11′34″W | | 1997 (CART) | |
| Long Beach Street Circuit (LBH) | 1.574-mile (2.533 km) paved street circuit | Clockwise | Long Beach, California; 33°45′59″N 118°11′34″W | | 1998 (CART) | |
| Long Beach Street Circuit (LBH) | 1.824-mile (2.935 km) paved street circuit | Clockwise | Long Beach, California; 33°45′59″N 118°11′34″W | | 1999 (CART) | |
| Long Beach Street Circuit (LBH) | 1.968-mile (3.167 km) paved street circuit | Clockwise | Long Beach, California; 33°45′59″N 118°11′34″W | | 2000–2003 (CART); 2004–2007 (CCWS); 2008–2026 (ICS) | |
| Meadowlands Sports Complex (MEA) | 1.683-mile (2.709 km) paved street circuit | Counter-clockwise | East Rutherford, New Jersey; 40°48′51″N 74°04′26″W | | 1984–1987 (CART) | |
| Meadowlands Sports Complex (MEA) | 1.217-mile (1.959 km) paved street circuit | Counter-clockwise | East Rutherford, New Jersey; 40°48′51″N 74°04′26″W | | 1988–1991 (CART) | |
| Miami Street Circuit (MIA, BAY, BIC, TAM) | 1.784-mile (2.871 km) paved street circuit | Clockwise | University Park, Florida; 25°44′59″N 80°22′45″W | | 1985–1988 (CART) | |
| Miami Street Circuit (MIA, BAY, BIC, TAM) | 1.873-mile (3.014 km) paved street circuit | Counter-clockwise | Miami, Florida; 25°46′30″N 80°11′10″W | | 1995 (CART) | |
| Miami Street Circuit (MIA, BAY, BIC, TAM) | 1.388-mile (2.234 km) paved street circuit | Counter-clockwise | Miami, Florida; 25°46′30″N 80°11′10″W | | 2002 (CART) | |
| Miami Street Circuit (MIA, BAY, BIC, TAM) | 1.150-mile (1.851 km) paved street circuit | Counter-clockwise | Miami, Florida; 25°46′30″N 80°11′10″W | | 2003 (CART) | |
| Nashville Street Circuit (NSV) | 2.170-mile (3.492 km) paved street circuit | Counter-clockwise | Nashville, Tennessee | | 2021–2023 (ICS) | |
| San Jose Street Circuit (SJO) | 1.448-mile (2.330 km) paved street circuit | Clockwise | San Jose, California; 37°19′41″N 121°53′26″W | | 2005 (CCWS) | |
| San Jose Street Circuit (SJO) | 1.443-mile (2.322 km) paved street circuit | Clockwise | San Jose, California; 37°19′41″N 121°53′26″W | | 2006–2007 (CCWS) | |
| São Paulo Street Circuit (SAO) | 2.536-mile (4.081 km) paved street circuit | Clockwise | São Paulo, Brazil | | 2010–2013 (ICS) | |
| St. Petersburg Street Circuit (STP) | 1.806-mile (2.906 km) paved airfield / street circuit | Clockwise | St. Petersburg, Florida; 27°45′59″N 82°37′45″W | | 2003 (CART) | |
| St. Petersburg Street Circuit (STP) | 1.800-mile (2.897 km) paved airfield / street circuit | Clockwise | St. Petersburg, Florida; 27°45′59″N 82°37′45″W | | 2005–2026 (ICS) | |
| Surfers Paradise Street Circuit (SUR) | 2.793-mile (4.495 km) paved airfield / street circuit | Counter-clockwise | Surfers Paradise, Queensland, Australia; 27°59′18″S 153°25′42″E | | 1991 (CART) | Track still in use for Supercars Championship |
| Surfers Paradise Street Circuit (SUR) | 2.804-mile (4.513 km) paved airfield / street circuit | Counter-clockwise | Surfers Paradise, Queensland, Australia; 27°59′18″S 153°25′42″E | | 1995 (CART) | Track still in use for Supercars Championship |
| Surfers Paradise Street Circuit (SUR) | 2.794-mile (4.497 km) paved airfield / street circuit | Counter-clockwise | Surfers Paradise, Queensland, Australia; 27°59′18″S 153°25′42″E | | 1996 (CART) | Track still in use for Supercars Championship |
| Surfers Paradise Street Circuit (SUR) | 2.795-mile (4.498 km) paved airfield / street circuit | Counter-clockwise | Surfers Paradise, Queensland, Australia; 27°59′18″S 153°25′42″E | | 1992–1994; 1997–2003 (CART); 2004–2007 (CCWS); 2008 (ICS, NC) | Track still in use for Supercars Championship |
| Toronto Street Circuit (TOR) | 1.780-mile (2.865 km) paved street circuit 1.784-mile (2.871 km) paved street circuit | Clockwise | Toronto, Ontario, Canada; 43°37′58″N 79°24′58″W | | 1986–1995 (CART) | |
| Toronto Street Circuit (TOR) | 1.784-mile (2.871 km) paved street circuit | Clockwise | Toronto, Ontario, Canada; 43°37′58″N 79°24′58″W | | 1996 (CART) | |
| Toronto Street Circuit (TOR) | 1.721-mile (2.770 km) paved street circuit | Clockwise | Toronto, Ontario, Canada; 43°37′58″N 79°24′58″W | | 1997–1998 (CART) | |
| Toronto Street Circuit (TOR) | 1.755-mile (2.824 km) paved street circuit | Clockwise | Toronto, Ontario, Canada; 43°37′58″N 79°24′58″W | | 1999–2003 (CART), 2004–2007 (CCWS), 2011–2015 (ICS) | |
| Toronto Street Circuit (TOR) | 1.755-mile (2.824 km) paved street circuit 1.721-mile (2.770 km) paved street circuit | Clockwise | Toronto, Ontario, Canada; 43°37′58″N 79°24′58″W | | 2009–2010 (ICS) | |
| Toronto Street Circuit (TOR) | 1.786-mile (2.874 km) paved street circuit | Clockwise | Toronto, Ontario, Canada; 43°37′58″N 79°24′58″W | | 2016–2019, 2022–2025 (ICS) | |
| Vancouver Street Circuit (VAN) | 1.704-mile (2.742 km) paved street circuit 1.703-mile (2.741 km) paved street circuit | Clockwise | Vancouver, British Columbia, Canada; 49°16′35″N 123°6′25″W | | 1990, 1993 (CART) | |
| Vancouver Street Circuit (VAN) | 1.677-mile (2.699 km) paved street circuit 1.703-mile (2.741 km) paved street circuit | Clockwise | Vancouver, British Columbia, Canada; 49°16′35″N 123°6′25″W | | 1991–1992, 1994 (CART) | |
| Vancouver Street Circuit (VAN) | 1.703-mile (2.741 km) paved street circuit | Clockwise | Vancouver, British Columbia, Canada; 49°16′35″N 123°6′25″W | | 1995–1997 (CART) | |
| Vancouver Street Circuit (VAN) | 1.802-mile (2.900 km) paved street circuit | Clockwise | Vancouver, British Columbia, Canada; 49°16′35″N 123°6′25″W | | 1998 (CART) | |
| Vancouver Street Circuit (VAN) | 1.781-mile (2.866 km) paved street circuit | Clockwise | Vancouver, British Columbia, Canada; 49°16′35″N 123°6′25″W | | 1999–2003 (CART), 2004 (CCWS) | |

=== Dirt tracks ===
| Track | Type and Length | Location | Map | Season(s) | Notes |
|---|---|---|---|---|---|
| Arizona State Fairgrounds Speedway (ASF) | 1.000-mile (1.609 km) dirt oval | Phoenix, Arizona; 33°28′10″N 112°05′51″W | | 1915, 1950–1955 (AAA); 1956–1963 (USAC) | Track closed in 1964 and replaced by Phoenix International Raceway |
| Arlington Downs Raceway (ARD) | 1.062-mile (1.709 km) dirt oval | Arlington, Texas | | 1947–1949 (AAA) | Track closed in 1958 and was subsequently demolished |
| Bay Meadows Racetrack (BME) | 1.000-mile (1.609 km) dirt oval | San Francisco Bay Area, California; 33°28′10″N 112°05′51″W | | 1950–1951 (AAA) | Track closed in 2008 and was subsequently demolished |
| California State Fairgrounds Speedway (CSF) | 1.000-mile (1.609 km) dirt oval | Sacramento, California; 38°33′N 121°27′W | | 1949–1950, 1953–1955 (AAA); 1956–1970 (USAC) | The original race track will be turned into a college football stadium for the Sacramento State Hornets in 2026. The original stands will still be intact once play begins that fall. |
| Centennial Race Track (CEN) | 1.000-mile (1.609 km) dirt oval | Littleton, Colorado | | 1951–1952 (AAA) | Track was closed in 1983 and subsequently demolished. |
| DuQuoin State Fairgrounds Speedway (DQSF) | 1.000-mile (1.609 km) dirt oval | Du Quoin, Illinois; 37°58′58″N 89°13′23″W | | 1948–1949, 1951–1955 (AAA); 1956–1961, 1963–1970, 1982–1983 (USAC) | |
| Good Time Park (GOT) | 1.000-mile (1.609 km) dirt oval | Goshen, New York; 41°23′41″N 74°19′37″W | | 1936, 1946–1947 (AAA) | Track closed in 1956 and was subsequently demolished |
| Illinois State Fairgrounds Speedway (SPR) | 1.000-mile (1.609 km) dirt oval | Springfield, Illinois; 37°58′58″N 89°13′23″W | | 1934–1940, 1947–1955 (AAA); 1956–1970, 1981–1982 (USAC) | |
| Indiana State Fairgrounds Speedway (ISF) | 1.000-mile (1.609 km) dirt oval | Indianapolis, Indiana; 39°49′47.82″N 86°8′3.68″W | | 1941, 1953–1955 (AAA); 1956–1970, 1982 (USAC) | |
| Lakewood Speedway (LAK) | 1.000-mile (1.609 km) dirt oval | Lakewood Heights, Atlanta, Georgia | | 1946–1948, 1952 (AAA); 1956–1958 (USAC) | Track was closed in 1979 |
| Langhorne Speedway (LHS) | 1.000-mile (1.609 km) dirt circle | Langhorne, Pennsylvania; 40.178224°N 74.884602°W | | 1930, 1935, 1940–1941, 1946–1955 (AAA); 1956–1964 (USAC) | Track was paved and reconfigurated in 1965 and hosted further USAC championship events as paved oval. |
| Michigan State Fairgrounds Speedway (MSF) | 1.000-mile (1.609 km) dirt oval | Detroit, Michigan; 42°26′33″N 83°06′40″W | | 1928–1933, 1949–1953 (AAA); 1957 (USAC) | Track was closed in 1971 and demolished in 2001 |
| Milwaukee Mile (MIL); Wisconsin State Fair Park | 1.000-mile (1.609 km) dirt oval | West Allis, Wisconsin; 43°1′7″N 88°0′37″W | | 1939, 1941, 1946–1953 (AAA) | There were additional non-points events in 1937 and 1938. Track was paved in 1954 and hosted further USAC championship events as paved oval. |
| Nazareth Speedway (NAZ) | 1.125-mile (1.811 km) dirt oval | Nazareth, Pennsylvania; 40°43′37″N 75°19′14″W | | 1968–1969 (USAC) | Track was shortened in 1982 to exactly one mile and afterwards, in 1986, paved and reconfigurated into an dogleg tri-oval. |
| Nazareth Speedway (NAZ) | 1.000-mile (1.609 km) dirt oval | Nazareth, Pennsylvania; 40°43′37″N 75°19′14″W | | 1982 (USAC) | Track was shortened in 1982 to exactly one mile and afterwards, in 1986, paved and reconfigurated into an dogleg tri-oval. |
| San Jose Speedway (SJS) | 1.000-mile (1.609 km) dirt oval | San Jose, California; 37°18′0″N 121°51′5″W | | 1951–1952 (AAA) | Track was reconfigurated in 1978 to an 0.5-mile dirt oval and closed in 1999. |
| Syracuse Mile (SYR); New York State Fairgrounds | 1.000-mile (1.609 km) dirt oval | Syracuse, New York | | 1924, 1928–1941, 1949–1955 (AAA); 1956–1962 (USAC) | Track closed in 2015 |
| Trenton Speedway (TRE) | 1.000-mile (1.609 km) dirt oval | Trenton, New Jersey; 40°14′21″N 74°43′16″W | | 1949 (AAA) | Track was paved in 1957 and hosted further USAC championship events as paved oval. |

== Tracks used one time for championship event ==
The following table shows all tracks that had only one single points paying event in ACCR (AAA, USAC, CART, IndyCar) and were not visited again. Events with multiple heat races are also included when all the heats took place as part of a single event. Some racetracks are temporary and were built on airfields or fairgrounds or in stadiums.

| Track | Type and Length | Direction | Location | Map | Named race | Season | Notes |
|---|---|---|---|---|---|---|---|
| Bainbridge Fairgrounds (BAI) | 1.000-mile (1.609 km) dirt oval | Counter-clockwise | Bainbridge, Ohio | | Bainbridge 100 | 1947 (AAA) | Closed in 1951. Track demolished after closing. |
| Del Mar Fairgrounds (DMR) | 1.000-mile (1.609 km) dirt oval | Counter-clockwise | Del Mar, California | | Del Mar 100 | 1949 (AAA) | Track still in use for horse racing |
| Raleigh Speedway (RAL) | 1.000-mile (1.609 km) paved oval | Counter-clockwise | Raleigh, North Carolina | | Raleigh 200 | 1952 (AAA) | Closed in 1958. Track demolished in 1967. Now the site of an industrial park. |
| Las Vegas Park Speedway (LVG) | 1.000-mile (1.609 km) dirt oval | Counter-clockwise | Las Vegas, Nevada | | Silver State Century | 1954 (AAA) | Closed in 1959. Track demolished after closing. |
| Daytona International Speedway (DAY) | 2.500-mile (4.023 km) paved oval | Counter-clockwise | Daytona Beach, Florida | Track map of Daytona International Speedway. | Daytona 100 | 1959 (USAC) | Track still in use by NASCAR for its signature event, the Daytona 500 |
| Stardust International Raceway (STR) | 3.000-mile (4.828 km) paved road course | Clockwise | Las Vegas, Nevada | Track map of Stardust Raceway. | Stardust 150 | 1968 (USAC) | Closed in 1971. Track demolished after closing and it's now location of the Las Vegas Motor Speedway. |
| Brainerd International Raceway (BRN) | 2.660-mile (4.281 km) paved road course 2.833-mile (4.559 km) paved road course | Clockwise | Brainerd, Minnesota | Track map of Brainerd Intl. Raceway. | Brainerd 200 | 1969 (USAC) | |
| Seattle International Raceway (SEA) | 2.250-mile (3.621 km) paved road course 2.200-mile (3.541 km) paved road course | Counter–clockwise | Kent, Washington | Track map of Pacific Raceways. | Dan Gurney 200 | 1969 (USAC) | |
| Missouri State Fairgrounds (SED) | 1.000-mile (1.609 km) dirt oval | Counter-clockwise | Sedalia, Missouri | | Sedalia 100 | 1970 (USAC) | Fairgrounds is still open, but the track no longer exists. |
| Autodromo Ingeniero Juan R. Bascolo (RAF) | 2.874-mile (4.625 km) paved flat oval | Counter-clockwise | Rafaela, Argentina | Track map of Autódromo Ciudad de Rafaela. | Rafaela Indy 300 | 1971 (USAC) | Track still in use by regional stock car series |
| Silverstone Circuit (SLV) | 2.932-mile (4.719 km) paved road course | Clockwise | Silverstone, United Kingdom | Track map of Silverstone Circuit. | Daily Express Indy Silverstone | 1978 (USAC) | Track still in use by Formula One |
| Las Vegas Street Circuit (LAS) | 2.440-mile (3.927 km) paved street circuit | Counter-clockwise | Las Vegas, Nevada | Track map of Las Vegas street circuit. | Vegas Grand Prix | 2007 (CCWS) | Track closed after the event, now replaced by Las Vegas Strip Circuit for Formula One |
| Circuit Zolder (ZOL) | 2.492-mile (4.010 km) paved road course | Clockwise | Heusden-Zolder, Belgium | Track map of Circuit Zolder. | Belgian Champ Car Grand Prix | 2007 (CCWS) | Track still in use by NASCAR Euro Series |
| TT Circuit Assen (ASN) | 2.830-mile (4.554 km) paved road course | Clockwise | Assen, Netherlands | Track map of TT Circuit Assen. | Bavaria Champ Car Grand Prix | 2007 (CCWS) | Track still in use by Moto GP |
| Twin Ring Motegi (MOT) | 2.983-mile (4.801 km) paved road course | Clockwise | Motegi, Japan | Track map of Twin Ring Motegi road course. | Indy Japan 300: The Final | 2011 (ICS) | The race was originally scheduled to take place on the oval track, which was damaged by an earthquake in March 2011. |
| NOLA Motorsports Park (NOL) | 2.672-mile (4.300 km) paved road course | Clockwise | Avondale, Louisiana | Track map of Nola Motorsports Park | Indy Grand Prix of Louisiana | 2015 (ICS) | Track still in use for local racing series and club racing |
| Circuit of the Americas (COA) | 3.426-mile (5.514 km) paved road course | Counter-clockwise | Austin, Texas | Track map of Circuit of the Americas | IndyCar Classic | 2019 (ICS) | Track still in use by Formula One |
| Thermal Club (THE) | 3.067-mile (4.936 km) paved road course | Counter-clockwise | Thermal, California | Track map of Thermal Club Indy circuit | The Thermal Club IndyCar Grand Prix | 2025 (ICS) | Track still in use for club racing, IndyCar held also an exhibition race in 2024. |

== Other tracks, which were part of the official ACCR calendar ==
This table includes tracks used solely for exhibition races, non-points races or other special events, which were run under different rules or co-sanctioned with other bodies.

| Track | Type and Length | Direction | Location | Map | Named race | Season | Notes |
|---|---|---|---|---|---|---|---|
| Pikes Peak International Hill Climb (PIK, PPIHC) | 12.42-mile (19.99 km) point-to-point-track | – | Pikes Peak, Colorado; 38.84°N 105.04°W | | The Race to the Cloud | 1946–1955 (AAA); 1956–1970 (USAC) | This track hosted rally-style races, that were a special event and official part of the National Championship racing calendar between 1946 and 1970. Between 1947 and 1955—and again from 1965 to 1969—championship points were awarded for the race. AAA scored it as a 100-mile oval race, while USAC scored it according to either the 50-mile or the 20-mile points system. |
| Williams Grove Speedway (WGS) | 0.500-mile (0.805 km) dirt oval | Counter-Clockwise | Mechanicsburg, Pennsylvania | | Indianapolis Sweepstakes | 1949–1955 (AAA); 1956–1959 (USAC) | Track held only 25-lap non-championship events |
| Monza Circuit (MZN) | 2.641-mile (4.250 km) concrete/paved oval | Clockwise | Monza, Italy | | Race of Two Worlds | 1957–1958 | Monza hosted an international invitational race in which drivers from Formula 1, Champ Car, and other major series competed for prize money. The oval track closed after 1969, the road course still in use by Formula One |
| Fuji Speedway (FUJ) | 2.709-mile (4.360 km) paved road course | Counter-Clockwise | Oyama, Shizuoka, Japan | | Fuji Race | 1966 | Fuji Speedway hosted an international invitational race in which drivers from Formula 1, Champ Car, and other major series competed for prize money. |

== See also ==
- List of Champ Car circuits
- List of motor racing venues by capacity
- Tourist attractions in the United States
- Lists of sports venues
- Lists of stadiums
