= List of sports venues by capacity =

The following is a list of sports venues, ordered by capacity; i.e. the maximum number of spectators the venue can normally accommodate. All venues with a capacity of 40,000 or more are included. Venues that are closed, defunct, or no longer serve as sports venues, are not included. Italics indicate historical regular tenant.

== Sports venues by capacity ==
Venue	Capacity	City	Country	Tenant	Sport	Image
Indianapolis Motor Speedway	400,000	Speedway	United States	NTT IndyCar Series Indianapolis 500, Sonsio Grand Prix, NASCAR Cup Series Brickyard 400, IMSA, Formula One, MotoGP	Motor racing	
Circuit de la Sarthe	234,800	Le Mans	France	24 Hours of Le Mans	Motor racing	
Tokyo Racecourse	223,000	Tokyo	Japan	Japan Cup, Tokyo Yushun, Yasuda Kinen	Horse racing	
Adelaide Street Circuit	210,000	Adelaide	Australia	Supercars Championship, Formula One	Motor racing	
Shanghai International Circuit	200,000	Shanghai	China	Chinese Grand Prix	Motor racing	
Silverstone Circuit	175,000	Silverstone	United Kingdom	British Grand Prix, British motorcycle Grand Prix	Motor racing	
Churchill Downs	170,000	Louisville	United States	Kentucky Derby	Horse racing	
Nakayama Racecourse	165,676	Chiba	Japan	Arima Kinen, Satsuki Sho, Sprinters Stakes, Asahi Hai Futurity Stakes	Horse racing	
Istanbul Park	155,000	Istanbul	Turkey	Formula One, MotoGP	Motor racing	
Suzuka Circuit	155,000	Suzuka	Japan	Japanese Grand Prix, Suzuka 8 Hours, 1000 km Suzuka	Motor racing	
Bristol Motor Speedway	153,000	Bristol	United States	NASCAR Cup Series	Motor racing	
Nürburgring	150,000	Nürburg	Germany	German Grand Prix	Motor racing	
Buddh International Circuit	150,000	Delhi	India	Formula One, FIM Superbike World Championship	Motor racing	
Hanshin Racecourse	139,877	Hyōgo	Japan	Takarazuka Kinen, Japan Cup Dirt, Oka Sho, Hanshin Juvenile Fillies	Horse racing	
Michigan International Speedway	137,243	Brooklyn	United States	NASCAR Cup Series	Motor racing	
Korea International Circuit	135,000	Yeongam	South Korea	Formula One	Motor racing	
Narendra Modi Stadium	132,000	Ahmedabad	India	India, Gujarat cricket team	Cricket	
Flemington Racecourse	130,000	Melbourne	Australia	Melbourne Cup	Horse racing	
Sepang International Circuit	130,000	Sepang	Malaysia	Formula One, MotoGP, Super GT	Motor racing	
Atlanta Motor Speedway	125,000	Hampton	United States	NASCAR Cup Series	Motor racing	
Melbourne Grand Prix Circuit	125,000 (44,000 seating)	Melbourne	Australia	Australian Grand Prix	Motor racing	
Circuit de Nevers Magny-Cours	120,000	Magny-Cours	France	French Grand Prix, Bol d'Or	Motor racing	
EuroSpeedway Lausitz	120,000	Klettwitz	Germany	DTM, SBK	Motor racing	
Hungaroring	120,000	Mogyoród	Hungary	Hungarian Grand Prix	Motor racing	
Kyoto Racecourse	120,000	Kyoto	Japan	Kikuka Sho, Tenno Sho, Shuka Sho, Queen Elizabeth II Commemorative Cup, Mile Championship	Horse racing	
Autódromo José Carlos Pace	119,000	São Paulo	Brazil	Brazilian Grand Prix	Motor racing	
Circuit of the Americas	117,439	Austin	United States	United States Grand Prix, Motorcycle Grand Prix of the Americas	Motor racing	
Las Vegas Motor Speedway	116,000	North Las Vegas	United States	NASCAR Cup Series	Motor racing	
Autodromo Nazionale Monza	115,000	Monza	Italy	Italian Grand Prix	Motor racing	
Rungrado 1st of May Stadium	113,281	Pyongyang	North Korea	Korea DPR national football team	Association football, Athletics	
Texas Motor Speedway	112,662	Fort Worth	United States	NASCAR Cup Series, IndyCar	Motor racing	
Fuji Speedway	110,000	Oyama	Japan	Formula One, Super GT, Super Formula	Motor racing	
Michigan Stadium	107,601	Ann Arbor	United States	Michigan Wolverines football	American football	
Circuit de Catalunya	107,000	Barcelona	Spain	Spanish Grand Prix, Catalan motorcycle Grand Prix	Motor racing	
Beaver Stadium	106,572	State College	United States	Penn State Nittany Lions football	American football	
New Hampshire Motor Speedway	105,491	Loudon	United States	NASCAR Cup Series	Motor racing	
Circuit Park Zandvoort	105,000	Zandvoort	Netherlands	Dutch Grand Prix, DTM	Motor racing	
Ohio Stadium	104,944	Columbus	United States	Ohio State Buckeyes football	American football	
Kyle Field	102,733	College Station	United States	Texas A&M Aggies football	American football	
Neyland Stadium	102,455	Knoxville	United States	Tennessee Volunteers football	American football	
Tiger Stadium	102,321	Baton Rouge	United States	LSU Tigers football	American football	
Sonoma Raceway	102,000	Sonoma	United States	Toyota/Save Mart 350, Grand Prix of Sonoma, Supercuts Superbike Challenge, NHRA Drag Racing Series	Motor racing	
Bryant–Denny Stadium	101,821	Tuscaloosa	United States	Alabama Crimson Tide football	American football	
Sachsenring	101,309	Hohenstein-Ernstthal	Germany	MotoGP	Motor racing	
Daytona International Speedway	101,000	Daytona Beach	United States	Daytona 500, 24 Hours of Daytona, Daytona 200	Motor racing	
Darrell K Royal-Texas Memorial Stadium	100,119	Austin	United States	Texas Longhorns football	American football	
Melbourne Cricket Ground	100,018	Melbourne	Australia	Australia national cricket team, Melbourne Football Club, Richmond Football Club, Collingwood Football Club, Essendon Football Club, Hawthorn Football Club, Carlton Football Club, Victoria cricket team, Melbourne Stars	Australian rules football, Cricket	
Autódromo Hermanos Rodríguez	100,000	Mexico City	Mexico	Mexican Grand Prix, Gran Premio de México	Motor racing	
Autódromo Internacional do Algarve	100,000	Portimão	Portugal	Superleague Formula, GP2 Series	Motor racing	
Circuit Gilles Villeneuve	100,000	Montreal	Canada	Canadian Grand Prix	Motor racing	
Goodwood Circuit	100,000	Chichester	United Kingdom	Goodwood Revival	Motor racing	
Hipódromo de San Isidro	100,000	San Isidro	Argentina	Gran Premio Carlos Pellegrini	Horse racing	
Camp Nou	99,354	Barcelona	Spain	FC Barcelona, 1999 UEFA Champions League Final	Association football	
Pimlico Race Course	98,983	Baltimore	United States	Preakness Stakes, Pimlico Special	Horse racing	
Charlotte Motor Speedway	95,000	Concord	United States	NASCAR Cup Series	Motor racing	
FNB Stadium	94,700	Johannesburg	South Africa	South African national football team, 2010 FIFA World Cup Final	Association football	
Los Angeles Memorial Coliseum	93,607	Los Angeles	United States	USC Trojans football, 2028 Olympic venue	American football, baseball	
Sanford Stadium	92,746	Athens	United States	Georgia Bulldogs football	American football	
Rose Bowl Stadium	92,542	Pasadena	United States	UCLA Bruins football, Rose Bowl, 1994 FIFA World Cup final	American football	
Cotton Bowl Stadium	92,200	Dallas	United States	Red River Shootout, Dallas Trinity FC	American football, soccer	
Memorial Stadium	91,585	Lincoln	United States	Nebraska Cornhuskers football	American football	
Auto Club Speedway	91,200	Fontana	United States	NASCAR Cup Series, MAVTV 500	Motor racing	
Belmont Park	90,000	Elmont	United States	Belmont Stakes	Horse racing	
Circuit de Spa-Francorchamps	90,000	Spa	Belgium	Belgian Grand Prix, MotoGP, Spa 24 Hours	Motor racing	
Donington Park	90,000	Castle Donington	United Kingdom	F3, British motorcycle Grand Prix, BTCC	Motor racing	
Wembley Stadium	90,000	London	United Kingdom	England national football team, FA Cup Final, League Cup Final, Challenge Cup Final	Association football, Rugby league	
Lusail Stadium	88,966	Lusail	Qatar	Qatar national football team, 2022 FIFA World Cup final	Association football	
Ben Hill Griffin Stadium	88,548	Gainesville	US	Florida Gators football	American football	
Estadio Azteca	87,523	Mexico City	Mexico	Club América, Cruz Azul, Mexico national football team, 1970 FIFA World Cup Final, 1986 FIFA World Cup Final	Association football	
Jordan–Hare Stadium	87,451	Auburn	US	Auburn Tigers football	American football	
Bukit Jalil National Stadium	87,411	Kuala Lumpur	Malaysia	Malaysia national football team	Association football	
Borg el-Arab Stadium	86,000	Alexandria	Egypt	Egypt national football team	Association football	
Portland International Raceway	86,000	Portland	US	Grand Prix of Portland	Motor racing	
Estadio Mâs Monumental	85,018	Buenos Aires	Argentina	Argentina national football team, River Plate	Association football	
Santa Anita Park	85,000	Arcadia	US	Santa Anita Derby, Santa Anita Handicap	Horse racing	
Sha Tin Racecourse	85,000	Sha Tin	Hong Kong	Hong Kong Derby, Queen Elizabeth II Cup, Champions Mile, Hong Kong International Races	Horse racing	
Estadio Santiago Bernabéu	84,000	Madrid	Spain	Real Madrid C.F.	Association football	
Accor Stadium	83,500	Sydney	Australia	Canterbury-Bankstown Bulldogs, South Sydney Rabbitohs, Australia national football team, NRL Grand Final	Association football, Rugby league, Rugby union, Cricket, Australian rules football	
MetLife Stadium	82,500	East Rutherford	US	New York Giants, New York Jets, Super Bowl XLVIII	American football, Association football	
Croke Park	82,300	Dublin	Ireland	Gaelic Athletic Association	Gaelic football, Hurling, Camogie, Gaelic handball	
Bobby Bowden Field at Doak Campbell Stadium	82,300	Tallahassee	US	Florida State Seminoles football	American football	
Estádio do Maracanã	82,238	Rio de Janeiro	Brazil	Flamengo, Fluminense, Bangu, América	Association football	
Gaylord Family Oklahoma Memorial Stadium	82,112	Norman	US	Oklahoma Sooners football	American football	
Jakarta International Stadium	82,000	Jakarta	Indonesia	Persija Jakarta	Association football	
Twickenham Stadium	82,000	London	United Kingdom	England national rugby union team, 1991 Rugby World Cup Final, 2015 Rugby World Cup, 2015 Rugby World Cup final	Rugby union	
Kansas Speedway	81,687	Kansas City	US	NASCAR Cup Series	Motor racing	
Signal Iduna Park	81,365	Dortmund	Germany	Borussia Dortmund	Association football	
Stade de France	81,338	Saint-Denis	France	France national football team, France national rugby union team, Stade Français*, UEFA Euro 2016 Final, 1998 FIFA World Cup Final	Rugby union, Association football	
Lambeau Field	81,435	Green Bay	US	Green Bay Packers	American football	
Luzhniki Stadium	81,000	Moscow	Russia	1980 Summer Olympics, 2013 IAAF World Championships, Russia national football team	Association football, Athletics	
Notre Dame Stadium	80,795	Notre Dame	US	Notre Dame Fighting Irish football	American football	
Estadio Monumental	80,593	Lima	Peru	Universitario de Deportes	Association football	
Camp Randall Stadium	80,321	Madison	US	Wisconsin Badgers football	American football	
Memorial Stadium	80,301	Clemson	US	Clemson Tigers football	American football	
Williams-Brice Stadium	80,250	Columbia	US	South Carolina Gamecocks football	American football	
Stadio Giuseppe Meazza	80,065	Milan	Italy	A.C. Milan, F.C. Internazionale Milano	Association football	
Guangdong Olympic Stadium	80,012	Guangzhou	China	2008 Olympics football tournament	Association football	
National Sports Stadium	80,000	Harare	Zimbabwe	Zimbabwe national cricket team	Cricket, Athletics, Association football	
AT&T Stadium	80,000	Arlington	US	Dallas Cowboys	American football	
Hipódromo da Gávea	80,000	Rio de Janeiro	Brazil		Horse racing	
Stade des Martyrs	80,000	Kinshasa	(Democratic Republic of the Congo) Dem. R. of Congo	Congo DR national football team	Association football	
Beijing National Stadium	80,000	Beijing	China	2008 Summer Olympics, 2015 World Championships in Athletics	Athletics, Association football	
Stade Tata Raphaël	80,000	Kinshasa	(Democratic Republic of the Congo) Dem. R. of Congo	AS Vita Club, DC Motema Pembe	Association football	
Salpausselkä skiing stadium	80,000	Lahti	Finland	Lahden Hiihtoseura, FIS Ski Jumping World Cup	Ski jumping	
Arrowhead Stadium	79,451	Kansas City	US	Kansas City Chiefs	American football	
Azadi Stadium	78,116	Tehran	Iran	Iran national football team, Persepolis, Esteghlal	Association football	
Talladega Superspeedway	78,000	Talladega	US	NASCAR Cup Series, ARCA	Motor racing	
Gelora Bung Karno Stadium	77,193	Jakarta	Indonesia	Indonesia national football team	Association football	
Pocono Raceway	76,812	Long Pond	US	NASCAR Cup Series, Pocono 500	Motor racing	
Phoenix International Raceway	76,800	Avondale	US	NASCAR Cup Series, Phoenix Grand Prix	Motor racing	
Empower Field at Mile High	76,125	Denver	US	Denver Broncos, Denver Outlaws	American football, Lacrosse	
Donald W. Reynolds Razorback Stadium	76,000	Fayetteville	US	Arkansas Razorbacks football	American football	
Old Trafford	75,957	Manchester	United Kingdom	Manchester United F.C., Super League Grand Final	Association football, Rugby league	
Ibn Batouta Stadium	75,600	Tangier	Morocco	IR Tanger	Association football	
Atatürk Olympic Stadium	75,486	Istanbul	Turkey	Turkey national football team	Association football	
Spartan Stadium	75,025	East Lansing	US	Michigan State Spartans	American football	
Aintree Racecourse	75,000	Liverpool	United Kingdom	Grand National	Horse racing	
Chicagoland Speedway	75,000	Joliet	US	NASCAR Cup Series	Motor racing	
Mid-Ohio Sports Car Course	75,000	Lexington	US	IndyCar, NASCAR Xfinity Series	Motor racing	
Niigata Racecourse	75,000	Niigata	Japan		Horse racing	
Millennium Stadium	74,500	Cardiff	United Kingdom	Wales national rugby union team	Rugby union	
Olympiastadion	74,228	Berlin	Germany	Hertha BSC Berlin, 1936 Summer Olympics, 2009 World Championships in Athletics	Association football	
Cairo International Stadium	74,100	Cairo	Egypt	Egypt national football team, Al-Ahly, El Zamalek	Association football	
Highmark Stadium	73,967	Orchard Park	US	Buffalo Bills	American football	
Bank of America Stadium	73,298	Charlotte	US	Carolina Panthers, Duke's Mayo Bowl	American football	
U.S. Bank Stadium	73,000	Minneapolis	US	Minnesota Vikings	American football	
Stadio Olimpico	72,698	Rome	Italy	A.S. Roma, S.S. Lazio	Association football, Athletics, Rugby Union	
Husky Stadium	72,500	Seattle	US	Washington Huskies football	American football	
International Stadium Yokohama	72,327	Yokohama	Japan	Yokohama F. Marinos	Association football	
Caesars Superdome	72,003	New Orleans	US	New Orleans Saints, Sugar Bowl, New Orleans Bowl, Bayou Classic (Grambling vs. Southern football)	American football, Association football, Baseball	
NRG Stadium	72,000	Houston	US	Houston Texans, Texas Bowl	American football	
Shanghai Stadium	72,000	Shanghai	China	Shanghai Shenhua*	Association football	
California Memorial Stadium	71,799	Berkeley	US	California Golden Bears football	American football	
Legion Field	71,594	Birmingham	US	UAB Blazers football, Papajohns.com Bowl	American football	
Athens Olympic Stadium	71,030	Athens	Greece	Panathinaikos, 2004 Summer Olympics, 2007 UEFA Champions League Final, 1997 World Championships in Athletics	Association football	
Kinnick Stadium	70,585	Iowa City	US	Iowa Hawkeyes football	American football	
Cívitas Metropolitano	70,460	Madrid	ESP	Atlético de Madrid	Association football	
SoFi Stadium	70,240	Inglewood	US	Los Angeles Chargers, Los Angeles Rams, LA Bowl	American football	
M&T Bank Stadium	70,107	Baltimore	US	Baltimore Ravens	American football	
Olimpiyskiy	70,050	Kyiv	Ukraine	Ukraine national football team, Dynamo Kyiv	Association football	
Ascot Racecourse	70,000	Ascot	United Kingdom	Royal Ascot, King George VI and Queen Elizabeth Stakes	Horse racing	
Hockenheimring	70,000	Hockenheim	Germany	Formula One, DTM	Motor racing	
Yadegar-e-Emam Stadium	70,000	Tabriz	Iran	Teraktor Sazi	Association football	
Rice Stadium	70,000	Houston	US	Rice Owls football	American football	
Phnom Penh National Olympic Stadium	70,000	Phnom Penh	Cambodia	Khemara	Association football	
Seoul Olympic Stadium	69,950	Seoul	South Korea	1986 Asian Games, 1988 Summer Olympics	Athletics, Association football	
Arena BRB Mané Garrincha	69,910	Brasília	Brazil	Sociedade Esportiva do Gama*	Association football	
Prince Moulay Abdellah Stadium	69,500	Rabat	Morocco	AS FAR	Association football	
Shah Alam Stadium	69,372	Shah Alam	Malaysia	Selangor FA	Association football	
Munich Olympiastadion	69,250	Munich	Germany	1972 Summer Olympics	Athletics	
Al Bayt Stadium	68,895	Al Khor	Qatar		Association football	
Nissan Stadium	68,804	Nashville	US	Tennessee Titans, Tennessee State Tigers football, Music City Bowl	American football	
Gillette Stadium	68,756	Foxborough	US	New England Patriots, New England Revolution	American football, Association football	
Lumen Field	68,740	Seattle	US	Seattle Seahawks, Seattle Sounders FC	American football, Association football	
Lincoln Financial Field	68,532	Philadelphia	US	Philadelphia Eagles, Temple Owls football	American football	
Levi's Stadium	68,500	Santa Clara, California	US	San Francisco 49ers	American football	
Acrisure Stadium	68,400	Pittsburgh	US	Pittsburgh Steelers, Pittsburgh Panthers football, WPIAL high school football championship games	American football	
Faurot Field	68,349	Columbia	US	Missouri Tigers football	American football	
Twin Ring Motegi	68,156	Motegi	Japan	Moto GP	Motor racing	
Workers Stadium	68,000	Beijing	China	Beijing Guoan	Association football	
Salt Lake Stadium	68,000	Kolkata	India	Mohun Bagan Super Giant, East Bengal FC	Association football, Athletics	
EverBank Stadium	67,814	Jacksonville	US	Jacksonville Jaguars	American football	
Gazprom Arena	67,431	Saint Petersburg	RUS	FC Zenit	Association football	
Commonwealth Stadium	67,606	Lexington	US	Kentucky Wildcats football	American football	
Cheltenham Racecourse	67,500	Cheltenham	United Kingdom	Cheltenham Festival	Horse racing	
Cleveland Browns Stadium	67,431	Cleveland	US	Cleveland Browns	American football	
MorumBIS	67,428	São Paulo	Brazil	São Paulo FC	Association football	
Orange Vélodrome	67,394	Marseille	France	Olympique de Marseille	Association football	
Murrayfield Stadium	67,144	Edinburgh	United Kingdom	Scotland national rugby union team	Rugby union	
King Fahd International Stadium	67,000	Riyadh	Saudi Arabia	Al-Hilal, Al Shabab	Association football	
The Dome at America's Center	66,965	St. Louis	US		American football	
Eden Gardens	66,349	Kolkata	India	Kolkata Knight Riders, Bengal cricket team, Indian national cricket team	Cricket	
Lane Stadium	66,233	Blacksburg	US	Virginia Tech Hokies football	American football	
Olympic Stadium	66,308	Montreal	Canada	1976 Summer Olympics, Montreal Alouettes, CF Montréal	Canadian football, Baseball, Association football	
Seoul World Cup Stadium	66,080	Seoul	South Korea	Korea Republic national football team, FC Seoul, 2002 FIFA World Cup	Association football	
Allianz Arena	74,000	Munich	Germany	Bayern Munich, 1860 Munich	Association football	
Kentucky Speedway	66,000	Sparta	US	NASCAR Cup Series Series, NASCAR Xfinity Series	Motor racing	
Stade 5 Juillet 1962	66,000	Algiers	Algeria	MC Algiers	Association football	
Raymond James Stadium	65,847	Tampa	US	Tampa Bay Buccaneers, South Florida Bulls football, Outback Bowl	American football	
Daegu Stadium	65,754	Daegu	South Korea	2002 FIFA World Cup, 2011 World Championships in Athletics	Athletics, Association football	
Estádio da Luz	65,647	Lisbon	Portugal	Benfica	Association football	
Paycor Stadium	65,535	Cincinnati	US	Cincinnati Bengals	American football	
Alamodome	65,000	San Antonio	US	Alamo Bowl	American football	
Allegiant Stadium	65,000	Las Vegas	US	Las Vegas Raiders, UNLV Rebels	American football	
Darlington Raceway	65,000	Darlington	US	NASCAR Cup Series	Motor racing	
Estadio Centenario	65,000	Montevideo	Uruguay	Uruguay national football team,	Association football	
Ford Field	65,000	Detroit	US	Detroit Lions, Motor City Bowl	American football	
World Wide Technology Raceway at Gateway	65,000	Madison	US	NTT INDYCAR Series, NASCAR Camping World Truck Series	Motor racing	
Camping World Stadium	65,000	Orlando	US	Jones High School, Orlando, Capital One Bowl, Champs Sports Bowl, Florida Classic	American football	
Homestead-Miami Speedway	65,000	Homestead	US	NASCAR Cup Series	Motor racing	
Jaber Al-Ahmad International Stadium	65,000	Kuwait City	Kuwait	Kuwait national football team	Association football	
June 11 Stadium	65,000	Tripoli	Libya	Libya national football team, Al-Ahly, Al-Ittihad, Al Madina Tripoli	Association football	
Kamuzu Stadium	65,000	Blantyre	Malawi	Malawi national football team	Association football	
Martinsville Speedway	65,000	Martinsville	US	NASCAR Cup Series	Motor racing	
Shaheed Veer Narayan Singh International Cricket Stadium	65,000	Nava Raipur	India	India, Chhattisgarh, Delhi Daredevils	Cricket	
Stade 7 November	65,000	Radès	Tunisia	Tunisia national football team	Association football	
Hard Rock Stadium	64,767	Miami	US	Miami Dolphins, Miami Hurricanes football, Orange Bowl, Florida Marlins	American football, Baseball	
Yale Bowl	64,269	New Haven	US	Yale University Bulldogs	American football	
LaVell Edwards Stadium	64,045	Provo	US	Brigham Young University Cougars football	American football	
Saitama Stadium	63,700	Saitama	Japan	Urawa Red Diamonds	Association football	
State Farm Stadium	63,400	Glendale	US	Arizona Cardinals, Fiesta Bowl	American football	
Estadio Olímpico Universitario	63,186	Mexico City	Mexico	Club Universidad Nacional, Pumas Dorados de la UNAM	Association football	
Oakland–Alameda County Coliseum	63,026	Oakland	US	Oakland Athletics, Oakland Roots SC, Oakland Soul SC	Association football, Baseball	
Lucas Oil Stadium	63,000	Indianapolis	US	Indianapolis Colts	American football, Basketball	
Memorial Stadium	62,872	Champaign	US	Illinois Fighting Illini football	American football	
Tottenham Hotspur Stadium	62,850	London	United Kingdom	Tottenham Hotspur	Association football	
Ellis Park Stadium	62,567	Johannesburg	South Africa	Golden Lions, Lions	Rugby union, Association football	
London Stadium	62,500	London	United Kingdom	West Ham United F.C., London Athletics Meet	Association football, Athletics	
Ross–Ade Stadium	62,500	West Lafayette	US	Purdue Boilermakers football	American football	
Simmons Bank Liberty Stadium	62,380	Memphis	US	Memphis Tigers football, Liberty Bowl	American football	
Veltins-Arena	62,271	Gelsenkirchen	Germany	FC Schalke 04	Association football	
Yizhong Center	62,000	Qingdao	China	Qingdao Hainiu	Association football	
Mineirão	61,927	Belo Horizonte	Brazil	Cruzeiro Esporte Clube, Clube Atlético Mineiro	Association football	
Jack Trice Stadium	61,500	Ames	US	Iowa State Cyclones football	American football	
Scott Stadium	61,500	Charlottesville	US	Virginia Cavaliers football	American football	
Soldier Field	61,500	Chicago	US	Chicago Bears, Chicago Fire FC	American football, association football	
Davis Wade Stadium	61,337	Starkville	US	Mississippi State Bulldogs football	American football	
Anfield	61,276	Liverpool	United Kingdom	Liverpool F.C.	Association football	
Jones AT&T Stadium	61,000	Lubbock	US	Texas Tech Red Raiders football	American football	
L&N Federal Credit Union Stadium	60,800	Louisville	US	Louisville Cardinals football	American football	
Benito Villamarín	60,720	Seville	Spain	Real Betis	Association football	
Emirates Stadium	60,704	London	United Kingdom	Arsenal F.C.	Association football	
Vaught–Hemingway Stadium	64,038	Oxford	US	Ole Miss Rebels football	American football	
Mountaineer Field at Milan Puskar Stadium	60,540	Morgantown	US	West Virginia Mountaineers football	American football	
Mississippi Veterans Memorial Stadium	60,492	Jackson	US	Jackson State Tigers	American football	
MHPArena	60,441	Stuttgart	Germany	VfB Stuttgart	Association football	
Celtic Park	60,411	Glasgow	United Kingdom	Celtic FC	Association football	
Rockingham Speedway	60,113	Rockingham	US	ARCA Re/Max Series, American 200	Motor racing	
Commonwealth Stadium	60,081	Edmonton	Canada	Edmonton Elks, Edmonton Huskies, Edmonton Wildcats, Edmonton Drillers	Canadian football, Association football, Rugby union, Athletics	
Estádio do Arruda	60,044	Recife	Brazil	Santa Cruz Futebol Clube	Association football	
Stade Alassane Ouattara	60,012	Abidjan	Ivory Coast	Ivory Coast national football team	Association football	
Morodok Techo National Stadium	60,000	Phnom Penh	Cambodia	Cambodia national football team	Association football	
Naghsh-e-Jahan Stadium	60,000	Esfahān	Iran	Sepahan F.C.	Association football	
Perth Stadium	60,000	Perth	Australia	West Coast Eagles, Fremantle Dockers, Cricket Australia, Perth Scorchers	Australian rules football, Cricket	
Stade omnisport Paul Biya	60,000	Yaoundé	Cameroon	Cameroon national football team	Association football	
Stade Municipal de Kintélé	60,000	Brazzaville	Republic of the Congo	Congo national football team	Association football	
UNSA Stadium	60,000	Arequipa	Peru	Melgar	Association football	
Abuja Stadium	60,000	Abuja	Nigeria	Nigeria national football team	Association football	
Autodromo Enzo e Dino Ferrari	60,000	Imola	Italy	Formula One	Motor racing	
Circuit de Valencia	60,000	Cheste	Spain	MotoGP	Motor racing	
Circuito de Jerez	60,000	Jerez de la Frontera	Spain	Formula One, European Grand Prix, Spanish motorcycle Grand Prix	Motor racing	
Mogadishu Stadium	60,000	Mogadishu	Somalia	Somalia national football team	Association football	
Jawaharlal Nehru Stadium	60,000	Delhi	India	2010 Commonwealth Games	Athletics	
Hamilton Park Racecourse	60,000	Hamilton	United Kingdom	Glasgow Stakes	Horse racing	
Tanzania National Main Stadium	60,000	Dar es Salaam	Tanzania	Tanzania national football team, Simba SC, Young Africans	Association football	
Arena Fonte Nova	60,000	Salvador	Brazil	Esporte Clube Bahia	Association football	
Meydan Racecourse	60,000	Dubai Meydan City	United Arab Emirates	Dubai World Cup Night	Horse racing	
Nanjing Olympic Sports Center	60,000	Nanjing	China	local football teams	Association football	
Odi Stadium	60,000	Mabopane	South Africa	Garankuwa United	Association football	
Phakisa Freeway	60,000	Welkom	South Africa	MotoGP	Motor racing	
Shenyang Olympic Sports Centre Stadium	60,000	Shenyang	China		Association football	
Tianhe Stadium	60,000	Guangzhou	China		Association football	
TT Circuit Assen	60,000	Assen	Netherlands	MotoGP	Motor racing	
Boone Pickens Stadium	60,000	Stillwater	US	Oklahoma State Cowboys football	American football	
Jinan Olympic Sports Center Stadium	60,000	Jinan	China	local football teams	Association football	
Hefei Olympic Sports Center Stadium	60,000	Hefei	China		Association football	
Harbin Sports City Center Stadium	60,000	Harbin	China	local football teams	Association football	
Vincennes Racecourse	60,000	Paris	France		Horse racing	
Estadio Monumental Isidro Romero Carbo	59,283	Guayaquil	Ecuador	Barcelona Sporting Club	Association football	
Groupama Stadium	59,186	Lyon	France		Association football	
Chongqing Olympic Sports Center	58,680	Chongqing	China		Association football	
Dover International Speedway	58,500	Dover	US	NASCAR Cup Series	Motor racing	
Castelão	58,400	Fortaleza	Brazil	Ceará, Fortaleza	Association football	
Chukyo Racecourse	58,400	Toyoake	Japan	Takamatsunomiya Kinen	Horse racing	
Cape Town Stadium	58,310	Cape Town	South Africa	2010 FIFA World Cup, Cape Town City FC, Stormers, Western Province	Association football	
Estádio Beira-Rio	58,306	Porto Alegre	Brazil	Sport Club Internacional	Association football	
Stadio San Nicola	58,248	Bari	Italy	A.S. Bari	Association football	
Stadion Narodowy	58,145	Warsaw	Poland	Poland national football team*, *	Association football	
İzmir Atatürk Stadyumu	58,008	İzmir	Turkey	Altay S.K.*, Göztepe A.Ş.*	Association football	
Commanders Field	58,000	Landover	US	Washington Commanders	American football	
Deutsche Bank Park	58,000	Frankfurt	Germany	Eintracht Frankfurt	Association football	
Mount Panorama	57,939	Bathurst	Australia	Bathurst 1000, Supercars Championship, Intercontinental GT Challenge	Motor racing	
Estadio La Cartuja de Sevilla	57,619	Seville	Spain	Spain national football team*	Association football	
Carter–Finley Stadium	57,583	Raleigh	US	NC State Wolfpack football	American football	
Estadio Alberto J. Armando	57,200	Buenos Aires	Argentina	Club Atlético Boca Juniors	Association football	
Estadio Jalisco	56,713	Guadalajara	Mexico	Club Deportivo Guadalajara, Club Atlas	Association football	
Marvel Stadium	56,347	Melbourne	Australia	Western Bulldogs, St Kilda Saints, Carlton Blues, Essendon Bombers, Melbourne Renegades	Australian rules football, Association football, Cricket, Rugby union	
Dodger Stadium	56,000	Los Angeles	US	Los Angeles Dodgers	Baseball	
Stade 19 Mai 1956	56,000	Annaba	Algeria	USM Annaba	Association football	
York Racecourse	56,000	York	United Kingdom	Ebor Festival	Horse racing	
Estadi Olímpic Lluís Companys	55,926	Barcelona	Spain	1992 Summer Olympics, 2010 European Athletics Championships	Athletics	
Arena Națională	55,634	Bucharest	Romania	Romanian national football team, FCSB	Association football	
Moses Mabhida Stadium	55,500	Durban	South Africa	2010 FIFA World Cup	Association football	
City of Manchester Stadium	55,057	Manchester	United Kingdom	2002 Commonwealth Games, Manchester City F.C., 2008 UEFA Cup Final	Association football	
Rajiv Gandhi International Cricket Stadium	55,000	Hyderabad	India	Sunrisers Hyderabad	Cricket	
Kasarani Stadium	55,000	Nairobi	Kenya	Kenya national football team	Association football	
Kings Park Stadium	55,000	Durban	South Africa	Sharks, Sharks (Currie Cup), Golden Arrows, AmaZulu	Rugby union, Association football	
Bobby Dodd Stadium	55,000	Atlanta	US	Georgia Tech Yellow Jackets football	American football	
Estadio Latinoamericano	55,000	Havana	Cuba	Industriales, Metropolitanos	Baseball	
Happy Valley Racecourse	55,000	Happy Valley	Hong Kong	Hong Kong International Races	Horse racing	
He Long Sports Centre Stadium	55,000	Changsha	China	local football teams	Association football	
Holmenkollen ski jump	55,000	Oslo	Norway	Holmenkollen ski festival, FIS Nordic World Ski Championships	Ski jumping	
Semple Stadium	55,000	Thurles	Ireland	Tipperary GAA	Hurling, Gaelic football	
Singapore National Stadium	55,000	Kallang	Singapore	Singapore national football team	Association football	
National Stadium	55,000	Kaohsiung	Taiwan		Association football	
Philippine Arena	55,000	Ciudad de Victoria	Philippines	Philippine Basketball Association, Philippines men's national basketball team, 2019 Southeast Asian Games, 2023 FIBA Basketball World Cup	Basketball	
Johan Cruyff Arena	54,990	Amsterdam	Netherlands	AFC Ajax	Association football	
Stadio Diego Armando Maradona	54,726	Naples	Italy	SSC Napoli	Association football	
Tianjin Olympic Centre Stadium	54,696	Tianjin	China	local football teams, 2008 Summer Olympics football tournament	Association football	
Boris Paichadze Stadium	54,549	Tbilisi	Georgia	FC Dinamo Tbilisi, Georgia national football team, Georgia national rugby union team	Association football, Rugby union	
BC Place	54,405	Vancouver	Canada	BC Lions, Vancouver Whitecaps FC	Canadian football, Association football	
Estádio Serra Dourada	54,048	Goiânia	Brazil	Goiás Esporte Clube*, Vila Nova Futebol Clube*	Association football	
SECU Stadium	54,000	College Park	US	Maryland Terrapins football	American football	
Wuhan Stadium	54,000	Wuhan	China		Association football	
Stadion Crvena Zvezda	54,000	Belgrade	Serbia	Red Star Belgrade	Association football	
Autzen Stadium	54,000	Eugene	US	Oregon Ducks football	American football	
Busan Asiad Stadium	53,864	Busan	South Korea	Busan IPark, 2002 FIFA World Cup, 2002 Asian Games	Association football	
Folsom Field	53,750	Boulder	US	Colorado Buffaloes football	American football	
War Memorial Stadium	53,727	Little Rock	US	Arkansas Razorbacks football	American football	
Estadio Único Diego Armando Maradona	53,600	La Plata	Argentina	Club de Gimnasia y Esgrima La Plata (some games), Estudiantes de La Plata (some games)	Association football	
Mountain America Stadium	53,599	Tempe	US	Arizona State Sun Devils	American football	
Adelaide Oval	53,500	Adelaide	Australia	Adelaide Crows, Port Adelaide Power, Cricket Australia, Southern Redbacks, Adelaide Strikers	Australian rules football, Cricket	
San Mamés	53,331	Bilbao	Spain	Athletic Bilbao	Association football	
Aleppo International Stadium	53,200	Aleppo	Syria	Al-Ittihad	Association football	
Estadio Atanasio Girardot	52,872	Medellín	Colombia	Atlético Nacional, Independiente Medellín	Association football	
Hill Dickinson Stadium	52,769	Liverpool	United Kingdom	Everton F.C.	Association football	
Memorial Stadium	52,692	Bloomington	US	Indiana Hoosiers football	American football	
Rams Park	52,625	Istanbul	TUR	Galatasaray	Association football	
Franklin Field	52,593	Philadelphia	US	Penn Quakers football	American football, Athletics	
Şükrü Saracoğlu Stadium	52,530	Istanbul	Turkey	Fenerbahçe	Association football	
Huntington Bank Stadium	52,525	Minneapolis	US	Minnesota Golden Gophers football	American football	
Suncorp Stadium	52,500	Brisbane	Australia	Queensland Reds, Brisbane Broncos, Australia national rugby league team	Rugby union, Association football, Rugby league	
Falcon Stadium	52,480	Colorado Springs	US	Air Force Falcons football	American football	
Estadio Mestalla	52,469	Valencia	Spain	Valencia CF	Association football	
SHI Stadium	52,454	Piscataway	US	Rutgers Scarlet Knights football	American football	
St James' Park	52,387	Newcastle upon Tyne	United Kingdom	Newcastle United F.C.	Association football	
Yankee Stadium	52,325	New York City	US	New York Yankees, NYCFC	Association football, Baseball	
Bill Snyder Family Football Stadium	52,200	Manhattan	US	Kansas State Wildcats football	American football	
Rockingham Motor Speedway	52,000	Corby	United Kingdom	British Touring Car Championship	Motor racing	
Estadio Deportivo Cali	52,000	Cali	Colombia	Deportivo Cali	Association football	
Hampden Park	51,866	Glasgow	United Kingdom	Scotland national football team, Queen's Park F.C., 2014 Commonwealth Games	Association football	
Estadio Monumental de Maturín	51,796	Maturín	Venezuela	Monagas Sport Club	Association football	
Loftus Versfeld Stadium	51,762	Pretoria	South Africa	Bulls, Blue Bulls, South Africa national rugby union team, Supersport United FC*	Rugby union, Cricket, Association football	
Ibrox Stadium	51,700	Glasgow	United Kingdom	Rangers F.C.	Association football	
Hohhot City Stadium	51,632	Hohhot	China	local football teams	Association football	
De Kuip	51,577	Rotterdam	Netherlands	Feyenoord	Association football	
Rajamangala Stadium	51,552	Bangkok	Thailand	Thailand national football team	Association football	
Kumasi Sports Stadium	51,500	Kumasi	Ghana	Asante Kotoko, King Faisal Babes	Association football	
Merkur Spiel-Arena	51,500	Düsseldorf	Germany	Fortuna Düsseldorf	Association football	
Sun Bowl Stadium	51,500	El Paso	US	UTEP Miners football, Sun Bowl	American football	
Volksparkstadion	51,500	Hamburg	Germany	Hamburger SV	Association football	
Rice-Eccles Stadium	51,444	Salt Lake City	US	Utah Utes football	American football	
Shizuoka Stadium	51,349	Fukuroi	Japan	Júbilo Iwata*, Shimizu S-Pulse*	Association football	
Aviva Stadium	51,711	Dublin	Ireland	Ireland national rugby union team, Republic of Ireland national football team	Rugby union, Association football	
Huanglong Stadium	51,139	Hangzhou	China	Zhejiang Professional	Association football	
Newlands Stadium	51,100	Cape Town	South Africa		Rugby union, Association football	
Richmond International Raceway	51,000	Richmond	US	NASCAR Cup Series	Motor racing	
Hrazdan Stadium	51,000	Yerevan	Armenia	FC Ararat Yerevan, FC Kilikia Yerevan	Association football	
Independence Stadium	50,832	Shreveport	US	Independence Bowl	American football	
Arizona Stadium	50,782	Tucson	US	Arizona Wildcats football	American football	
Rogers Centre	50,598	Toronto	Canada	Toronto Blue Jays, Toronto Argonauts, Buffalo Bills*	Baseball, Canadian football, American football	
Kenan Memorial Stadium	50,500	Chapel Hill	US	North Carolina Tar Heels football	American football	
Estádio do Dragão	50,476	Porto	Portugal	F.C. Porto	Association football	
Estádio José Alvalade	50,466	Lisbon	Portugal	Sporting Clube de Portugal	Association football	
Coors Field	50,445	Denver	US	Colorado Rockies	Baseball	
Incheon Munhak Stadium	50,256	Incheon	South Korea	Incheon Korail, 2002 FIFA World Cup	Association football	
Stade Pierre-Mauroy	50,186	Lille	France	LOSC	Association football	
Donbas Arena	50,149	Donetsk	Ukraine	Shaktar Donetsk	Association football	
Ajinomoto Stadium	50,100	Tokyo	Japan	FC Tokyo, Tokyo Verdy	Association football	
Memorial Stadium	50,071	Lawrence	US	Kansas Jayhawks football	American football	
King Baudouin Stadium	50,024	Brussels	Belgium	Belgium national football team	Association football	
MotorMall Wanneroo Raceway	50,000	Perth	Australia	V8 Supercars	Motor Racing	
Diamniadio Olympic Stadium	50,000	Dakar	Senegal	Senegal national football team	Association football	
Stade de Japoma	50,000	Douala	Cameroon	Cameroon national football team	Association football	
Letalnica bratov Gorišek	50,000	Planica	Slovenia	FIS Ski Flying World Cup, FIS Ski-Flying World Championships	Ski flying	
Čerťák-Adidas Arena	50,000	Harrachov	Czech Republic	FIS Ski Flying World Cup, FIS Ski-Flying World Championships	Ski flying	
Wielka Krokiew	50,000	Zakopane	Poland	TS Wisła Zakopane, FIS Ski Jumping World Cup	Ski jumping	
Lysgårdsbakken	50,000	Lillehammer	Norway	1994 Winter Olympics, FIS Ski Jumping World Cup	Ski jumping	
Estádio Parque do Sabiá	50,000	Uberlândia	Brazil	Uberlândia Esporte Clube	Association football	
EMS Stadium	50,000	Kozhikode	India	Gokulam Kerala FC	Association football, Cricket	
Brabourne Stadium	50,000	Mumbai	India	Cricket Club of India, Mumbai cricket team, Mumbai women's cricket team	Cricket	
KD Singh Babu Stadium	50,000	Lucknow	India		Cricket, field hockey, association football	
Kim Il-sung Stadium	50,000	Pyongyang	North Korea	Pyongyang City Sports Group	Association football	
Bahrain International Circuit	50,000	Sakhir	Bahrain	Formula One	Motor racing	
Club Hipico de Santiago	50,000	Santiago	Chile	Premio El Ensayo, Chilean Oaks, Polla de Potrillos, Polla de Potrancas	Horse racing	
Croft Circuit	50,000	Dalton-on-Tees	United Kingdom	British Touring Car Championship	Motor racing	
Fukushima Racecourse	50,000	Fukushima	Japan		Horse racing	
Gaelic Grounds	50,000	Limerick	Ireland	Limerick GAA	Hurling, Gaelic football	
Hipodromo Argentino de Palermo	50,000	Buenos Aires	Argentina		Horse racing	
Horner Rennbahn	50,000	Hamburg	Germany	Deutsches Derby	Horse racing	
Khalifa International Stadium	50,000	Doha	Qatar	Qatar national football team	Association football	
Longchamp Racecourse	50,000	Paris	France	Prix de l'Arc de Triomphe	Horse racing	
Milwaukee Mile	50,000	West Allis	US	Verizon IndyCar Series	Motor racing	
Mugello Circuit	50,000	Mugello	Italy	Italian motorcycle Grand Prix, DTM, SBK, F3	Motor racing	
Nagai Stadium	50,000	Osaka	Japan	Cerezo Osaka	Association football, Athletics	
Nashville Superspeedway	50,000	Gladeville	US	Closed in 2011	Motor racing	
Sanair Super Speedway	50,000	Saint-Pie	Canada	Grand Prix of Montreal, Truck racing, Drag racing	Motor racing	
Sapporo Racecourse	50,000	Sapporo	Japan	Sapporo Kinen	Horse racing	
Saratoga Race Course	50,000	Saratoga Springs	US	Travers Stakes, Whitney Handicap, Alabama Stakes, Woodward Stakes	Horse racing	
Stade 26 mars	50,000	Bamako	Mali	Stade Malien	Association football	
Stanford Stadium	50,000	Stanford	US	Stanford Cardinal football	American football	
Sultan Mizan Zainal Abidin Stadium	50,000	Kuala Terengganu	Malaysia	Terengganu FA*	Association football, Athletics	
Pars Shiraz Stadium	50,000	Shiraz	Iran		Association football	
Henan Provincial Stadium	50,000	Zhengzhou	China	local football teams	Association football	
Xinjiang Sports Centre	50,000	Ürümqi	China	local football teams	Association football	
Yas Marina Circuit	50,000	Yas Island	United Arab Emirates	Formula One	Motor racing	
Estádio 11 de Novembro	50,000	Luanda	Angola	2010 Africa Cup of Nations	Association football	
Guangzhou University City Stadium	50,000	Guangzhou	China	local football teams	Association football	
Chang International Circuit	50,000	Buriram	Thailand	Superbike World Championship, World Touring Car Championship, Super GT	Motor racing	
Dowdy–Ficklen Stadium	50,000	Greenville	US	East Carolina Pirates football	American football	
Eden Park	50,000	Auckland	New Zealand	Blues, Auckland RFU, Auckland Aces	Rugby union, Cricket	
Yashwant Stadium	50,000	Nagpur	India		Association football	
Ernst-Happel-Stadion	49,844	Vienna	Austria	Austria national football team, FK Austria Wien*, SK Rapid Wien*	Association football	
Estadio José Amalfitani	49,540	Buenos Aires	Argentina	Club Atlético Vélez Sársfield, Argentina national rugby union team	Association football, Rugby union	
Ryan Field	49,256	Evanston	US	Northwestern Wildcats football	American football	
JMA Wireless Dome	49,250	Syracuse	US	Syracuse Orange football, Syracuse Orange men's basketball, Syracuse Orange men's lacrosse, Syracuse Orange women's basketball, Syracuse Orange women's lacrosse	American football, Basketball, Lacrosse	
Miyagi Stadium	49,133	Rifu	Japan	Vegalta Sendai*	Association football, Athletics	
Chase Field	49,033	Phoenix	US	Arizona Diamondbacks	Baseball	
Stadium of Light	49,000	Sunderland	United Kingdom	Sunderland A.F.C.	Association football	
Queensland Sport and Athletics Centre Stadium	49,000	Brisbane	Australia	Queensland State of Origin, Brisbane Broncos	Rugby league	
Oriole Park at Camden Yards	48,876	Baltimore	US	Baltimore Orioles	Baseball	
Jinnah Sports Stadium	48,800	Islamabad	Pakistan	Pakistan national football team *	Association football, Cricket, Field hockey	
Camille Chamoun Sports City Stadium	48,800	Beirut	Lebanon	Lebanon national football team	Association football	
Fritz-Walter-Stadion	48,500	Kaiserslautern	Germany	1. FC Kaiserslautern	Association football	
Estadio Tomás Adolfo Ducó	48,314	Buenos Aires	Argentina	Club Atlético Huracán	Association football	
Nelson Mandela Bay Stadium	48,000	Port Elizabeth	South Africa	Southern Kings	Rugby union, Association football	
Estadio Malvinas Argentinas	48,000	Mendoza	Argentina	Godoy Cruz Antonio Tomba	Association football	
Fukuoka PayPay Dome	48,000	Fukuoka	Japan	Fukuoka SoftBank Hawks	Baseball	
Kyocera Dome Osaka	48,000	Osaka	Japan	Orix Buffaloes*	Baseball	
Sydney Cricket Ground	48,000	Sydney	Australia	New South Wales Blues, Sydney Swans	Cricket, Australian rules football, Rugby union, Rugby league	
Koshien Stadium	47,400	Nishinomiya	Japan	Hanshin Tigers, National High School Baseball Invitational Tournament	Baseball	
Stadio Artemio Franchi	47,282	Florence	Italy	ACF Fiorentina	Association football	
Neo Química Arena	47,252	São Paulo	Brazil	Sport Club Corinthians Paulista	Association football	
Stadion Śląski	47,246	Chorzów	Poland	Poland national football team	Association football, Motor racing, Athletics	
T-Mobile Park	47,116	Seattle	US	Seattle Mariners	Baseball	
Protective Stadium	47,100	Birmingham	US	Birmingham Legion FC, Birmingham Stallions, UAB Blazers	American football, Association football	
Red Bull Arena	47,069	Leipzig	Germany	RB Leipzig	Association football	
Estadio Monumental David Arellano	47,017	Santiago	Chile	Colo-Colo	Association football	
Busch Stadium	46,861	St. Louis	US	St. Louis Cardinals	Baseball	
Caulfield Racecourse	46,800	Melbourne	Australia	Caulfield Cup, Caulfield Guineas, Blue Diamond Stakes, C F Orr Stakes, Oakleigh Plate, Underwood Stakes	Horse racing	
Estadio Metropolitano	46,692	Barranquilla	Colombia	Atlético Junior	Association football	
Parc des Princes	46,480	Paris	France	Paris Saint-Germain F.C.	Association football	
Borussia-Park	46,249	Mönchengladbach	Germany	Borussia Mönchengladbach	Association football	
Estadio Nacional de Chile	46,190	Santiago	Chile	Chile national football team	Association football, Athletics	
RheinEnergieStadion	46,134	Cologne	Germany	1. FC Köln	Association football	
Estadio Mario Alberto Kempes	46,083	Córdoba	Argentina		Association football	
Estadio El Campín	46,018	Bogotá	Colombia	Colombia national football team, Millonarios, Independiente Santa Fe	Association football	
Peter Mokaba Stadium	46,000	Polokwane	South Africa		Association football	
Estadio Cuscatlán	45,925	San Salvador	El Salvador	Alianza FC	Association football	
Stade Mohammed V	45,891	Casablanca	Morocco	Raja, Wydad	Association football	
Reser Stadium	45,674	Corvallis	US	Oregon State Beavers football	American football	
Estadio Olímpico Pascual Guerrero	45,625	Santiago de Cali	Colombia	América de Cali	Association football	
Tokyo Dome	45,600	Tokyo	Japan	Yomiuri Giants	Baseball	
Estadio Nacional	45,574	Lima	Peru	Selección de fútbol de Perú	Association football	
Páirc Uí Chaoimh	45,500	Cork City	Ireland	Cork GAA	Hurling, Gaelic football	
Estádio Ilha do Retiro	45,500	Recife	Brazil	Sport Club do Recife	Association football	
Estadio Ramón Sánchez Pizjuán	45,500	Seville	Spain	Sevilla FC	Association football	
Estadio Akron	45,500	Zapopan	Mexico	C.D. Guadalajara	Association football	
FBC Mortgage Stadium	45,301	Orlando	US	UCF Knights football	American football	
DY Patil Stadium	45,300	Navi Mumbai	India	Mumbai Indians*	Cricket	
Angel Stadium of Anaheim	45,050	Anaheim	US	Los Angeles Angels of Anaheim	Baseball	
Ahmad bin Ali Stadium	45,032	Al Rayyan	Qatar	Al-Rayyan SC	Association football	
Mangueirão	45,007	Belém	Brazil	Paysandú Sport Club*, Clube do Remo*	Association football	
Sanya Sports Centre Egret Stadium	45,000	Sanya	China		Association football	
Estádio da Machava	45,000	Maputo	Mozambique	Mozambique national football team	Association football	
Autódromo do Estoril	45,000	Estoril	Portugal	Portuguese motorcycle Grand Prix, Portuguese Grand Prix	Motor racing	
Autódromo Juan y Oscar Gálvez	45,000	Buenos Aires	Argentina	MotoGP	Motor racing	
Estádio Olímpico João Havelange	45,000	Rio de Janeiro	Brazil	Botafogo	Association football	
Fez Stadium	45,000	Fes	Morocco	Maghreb Fez	Association football	
Free State Stadium	45,000	Bloemfontein	South Africa	Free State Cheetahs, Cheetahs, Bloemfontein Celtic	Rugby union, Association football	
Hakuba Ski Jumping Stadium	45,000	Hakuba	Japan	1998 Winter Olympics	Ski jumping	
National Hockey Stadium Lahore	45,000	Lahore	Pakistan	Pakistan national field hockey team	Field hockey	
Stade Chahid Hamlaoui	45,000	Constantine	Algeria	CS Constantine	Association football	
Stade d'Agadir	45,000	Agadir	Morocco	Hassania Agadir	Association football	
Toyota Stadium	45,000	Toyota City	Japan	Nagoya Grampus*	Association football	
Citi Field	45,000	New York City	US	New York Mets	Baseball	
Panathinaiko Stadium	45,000	Athens	Greece	1896 Summer Olympics	Athletics	
Marrakesh Stadium	45,000	Marrakesh	Morocco	Kawkab Marrakech	Association football	
Weifang Sports Center Stadium	45,000	Weifang	China	local football teams	Association football	
Zayed Sports City Stadium	45,000	Abu Dhabi	United Arab Emirates	UAE President Cup finals	Association football	
Zibo Sports Center Stadium	45,000	Zibo	China	2010 AFC U-19 Championship	Association football	
Vidarbha Cricket Association Ground	44,904	Nagpur	India	Vidarbha cricket team	Cricket	
Education City Stadium	44,667	Al-Rayyan	Qatar		Association football	
Alumni Stadium	44,500	Chestnut Hill	US	Boston College Eagles football	American football	
Ulsan Munsu Football Stadium	44,466	Ulsan	South Korea	Ulsan HD FC, 2002 FIFA World Cup	Association football	
Al-Thumama Stadium	44,400	Doha	Qatar		Association football	
Al-Janoub Stadium	44,325	Al Wakrah	Qatar		Association football	
Max-Morlock-Stadion	44,308	Nuremberg	Germany	1. FC Nürnberg	Association football	
Albertão	44,200	Teresina	Brazil	Esporte Clube Flamengo*	Association football	
Gwangju World Cup Stadium	44,118	Gwangju	South Korea	Gwangju FC, 2002 FIFA World Cup	Association football	
Amon G. Carter Stadium	44,008	Fort Worth	US	TCU Horned Frogs football, Armed Forces Bowl	American football	
Calder Park Raceway	44,000	Melbourne	Australia	ATCC, NASCAR, AUSCAR, ANDRA, Australian Grand Prix	Motor racing	
Del Mar Racetrack	44,000	Del Mar	US	Pacific Classic Stakes, Eddie Read Handicap, Del Mar Oaks, John C. Mabee Handicap	Horse racing	
Mount Okura Ski Jump Stadium	44,000	Sapporo	Japan	1972 Winter Olympics, FIS Nordic World Ski Championships	Ski jumping	
Stadion Gdańsk	44,000	Gdańsk	Poland	UEFA Euro 2012, Lechia Gdańsk	Association football	
Suwon World Cup Stadium	43,959	Suwon	South Korea	Suwon Samsung Bluewings, 2002 FIFA World Cup	Association football	
Stadion Poznań	43,890	Poznań	Poland	KKS Lech Poznań	Association football	
Vasil Levski National Stadium	43,632	Sofia	Bulgaria	Bulgaria national football team	Association Football	
Citizens Bank Park	43,500	Philadelphia	US	Philadelphia Phillies	Baseball	
Mbombela Stadium	43,500	Mbombela	South Africa	2010 FIFA World Cup	Association football	
Estadio Pedro Bidegain	43,494	Buenos Aires	Argentina	Club Atlético San Lorenzo de Almagro	Association football	
Jeonju World Cup Stadium	43,348	Jeonju	South Korea	Jeonbuk Hyundai Motors, 2002 FIFA World Cup	Association football	
Progressive Field	43,345	Cleveland	US	Cleveland Guardians	Baseball	
Resonac Dome Oita	43,254	Ōita	Japan	Oita Trinita	Association football	
Estadio Universidad San Marcos	43,000	Lima	Peru	Universidad San Marcos	Association football	
Fitzgerald Stadium	43,000	Killarney	Ireland	Kerry GAA	Gaelic football, Hurling	
Ullevi	43,000	Gothenburg	Sweden	IFK Göteborg, GAIS, Örgryte IS*, BK Häcken*	Association football, Athletics	
Niedersachsenstadion	43,000	Hanover	Germany	Hannover 96	Association football	
Shaanxi Province Stadium	43,000	Xi'an	China		Association football	
Sapporo Dome	42,831	Sapporo	Japan	Consadole Sapporo, Hokkaido Nippon-Ham Fighters	Association football, Baseball	
Villa Park	42,788	Birmingham	United Kingdom	Aston Villa F.C.	Association football	
Maharashtra Cricket Association Stadium	42,700	Pune	India		Cricket	
Estadio Cuauhtémoc	42,648	Puebla	Mexico	Puebla F.C.	Association football	
Estadio Metropolitano de Mérida	42,500	Mérida	Venezuela	Estudiantes de Mérida FC	Association football	
St. Jakob-Park	42,500	Basel	Switzerland	FC Basel	Association football	
Sydney Football Stadium	42,500	Sydney	Australia	Sydney Roosters, New South Wales Waratahs, Sydney FC	Rugby league, Rugby union, Association football	
Petco Park	42,445	San Diego	US	San Diego Padres	Baseball	
Niigata Stadium	42,300	Niigata	Japan	Albirex Niigata	Association football	
American Family Field	42,200	Milwaukee	US	Milwaukee Brewers	Baseball	
Weserstadion	42,100	Bremen	Germany	Werder Bremen	Association football	
Great American Ball Park	42,059	Cincinnati	US	Cincinnati Reds	Baseball	
Estadio Garcilaso	42,056	Cusco	Peru	Cienciano	Association football	
Estádio do Zimpeto	42,055	Maputo	Mozambique	2011 All-Africa Games	Association football, Athletics	
Chengdu Sports Center	42,000	Chengdu	China		Association football	
Estadio Hernando Siles	42,000	La Paz	Bolivia	La Paz F.C., Club Bolívar*, The Strongest*	Association football	
Royal Bafokeng Stadium	42,000	Phokeng	South Africa		Rugby union, Association football, Athletics	
Woodbine Racetrack	42,000	Toronto	Canada	Canadian International Stakes, Queen's Plate, Woodbine Mile, E.P. Taylor Stakes	Horse racing	
Estadio Juan Domingo Perón	41,900	Buenos Aires	Argentina	Racing Club de Avellaneda	Association football	
Nationals Park	41,888	Washington	US	Washington Nationals	Baseball	
Stamford Bridge	41,798	London	United Kingdom	Chelsea F.C.	Association football	
Estadio Gigante de Arroyito	41,654	Rosario	Argentina	Rosario Central	Association football	
Estadio Rodrigo Paz Delgado	41,575	Quito	Ecuador	Liga Deportiva Universitaria	Association football	
Juventus Stadium	41,507	Turin	Italy	Juventus FC, Italy national football team	Association football	
Oracle Park	41,503	San Francisco	US	San Francisco Giants, Fight Hunger Bowl	Baseball, American football	
Estadio Morelos	41,500	Morelia	Mexico	Monarcas Morelia	Association football	
FirstBank Stadium	41,448	Nashville	US	Vanderbilt Commodores football	American football	
Goyang Stadium	41,311	Goyang	South Korea		Association football	
Polideportivo Cachamay	41,300	Ciudad Guayana	Venezuela	Atlético Club Mineros de Guayana	Association football	
Daejeon World Cup Stadium	41,295	Daejeon	South Korea	Daejeon Citizen, 2002 FIFA World Cup	Association football	
Stade Félix-Bollaert	41,233	Lens	France	RC Lens	Association football	
Truist Park	41,149	Atlanta	US	Atlanta Braves	Baseball	
Wrigley Field	41,118	Chicago	US	Chicago Cubs	Baseball	
Comerica Park	41,070	Detroit	US	Detroit Tigers	Baseball	
Bulldog Stadium	41,031	Fresno	US	Fresno State Bulldogs football	American football	
Watkins Glen International	41,000	Watkins Glen	US	6 Hours of Watkins Glen, Cheez-It 355 at The Glen	Motor racing	
Jawaharlal Nehru Stadium	41,000	Kochi	India	Kerala Blasters	Cricket, Association football	
Minute Maid Park	40,950	Houston	US	Houston Astros	Baseball	
Kauffman Stadium	40,793	Kansas City	US	Kansas City Royals	Baseball	
Ladd–Peebles Stadium	40,646	Mobile	US	South Alabama Jaguars football, Senior Bowl, GMAC Bowl	American football	
Guaranteed Rate Field	40,615	Chicago	US	Chicago White Sox	Baseball	
RCDE Stadium	40,500	Barcelona	Spain	RCD Espanyol	Association football	
Vantelin Dome Nagoya	40,500	Nagoya	Japan	Chunichi Dragons	Baseball	
Estadio Ciudad de Lanús – Néstor Díaz Pérez	40,320	Lanús	Argentina	Club Atlético Lanús	Association football	
Estadio Metropolitano de Fútbol de Lara	40,312	Barquisimeto	Venezuela	Unión Lara	Association football	
Globe Life Field	40,300	Arlington	US	Texas Rangers	Baseball	
Goodison Park	40,158	Liverpool	United Kingdom	Everton F.C.	Association football	
Stade Omnisports	40,122	Yaoundé	Cameroon	Tonnerre Yaoundé, Cameroon national football team	Association football	
Stade Leopold Senghor	40,000	Dakar	Senegal	Senegal national football team, ASC Jeanne d'Arc	Association football	
Aqueduct Racetrack	40,000	New York City	US	Carter Handicap, Cigar Mile Handicap, Wood Memorial Stakes	Horse racing	
Auteuil Hippodrome	40,000	Paris	France	Grand Steeple-Chase de Paris, Grande Course de Haies, Prix La Haye Jousselin	Horse racing	
In-N-Out Burger Pomona Dragstrip	40,000	Pomona	US	NHRA Drag Racing Series	Motor racing	
Brands Hatch	40,000	West Kingsdown	United Kingdom	F3, British Superbike, Formula One, BTCC	Motor racing	
Anoeta Stadium	40,000	San Sebastián	Spain	Real Sociedad	Association football	
Chennai Jawaharlal Nehru Stadium	40,000	Chennai	India	Chennaiyin FC	Association football	
Circuito del Jarama	40,000	Madrid	Spain	Formula One, Spanish Grand Prix, Spanish motorcycle Grand Prix, SBK	Motor racing	
Estadio Olímpico Metropolitano	40,000	San Pedro Sula	Honduras	C.D. Marathón, Honduras national football team	Association football	
Hang Jebat Stadium	40,000	Malacca	Malaysia		Association football	
Hauptstadion	40,000	Aachen	Germany	CHIO Aachen	Show jumping	
Heini Klopfer Ski Jump	40,000	Oberstdorf	Germany	FIS Ski Flying World Cup, FIS Ski-Flying World Championships	Ski flying	
Helsinki Olympic Stadium	40,000	Helsinki	Finland	Finland national football team	Association football, Athletics	
Hipódromo de Monterrico	40,000	Lima	Peru	Derby Nacional	Horse racing	
Hong Kong Stadium	40,000	So Kon Po	Hong Kong	Hong Kong Sevens, Hong Kong national football team, South China AA	Association football, Rugby	
JRD Tata Sports Complex	40,000	Jamshedpur	India	Jamshedpur FC	Association football	
Kanchenjunga Stadium	40,000	Siliguri	India	local football teams	Association football	
Kardinia Park	40,000	Geelong	Australia	Geelong Cats, Melbourne Renegades	Australian rules football, Cricket	
Kulm	40,000	Bad Mitterndorf	Austria	FIS Ski Flying World Cup, FIS Ski-Flying World Championships	Ski flying	
Mandela National Stadium	40,000	Kampala	Uganda	Express FC	Association football	
March 28 Stadium	40,000	Benghazi	Libya	Al-Ahly Benghazi, Al-Nasr Benghazi, Al Tahaddy Benghazi, Libya national football team*	Association football	
Michie Stadium	40,000	West Point	US	Army Black Knights football	American football	
Mỹ Đình National Stadium	40,000	Hanoi	Vietnam	Vietnam national football team	Association football	
Negeri Pulau Pinang Stadium	40,000	Batu Kawan	Malaysia	Penang FA*	Association football	
Nippert Stadium	40,000	Cincinnati	US	Cincinnati Bearcats football, FC Cincinnati	American football, Association football	
Orlando Stadium	40,000	Johannesburg	South Africa	Orlando Pirates, Kaizer Chiefs, Moroka Swallows	Association football	
Stadio San Filippo	40,000	Messina	Italy	ACR Messina	Association football	
Yantai Sports Park Stadium	40,000	Yantai	China	local football teams	Association football	
Castelão	40,000	São Luís	Brazil	Moto Club, Sampaio Corrêa	Association football	
Accra Sports Stadium	40,000	Accra	Ghana	Accra Hearts of Oak Sporting Club, Great Olympics	Association football	
Olympic Sports Centre	40,000	Beijing	China	local football teams	Association football	
Oulton Park	40,000	Little Budworth	United Kingdom	British Touring Car Championship, British Superbike	Motor racing	
Pikes Peak International Raceway	40,000	Fountain	US	NASCAR Testing	Motor racing	
Plaza México	40,000	Mexico City	Mexico		Bullfighting	
Rentschler Field	40,000	East Hartford	US	UConn Huskies football	American football	
Sarawak Stadium	40,000	Kuching	Malaysia	Sarawak FA	Association football	
Seoul Race Park	40,000	Gwacheon	South Korea	Korean Derby	Horse racing	
Stade d'Angondjé	40,000	Libreville	Gabon	Gabon national football team	Association football	
Tuodong Stadium	40,000	Kunming	China	China national football team*, local football teams	Association football	
Bogyoke Aung San Stadium	40,000	Yangon	Burma	local football teams	Association football	
Estadio Campeón del Siglo	40,000	Montevideo	Uruguay	Peñarol	Association football	
Taipei Dome	40,000	Taipei	Taiwan		Baseball	
Taizhou Sports Centre Stadium	40,000	Taizhou	China	local football teams	Association football	
Wuhu Olympic Stadium	40,000	Wuhu	China	local football teams	Association football	

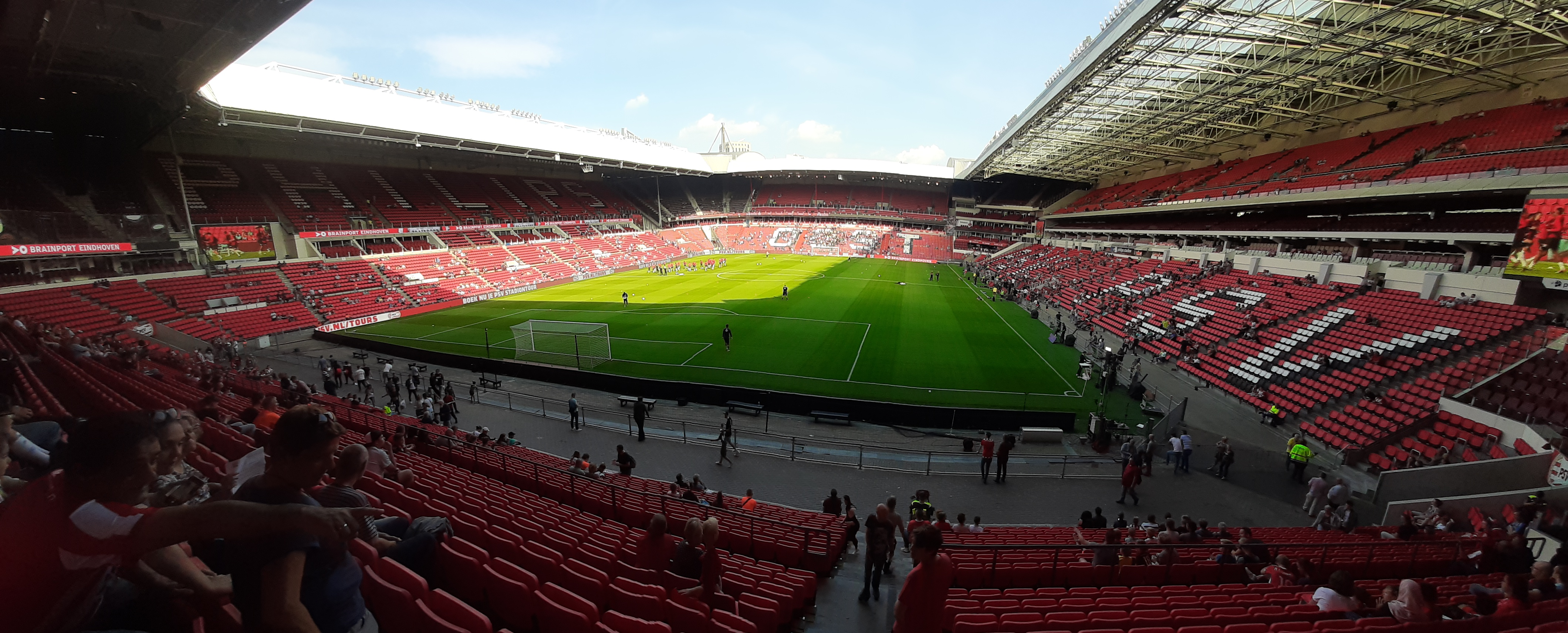
The Philips Stadion, the home of PSV, a Dutch football club from Eindhoven

== See also ==
- List of attendance figures at domestic professional sports leagues
- List of horse racing venues by capacity
- List of motor racing venues by capacity
- Lists of sports venues
- Lists of stadiums
