= List of motor racing venues by capacity =

The following is a list of motor racing venues, ordered by capacity; i.e. the maximum number of spectators they can accommodate. Due to the length of motor racing courses, and the fact that the cars pass each point frequently, it is often not possible to see the entire track from any one seat. This makes it possible to seat larger numbers of people, and differentiates a race-track from other stadiums, in which the entire field of play usually is visible from every seat. Some race-tracks also contain sitting or standing areas in the form of grassy banks. Currently all venues with a standard capacity of 35,000 or more are included.

== Motor racing venues by capacity ==
Italics indicate that the circuit formerly hosted a certain championship round.

#	Venue	Capacity	City	Country	Series	Image
1	Indianapolis Motor Speedway	257,325	Speedway	United States	IndyCar, NASCAR Cup Series, FIM MotoGP, FIA Formula One	
2	Adelaide Street Circuit	210,000	Adelaide	Australia	FIA Formula One, Supercars	
3	Shanghai International Circuit	200,000	Shanghai	China	FIA Formula One, Formula E, FIM MotoGP	
4	Silverstone Circuit	175,000	Silverstone	United Kingdom	FIA Formula One, FIM MotoGP	
5	Bristol Motor Speedway	162,000	Bristol	United States	NASCAR Cup Series	
6	Suzuka Circuit	155,000	Suzuka	Japan	FIA Formula One, SuperGT, Suzuka 8 Hours	
7	Istanbul Park	155,000	Istanbul	Turkey	FIA Formula One, FIM MotoGP	
8	Aintree Motor Racing Circuit	150,000	Aintree	United Kingdom	FIA Formula One	
9	Nürburgring	150,000	Nürburg	Germany	FIA Formula One, DTM	
10	Las Vegas Motor Speedway	142,000	Las Vegas	United States	NASCAR Cup Series, IndyCar	
11	Melbourne Grand Prix Circuit	141,000	Melbourne	Australia	FIA Formula One, Supercars	
12	Circuit de Barcelona-Catalunya	140,700	Barcelona	Spain	FIA Formula One, FIM MotoGP, World SBK	
13	Daytona International Speedway	140,000	Daytona Beach	United States	NASCAR Cup Series, Rolex 24, Daytona 200	
14	Fuji Speedway	140,000	Oyama	Japan	SuperGT, FIA Formula One	
15	Korea International Circuit	135,000	Yeongam	Korea	FIA Formula One	
16	Sepang International Circuit	130,000	Sepang	Malaysia	FIA Formula One, FIM MotoGP	
17	Circuit of the Americas	120,000	Austin	United States	FIA Formula One, NASCAR Cup Series, FIM MotoGP, IndyCar	
18	Buddh International Circuit	120,000	Greater Noida	India	FIM MotoGP, FIA Formula One	
19	EuroSpeedway Lausitz	120,000	Klettwitz	Germany	DTM, World SBK	
20	Hungaroring	120,000	Mogyoród	Hungary	FIA Formula One, FIA WTCC, DTM	
21	Circuit de Nevers Magny-Cours	120,000	Magny-Cours	France	FIA Formula One	
22	Autódromo José Carlos Pace	119,000	São Paulo	Brazil	FIA Formula One	
23	Autodromo Nazionale di Monza	115,000	Monza	Italy	FIA Formula One, DTM	
24	Texas Motor Speedway	112,662	Fort Worth	United States	NASCAR Cup Series, IndyCar	
25	Mandalika International Street Circuit	110,000	Lombok	Indonesia	FIM MotoGP	
26	Autódromo Hermanos Rodríguez	110,000	Mexico City	Mexico	FIA Formula One, Gran Premio de México	
27	Surfers Paradise Street Circuit	108,110	Surfers Paradise	Australia	CART, Supercars	
28	Kentucky Speedway	107,000	Sparta	United States	NASCAR Cup Series, IndyCar	
29	Circuit Park Zandvoort	105,000	Zandvoort	Netherlands	FIA Formula One, DTM	
30	TT Circuit Assen	105,000	Assen	Netherlands	FIM MotoGP, DTM, World SBK	
31	Autódromo Internacional do Algarve	100,000	Portimão	Portugal	FIA Formula One, FIM MotoGP, World SBK	
32	Goodwood Circuit	100,000	Chichester	United Kingdom	Goodwood Revival	
33	Circuit de la Sarthe	100,000	Le Mans	France	24 Hours of Le Mans, FIM MotoGP	
34	Circuit Gilles Villeneuve	100,000	Montreal	Canada	FIA Formula One, NASCAR Xfinity Series	
35	Atlanta Motor Speedway	99,000	Hampton	United States	NASCAR Cup Series	
36	Richmond International Raceway	94,000	Richmond	United States	NASCAR Cup Series	
37	Charlotte Motor Speedway	94,000	Concord	United States	NASCAR Cup Series	
38	New Hampshire Motor Speedway	93,000	Loudon	United States	NASCAR Cup Series	
39	Auto Club Raceway at Pomona	91,000	Pomona	United States	NHRA Series	
40	Circuit de Spa-Francorchamps	90,000	Spa	Belgium	FIA Formula One, 6 Hours of Spa-Francorchamps	
41	Donington Park	90,000	Castle Donington	United Kingdom	FIM MotoGP, FIA Formula One, BTCC	
42	Portland International Raceway	86,000	Portland, Oregon	United States	IndyCar	
43	Michigan International Speedway	85,000	Brooklyn	United States	NASCAR Cup Series	
44	Talladega Superspeedway	78,000	Talladega	United States	NASCAR Cup Series	
45	Pocono Raceway	77,000	Long Pond	United States	NASCAR Cup Series, IndyCar	
46	Mid-Ohio Sports Car Course	75,000	Lexington	United States	NASCAR Xfinity Series, IndyCar	
47	Kansas Speedway	74,000	Kansas City	United States	NASCAR Cup Series	
48	Chicagoland Speedway	70,000	Joliet	United States	NASCAR Cup Series, IndyCar	
49	Hockenheimring	70,000	Hockenheim	Germany	FIA Formula One, DTM	
50	Twin Ring Motegi	68,156 (Note: The Motegi complex has actual seating capacity for up to 100,000 for road races and 80,000 for oval races. However, the track operators have chosen to restrict ticket sales because the area's transport infrastructure cannot handle a full-capacity crowd.)	Motegi	Japan	FIM MotoGP, IndyCar	
51	Martinsville Speedway	65,000	Ridgeway	United States	NASCAR Cup Series	
52	Gateway International Raceway	65,000	Madison	United States	NASCAR Craftsman Truck Series, NASCAR Cup Series, IndyCar	
53	Autodromo Enzo e Dino Ferrari	60,000	Imola	Italy	FIA Formula One	
54	Darlington Raceway	60,000	Darlington	United States	NASCAR Cup Series	
55	Circuito de Jerez	60,000	Jerez de la Frontera	Spain	FIA Formula One, FIM MotoGP	
56	Circuit de la Comunitat Valenciana Ricardo Tormo	165,000	Cheste	Spain	FIM MotoGP	
57	Phakisa Freeway	60,000	Welkom	South Africa	FIM MotoGP	
58	Mount Panorama Circuit	57,939	Bathurst	Australia	Supercars	
59	Homestead-Miami Speedway	55,000	Homestead	United States	NASCAR Cup Series, IndyCar, FIA Formula E	
60	Dover International Speedway	54,000	Dover	United States	NASCAR Cup Series	
61	Phillip Island Grand Prix Circuit	53,100	Phillip Island	Australia	FIM MotoGP	
62	Losail International Circuit	52,000	Lusail	Qatar	Formula One, Grand Prix motorcycle racing, Asia Talent Cup	
63	Bahrain International Circuit	50,000	Sakhir	Bahrain	FIA Formula One, 8 Hours of Bahrain	
64	Croft Circuit	50,000	Dalton-on-Tees	United Kingdom	BTCC	
65	Milwaukee Mile	50,000	West Allis	United States	Indy Car	
66	Mugello Circuit	50,000	Mugello	Italy	FIA Formula One, FIM MotoGP, DTM, Would SBK	
67	Sentul International Circuit	50,000	Bogor	Indonesia	FIM MotoGP	
68	Sanair Super Speedway	50,000	Saint-Pie	Canada	IndyCar	
69	Yas Marina Circuit	50,000	Yas Island	United Arab Emirates	FIA Formula One	
70	Phoenix Raceway	50,000	Avondale	United States	NASCAR Cup Series, IndyCar	
71	Chang International Circuit	50,000	Buriram	Thailand	FIM MotoGP, World SBK	
72	Sonoma Raceway	47,000	Sonoma	United States	NASCAR Cup Series, IndyCar	
73	Autódromo do Estoril	45,000	Estoril	Portugal	FIM MotoGP, FIA Formula One, World SBK	
74	Autódromo Juan y Oscar Gálvez	45,000	Buenos Aires	Argentina	FIA Formula One, FIM MotoGP	
75	Calder Park Raceway	44,000	Melbourne	Australia	ATCC, Australian NASCAR Championship, AUSCAR, Australian National Drag Championships, Australian Grand Prix, FIA WTCC	
76	Cadwell Park	40,000	Tathwell	United Kingdom	British Superbike	
77	Brands Hatch	40,000	West Kingsdown	United Kingdom	British Superbike, FIA Formula One	
78	Circuito del Jarama	40,000	Madrid	Spain	FIA Formula E, FIA Formula One, FIM MotoGP, World SBK	
79	Oulton Park	40,000	Little Budworth	United Kingdom	BTCC, British Superbike	
80	Pikes Peak International Raceway	40,000	Fountain	United States	IndyCar	
81	Watkins Glen International	35,000	Watkins Glen	United States	NASCAR Cup Series, IndyCar, FIA Formula One	

== Defunct venues ==
Venue	Capacity	City	Country	Closed	Series
Brooklands	287,000	Weybridge	United Kingdom	1939	Grandes Épreuves
Ontario Motor Speedway	140,000	Ontario	United States	1980	California 500
Auto Club Speedway	122,000	Fontana	United States	2023	NASCAR Cup Series, Indycar
Crystal Palace	71,311	London	United Kingdom	1972	Motor racing
Maroubra Speedway	70,000	Maroubra	Australia	1947	Motor racing
Autódromo Internacional Nelson Piquet	60,000	Rio de Janeiro	Brazil	2008	CART, MotoGP, FIA Formula One
Rockingham Motor Speedway	52,000	Corby	United Kingdom	2018	BTCC
Harringay Stadium	50,000	London	United Kingdom	1987	Motor racing
Nazareth Speedway	45,000	Nazareth	United States	2004	IRL, NASCAR Busch Series
Hyde Road	40,000	Manchester	United Kingdom	1987	Speedway

== See also ==
- List of motor racing tracks
- List of stadiums by capacity
- List of horse racing venues by capacity
- List of sports venues by capacity
- Lists of sports venues
- Lists of stadiums
