= List of horse racing venues by capacity =

The following is a list of horse racing venues, ordered by capacity. The figures generally represent the licensed capacity of the venue, which is usually far higher than the number of seats in the stands. Venues with a capacity of 40,000 or more are included.

== Horse racing venues by capacity ==
| # | Venue | Capacity | Location | Country | Image |
|---|---|---|---|---|---|
| 1 | Tokyo Racecourse | 223,000 | Tokyo | Japan | |
| 2 | Nakayama Racecourse | 165,676 | Chiba | Japan | |
| 3 | Churchill Downs | 165,000 | Louisville, Kentucky | United States | |
| 4 | Hanshin Racecourse | 139,877 | Hyogo | Japan | |
| 5 | Flemington Racecourse | 130,000 | Melbourne | Australia | |
| 6 | Kyoto Racecourse | 120,000 | Kyoto | Japan | |
| 7 | Hipódromo de San Isidro | 100,000 | San Isidro | Argentina | |
| 8 | Pimlico Race Course | 98,983 | Baltimore | United States | |
| 9 | Belmont Park | 90,000 | Elmont, New York | United States | |
| 10 | Sha Tin Racecourse | 85,000 | Sha Tin District | Hong Kong, China | |
| 11 | Santa Anita Park | 85,000 | Arcadia, California | United States | |
| 12 | Epsom Downs | 80,000 | Epsom | United Kingdom | |
| 13 | Hipódromo da Gávea | 80,000 | Rio de Janeiro | Brazil | |
| 14 | Aintree Racecourse | 75,000 | Liverpool | United Kingdom | |
| 15 | Niigata Racecourse | 75,000 | Niigata | Japan | |
| 16 | Ascot Racecourse | 70,000 | Ascot | United Kingdom | |
| 17 | Cheltenham Racecourse | 67,500 | Cheltenham | United Kingdom | |
| 18 | Hamilton Park Racecourse | 60,000 | Hamilton | United Kingdom | |
| 19 | Meydan Racecourse | 60,000 | Dubai Meydan City | United Arab Emirates | |
| 20 | Hippodrome de Vincennes | 60,000 | Paris | France | |
| 21 | Chukyo Racecourse | 58,400 | Toyoake, Aichi | Japan | |
| 22 | York Racecourse | 56,000 | York | United Kingdom | |
| 23 | Happy Valley Racecourse | 55,000 | Happy Valley, Hong Kong | Hong Kong, China | |
| 24 | Doncaster Racecourse | 50,000 | Doncaster | United Kingdom | |
| 25 | Club Hipico de Santiago | 50,000 | Santiago | Chile | |
| 26 | Fukushima Racecourse | 50,000 | Fukushima | Japan | |
| 27 | Hipodromo Argentino de Palermo | 50,000 | Palermo | Argentina | |
| 28 | Horner Rennbahn | 50,000 | Hamburg | Germany | |
| 29 | Longchamp Racecourse | 50,000 | Paris | France | |
| 30 | Sapporo Racecourse | 50,000 | Sapporo | Japan | |
| 31 | Saratoga Race Course | 50,000 | Saratoga Springs | United States | |
| 32 | Caulfield Racecourse | 46,800 | Melbourne | Australia | |
| 33 | Del Mar Racetrack | 44,000 | Del Mar | United States | |
| 34 | Woodbine Racetrack | 42,000 | Toronto | Canada | |
| 35 | Auteuil Hippodrome | 40,000 | Paris | France | |
| 36 | Hipódromo de Monterrico | 40,000 | Lima | Peru | |
| 37 | Seoul Race Park | 40,000 | Gwacheon | South Korea | |
| 38 | Galopprennbahn Hoppegarten | 40,000 | Berlin | Germany | |
| 39 | Hippodrome Waregem | 40,000 | Waregem | Belgium | |

== Defunct venues ==
| Venue | Capacity | Location | Country | Closed |
|---|---|---|---|---|
| Circus Maximus | 270,000 (est.) | Rome | Roman Empire | 103 |
| Hippodrome of Constantinople | 100,000 | Constantinople | Byzantine Empire | 1453 |
| Sportsman's Park | 67,000 | Cicero | United States | 2003 |
| Ely Racecourse | 40,000 | Cardiff | United Kingdom | 1939 |

== See also ==
- List of horse racing venues
- List of stadiums by capacity
- List of sports venues by capacity
- Lists of sports venues
- Lists of stadiums
