= Bainbridge, Ohio =

Bainbridge is the name of some places in the U.S. state of Ohio:

- Bainbridge Township, Geauga County, Ohio
  - Bainbridge (CDP), Ohio, a census-designated place in Bainbridge Township
- Bainbridge, Ross County, Ohio
