= Lists of sports venues =

Lists of sports venues includes sport venue-related lists.

== By capacity ==
- List of sports venues by capacity
- List of sporting venues with a highest attendance of 100,000 or more
- List of horse racing venues by capacity
- List of indoor arenas by capacity
- List of motor racing venues by capacity
- List of stadiums by capacity
  - List of cricket grounds by capacity
  - List of rugby league stadiums by capacity
  - List of rugby union stadiums by capacity

== Other ==
- List of indoor arenas
- List of motor racing tracks
- List of NASCAR race tracks
- List of stadiums
- List of future stadiums
- List of rowing venues
- List of tennis venues
- List of velodromes
