= Supercuts Superbike Challenge =

Annual motorcycle race in California, USA

The Supercuts Superbike Challenge is a motorcycle race held at Sonoma Raceway every May. It is a popular race among Californians.
