= Dubai Meydan City =

Human settlement

Coordinates: 25.1786508°N 55.3249168°E

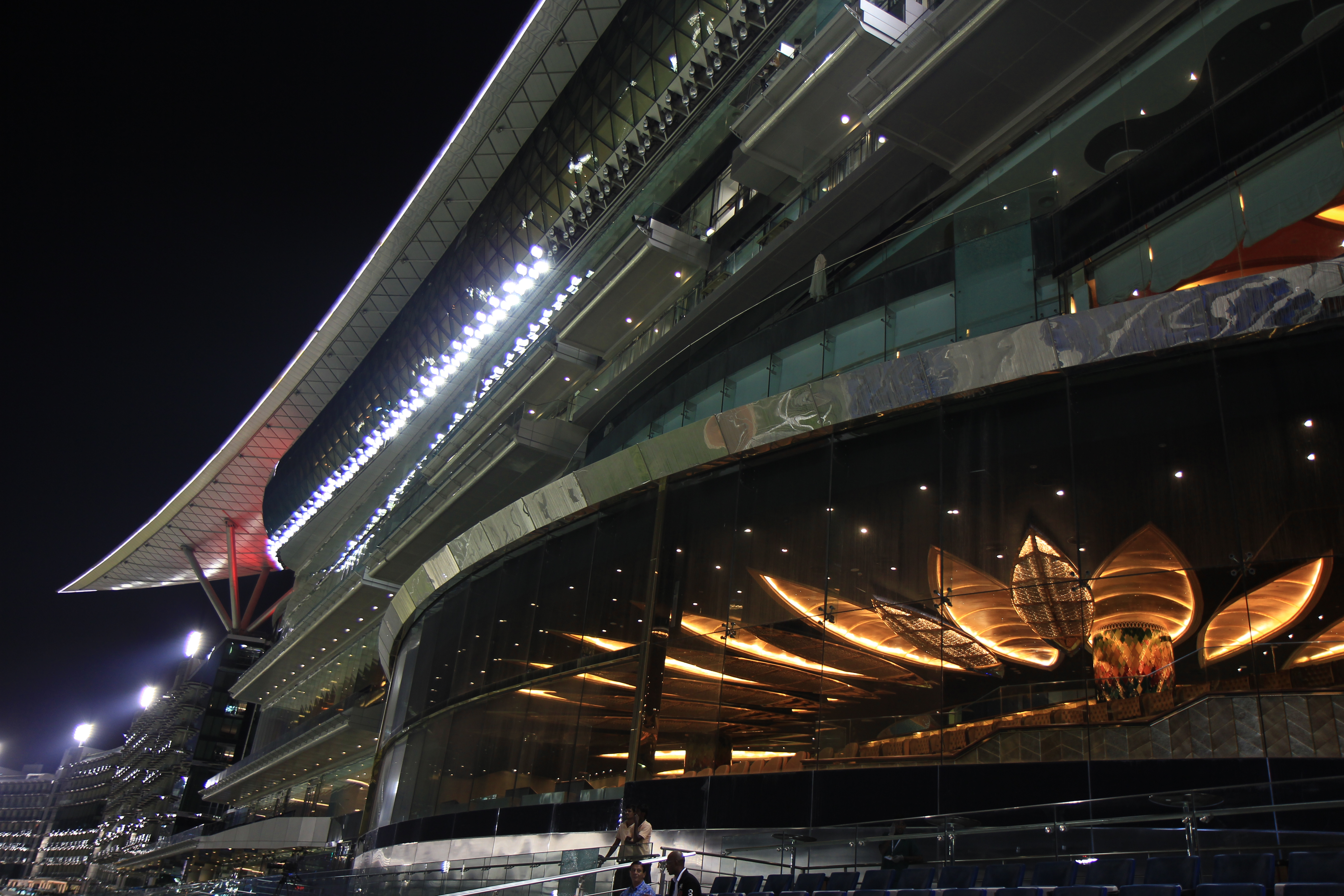
Meydan Racecourse, Nad Al Sheba, Dubai.

Dubai Meydan City is a new development under construction in the Ras Al Khor area of Dubai, UAE. The project was master planned by Teo A. Khing Design Consultants (TAK) who also master planned the Meydan Racecourse. It was launched on the eve of the 2007 Dubai World Cup. The entire development will cover more than 40,000,000 square feet (3,700,000 m^{2}) GFA (gross floor area) on a land size of around 15,000,000 square feet (1,400,000 m^{2}). It is expected to be completed in 2020, while Meydan Racecourse officially opened on 27 March 2010. The development includes hotels, sky-bubble restaurant, entertainment, clubs, a concourse plaza, IMAX movie theater, towers and a boat-house.

== Attractions ==
=== Meydan Racecourse ===
Meydan Racecourse is able to accommodate over 60,000 spectators in a 1 mile long grandstand. When not used for races it will serve as a business and conference integrated facility. A horse racing museum and gallery are also planned. The development also includes a 9-hole golf course. The 7.5 million sq. m Meydan Racecourse includes Meydan Marina, The Meydan the world's first 5-star trackside hotel with 285 rooms, 2 race tracks and the Grandstand, which comprises a hotel, restaurants, a racing museum and 72 corporate suites for entertaining throughout the year. Meydan Free Zone also operates from the premises of the hotel.

=== Meydan One ===
Meydan One was announced in August 2015. It is a luxury district with a large scope of work. Covering an area of 3.67 million sq ft (341 thousand m^{2}) it will feature a mall (the Meydan One Mall), a 711-meter-tall (2,333 ft) Dubai One Tower (billed now as the tallest residential tower in the world), a civic plaza and a 4 kilometer canal and marina with 100 berths. The project will be located in the area extending between Medyan Hotel and Al Khail Road and will be developed by Meydan City Corporation. Phase One of the project is expected to be completed by 2020 at the time that Dubai will host the Expo 2020.

=== Dubai One Tower ===
Announced in August 2015, the Dubai One Tower (part of Meydan One District) is expected to be the world's tallest residential tower when complete. The tower will feature 885 residential apartments and a five star hotel with 350 rooms. The building will also feature a conference center, a 655-meter-high (2,149 ft) observation deck, a 675-meter-high (2,215 ft) restaurant and will be close to the proposed Meydan One Marina Yacht Club.

=== Horizons ===
Horizons is a 3,700,000-square-metre (40,000,000 sq ft) residential development that consists of Meydan Gateway Towers, Meydan Tower, Horseshoe plaza, and Bathhouse Residences.

=== Metropolis ===
Metropolis is a 350,000-square-metre (3,800,000 sq ft) commercial development that consists of 17 office buildings built on a single pedestrian podium.

=== Millennium Estates ===
A gated residential haven of 198 luxury villas comes across as a visionary attempt to evoke and inspire the spirit of community living.

=== Godolphin Parks ===
Godolphin Parks includes the Godolphin Gateway Tower and a Mall.

== Transportation ==
There are plans to build a tramline which will run from Meydan City to Meydan Racecourse and can carry around 10,000 people every hour.

== See also ==
- List of development projects in Dubai
