= List of closed stadiums by capacity =

This list of closed stadiums by capacity shows demolished, unused, or otherwise closed sports stadiums ordered by their capacity, that is the maximum number of spectators that the stadium could accommodate seated by the end of its use. Stadiums that had a capacity of 15,000 or greater are included.

Most of the largest past stadiums were used for association football or American football. However, some high capacity venues were used for baseball, cricket, Gaelic games, rugby union, rugby league, Australian rules football and Canadian football. Many stadiums had a running track around the perimeter of the pitch allowing them to be used for athletics.

== List ==
Image	Past stadium	Capacity	City	Country	Tenant	Closed	Sport
	Strahov Stadium	250,000 (Note: 56,000 with individual seats.)	Prague	Czech Republic	Czechoslovak state, Sparta Prague training	1994	Spartakiad, Association football
	Central Stadium	120,000	Leipzig	East Germany	East Germany	1997	Sports
	West Ham Stadium	120,000	London	England	Thames A.F.C., Speedway Hammers	1972	Association football, Speedway, Greyhound racing
	John F. Kennedy Stadium	102,000	Philadelphia	United States	Philadelphia Eagles (1936–39, 1941), best known for Army–Navy Game (1936–1979)	1992	American football
	Tower Athletic Ground	100,000	New Brighton	England	New Brighton Tower, New Brighton	1977	Association football
	Kirov Stadium	100,000	Saint Petersburg	Russia	FC Zenit St. Petersburg	2006	Association football, Athletics
	White City Stadium	93,000	London	England	1908 Summer Olympics, 1934 British Empire Games, 1966 World Cup, Queens Park Rangers F.C.	1983	Association football, Athletics
	Centennial Olympic Stadium	85,000	Atlanta	United States	1996 Summer Olympics	1996 (Note: As originally planned, the stadium was reconfigured into the baseball-specific Turner Field, and served in that role from 1997 to 2016. After the Atlanta Braves moved to the venue now known as Truist Park for the 2017 season, Turner Field was purchased by Georgia State University, which reconfigured the facility a second time into the venue now known as Center Parc Stadium.)	Athletics
	Pontiac Silverdome	82,000	Pontiac	United States	Detroit Lions, Detroit Pistons	2013	American football, basketball
	Wembley Stadium (1923)	82,000	London	England	1948 Summer Olympics, 1966 World Cup, 1996 Euro	2000	Association football, Athletics
	Cleveland Stadium	81,000	Cleveland	United States	Cleveland Browns, Cleveland Indians	1996	American football, Baseball
	Tulane Stadium	80,985	New Orleans	United States	Tulane Green Wave, New Orleans Saints	1979	American football
	Shah Alam Stadium	80,372	Shah Alam	Malaysia	Selangor	2020	Association football, athletics
	Giants Stadium	80,200	East Rutherford	United States	New York Giants, New York Jets, New York Cosmos	2010	American football, association football
	Georgia Dome	80,000	Atlanta	United States	Atlanta Falcons, Atlanta Hawks, Georgia State Panthers	2017	American football, basketball
	Estádio da Luz	78,000	Lisbon	Portugal	S.L. Benfica	2003	Association football
	Waverley Park	78,000	Melbourne	Australia	Fitzroy Football Club, St Kilda Football Club, Hawthorn Football Club	2000 (Note: The stadium was closed in 2000 once Docklands Stadium opened, and was almost completely demolished in 2002. The main grandstand and oval, listed on the Victorian Heritage Register, still stand; capacity is now 2,000. Used for training and occasional lower-tier matches.)	Australian rules football
	Mile High Stadium	76,273	Denver	United States	Denver Bears, Denver Broncos, Colorado Rockies	2002	American football, baseball
	Miami Orange Bowl	74,476	Miami	United States	Miami Dolphins, Miami Hurricanes football	2008	American football
	Tampa Stadium	74,301	Tampa	United States	Tampa Bay Buccaneers, Tampa Bay Rowdies, Tampa Bay Bandits, South Florida Bulls football, Tampa Bay Mutiny	1999	American football, association football
	Gator Bowl Stadium	73,227	Jacksonville	United States	Gator Bowl	1994 (Note: The pedestrian ramp system and west upper deck of the stadium remain standing as part of EverBank Stadium; the remainder was demolished.)	American football
	Madison Square Garden Bowl	72,000	New York	United States	Boxing matches	1945	Boxing
	10th-Anniversary Stadium	71,008	Warsaw	Poland	Poland national football team	2008	Association football
	San Diego Stadium	70,561	San Diego	United States	San Diego Chargers, San Diego Padres, San Diego State Aztecs football	2019	American football, baseball
	Candlestick Park	69,732	San Francisco	United States	San Francisco Giants, Oakland Raiders, San Francisco 49ers, San Francisco Golden Gate Gales	2014	Baseball, American football, association football
	Stadio delle Alpi	69,000	Turin	Italy	Juventus FC	2008	Association football
	Kingdome	66,000	Seattle	United States	Seattle Seahawks, Seattle Mariners	2000	American football, baseball
	Texas Stadium	65,675	Irving	United States	Dallas Cowboys, Dallas Tornado, SMU Mustangs football	2008	American football, association football
	Veterans Stadium	65,386	Philadelphia	United States	Philadelphia Eagles, Philadelphia Phillies	2004	American football, baseball
	Workers' Stadium (1959)	65,094	Beijing	China	Beijing Guoan F.C.	2020	Association football
	Wulihe Stadium	65,000	Shenyang	China	Changsha Ginde F.C.	2007	Association football
	Meiji Shrine Outer Park Stadium	65,000	Tokyo	Japan	1930 Far Eastern Games	1956	Athletics
	Hubert H. Humphrey Metrodome	64,121	Minneapolis	United States	Minnesota Vikings (1982–2013), Minnesota Twins (1982–2009), Minnesota Golden Gophers football (1982–2008), Minnesota Golden Gophers baseball (select games, 1985–2013), Minnesota Timberwolves (1989–1990), Minnesota United FC (select games, 2012–2013)	2013	American football, baseball, basketball, association football
	Wankdorf Stadium	64,000	Bern	Switzerland	BSC Young Boys	2001	Association Football
	Deutsches Stadion	64,000	Berlin	Germany	Germany national football team	1934	Association football
	Astrodome	62,439	Houston	United States	Houston Oilers, Houston Astros	2004	American football, baseball
	Atlanta–Fulton County Stadium	60,606	Atlanta	United States	Atlanta Falcons, Atlanta Braves	1997	American football, baseball
	Foxboro Stadium	60,292	Foxborough	United States	New England Patriots	2002	American football
	Pitt Stadium	60,190	Pittsburgh	United States	Pittsburgh Panthers football	1999	American football
	Stadionul National	60,120	Bucharest	Romania	Romania national football team	2008	Association football
	Station Road	60,000	Pendlebury	England	Swinton RLFC	1992	Rugby league
	Stadion Edmunda Szyca	60,000	Poznań	Poland	Warta Poznań	1992	Association football
	Central Park	60,000	Wigan	England	Wigan RLFC	1999	Rugby league
	Camp de Les Corts	60,000	Barcelona	Spain	FC Barcelona	1957	Association football
	Olympic Stadium	60,000	Grenoble	France	1968 Winter Olympics	1968	Opening and closing ceremonies
	Riverfront Stadium	59,754	Cincinnati	United States	Cincinnati Bengals, Cincinnati Reds	2002	American football, baseball
	Kezar Stadium	59,636	San Francisco	United States	San Francisco 49ers	1970 (Note: The original Kezar Stadium was demolished in 1989. A new Kezar Stadium, with a capacity of 10,000, was opened on the same site in 1990.)	American football
	Three Rivers Stadium	59,000	Pittsburgh	United States	Pittsburgh Steelers, Pittsburgh Pirates	2001	American football, baseball
	RCA Dome	57,980	Indianapolis	United States	Indianapolis Colts	2008	American football
	Shea Stadium	57,333	New York	United States	New York Jets, New York Mets	2008	American football, baseball
	Yankee Stadium	56,936	New York	United States	New York Yankees	2008	American football, baseball
	Memorial Stadium	56,652	Minneapolis	United States	Minnesota Golden Gophers football	1982	American football
	Robert F. Kennedy Memorial Stadium	56,692	Washington, D.C.	United States	Washington Redskins, Washington Nationals, D.C. United	2019	American football, association football, baseball
	Victoria Ground	56,000	Stoke-on-Trent	England	Stoke City F.C.	1997	Association football
	Estadio Gasómetro	55,000	Buenos Aires	Argentina	Club Atlético San Lorenzo de Almagro	1993	Association football
	Polo Grounds	55,000	New York	United States	New York Giants	1964	American football, baseball
	National Stadium, Singapore	55,000	Singapore	Singapore	Singapore national football team	2007	Association football
	Vicente Calderon Stadium	54,907	Madrid	Spain	Atlético Madrid	2017	Association football
	Rheinstadion	54,000	Düsseldorf	Germany	Fortuna Düsseldorf	2005	Association football
	Memorial Stadium	53,371	Baltimore	United States	Baltimore Colts, Baltimore Orioles	2001	American football, baseball
	Milwaukee County Stadium	53,192	Milwaukee	United States	Milwaukee Brewers	2001 (Note: Much of the playing surface was reused for Helfaer Field, a youth baseball park, with the remainder of the stadium demolished.)	American football, Baseball
	Cardiff Arms Park	53,000	Cardiff	Wales	Wales national rugby union team	1997 (Note: The fate of this stadium is complex. The name "Cardiff Arms Park" is today applied to a rugby ground adjacent to the current Millennium Stadium. The South Stand of the current Arms Park is physically attached to the 1970 North Stand of the former National Stadium that stood on the site. The North Stand today forms what is colloquially called "Glanmor's Gap" in Millennium Stadium.)	Rugby union
	Tiger Stadium	52,416	Detroit	United States	Detroit Lions, Detroit Tigers	1999	American football, baseball
	Estádio José Alvalade	52,411	Lisbon	Portugal	Sporting Clube de Portugal	2003	Association football
	Idrætsparken	52,377	Copenhagen	Denmark	Denmark national football team	1990	Association football
	Football Park	51,240	Adelaide	Australia	Adelaide Football Club, Port Adelaide Football Club	2015	Australian rules football
	Aloha Stadium	50,000	Honolulu	United States	Hawaiʻi Warriors football	2020	American football, baseball
	Cathkin Park	50,000	Glasgow	Scotland	Queen's Park F.C.	1967	Association football
	Celtic Park	50,000	Belfast	Northern Ireland	Belfast Celtic F.C.	1980s	Association football, greyhound racing
	Stadio Nazionale PNF	50,000	Rome	Italy	S.S. Lazio, A.S. Roma	1953	Association football
	Stadion Eden	50,000	Prague	Czech Republic	Slavia Prague	2006	Association football
	Stadion der Weltjugend	50,000	Berlin	Germany		1992	Association football, Tennis, Athletics
	The Mount	50,000	Catford	England	Charlton Athletic, Catford South End F.C.	1950s	Association football
	Bank Street	50,000	Manchester	England	Manchester United F.C.	1910	Association football
	Korakuen Stadium	50,000	Tokyo	Japan	Yomiuri Giants	1988	Baseball
	Stagg Field	50,000	Chicago	United States	Chicago Maroons football	1957	American football
	Stadion Za Lužánkami	50,000	Brno	Czech Republic	1. FC Brno	2001	Association football
	Harringay Stadium	50,000	London	England		1987	Greyhound racing, speedway
	Prince Moulay Abdellah Stadium	50,000	Rabat	Morocco	AS FAR, Morocco national football team	2023	Association football
	Busch Memorial Stadium	49,676	St. Louis	United States	St. Louis Cardinals (baseball), St. Louis Cardinals (football)	2005	American football, Baseball
	Turner Field	49,586	Atlanta	United States	Atlanta Braves	2016 (Note: Reconfigured into the venue now known as Center Parc Stadium for American football.)	Baseball
	Lansdowne Road	49,000	Dublin	Ireland	Ireland rugby union team, Republic of Ireland national football team	2007	Rugby union, association football
	Ali Sami Yen Stadium	48,600	Istanbul	Turkey	Galatasaray	2011	Association football
	Metropolitan Stadium	48,446	Bloomington	United States	Minnesota Vikings, Minnesota Twins	1985	American football, baseball
	Estádio das Antas	48,297	Porto	Portugal	F.C. Porto	2004	Association football
	Cardinal Stadium	47,925	Louisville	United States	Louisville Cardinals football, Louisville Redbirds/RiverBats	2005 (Note: This venue, locally known as Old Cardinal Stadium to distinguish it from a newer Cardinal Stadium (now L&N Federal Credit Union Stadium) on the University of Louisville campus, only saw sporadic use after its closure in 2005. The stands were closed in 2013 and partially demolished in 2014, with full demolition following in 2019.)	American football, baseball
	Ryan Field (Note: Not to be confused with the new Ryan Field, currently under construction on the footprint of the now-demolished original and set to open in 2026.)	47,130	Evanston	United States	Northwestern Wildcats football	2023	American football
	War Memorial Stadium	46,500	Buffalo	United States	Buffalo Bills, Buffalo Bisons	1973	American football, baseball
	Lea Bridge Road	46,289	London	England	Leyton Orient F.C.	1937	Association Football, speedway
	Ferry Field	46,000	Ann Arbor	United States	Michigan Wolverines Football	1926	American Football
	Sydney Football Stadium (1988)	45,500	Sydney	Australia	New South Wales Waratahs, Sydney FC, Sydney Roosters	2018	Association football, rugby league, rugby union
	Parkstadion	45,067	Gelsenkirchen	Germany	FC Schalke 04	2001	Association football
	Fallowfield Stadium	45,000	Manchester	England		1994	Athletics, association football, track cycling
	Comiskey Park	43,951	Chicago	United States	Chicago White Sox, Chicago Cardinals	1990	American football, baseball
	Exhibition Stadium	43,737	Toronto	Canada	Toronto Blue Jays, Toronto Argonauts	1999	Canadian football, baseball
	Estadi de Sarrià	43,667	Barcelona	Spain	RCD Espanyol	1997	Association football
	Arlington Stadium	43,521	Arlington	United States	Texas Rangers	1994	Baseball
	Subiaco Oval	43,500	Perth	Australia	Fremantle FC, West Coast Eagles, Australia Wallabies*	2017	Australian rules football, rugby union
	Tournament Park	43,000	Pasadena	United States	Rose Bowl Game	1922	American football
	Kanjuruhan Stadium	42,449	Malang	Indonesia	Arema FC	2022	Association football
	Palmer Stadium	42,000	Princeton	United States	Princeton Tigers	1996	American football
	Athletic Grounds	41,831	Rochdale	England	Rochdale Hornets RLFC	1988	Rugby league
	Campo das Salésias	41,000	Lisbon	Portugal	C.F. Os Belenenses	1956	Association football
	Fartown Ground	40,000 (approx)	Huddersfield	England	Huddersfield RLFC	2004	Rugby league
	Hyde Road	40,000	Manchester	England	Manchester City F.C.	1923	Association football
	Springfield Park	40,000	Wigan	England	Wigan Athletic F.C.	1999	Association football
	Park Royal Ground	40,000	London	England	Queens Park Rangers F.C.	After 1907	Association football
	Grugastadion	40,000	Essen	Germany		2001	Association football
	Stadio Giorgio Ascarelli	40,000	Naples	Italy		1942	Association football
	Estadio Nacional de Peru	40,000	Lima	Peru	Peru national football team	1951	Association football
	Parque Pereira	40,000	Montevideo	Uruguay	Uruguay national football team	1920	Association football
	Estadio Alvear y Tagle	40,000	Buenos Aires	Argentina	Club Atlético River Plate	1938	Association football
	Braves Field	40,000	Boston	United States	Boston Braves	1955 (Note: The pavilion grandstand at the end of the right field foul line remains standing as the core of today's Nickerson Field..)	Baseball
	Stade Vélodrome de Rocourt	40,000	Liege	Belgium		1995	Association football
	Eastville Stadium	39,462	Bristol	England	Bristol Rovers F.C.	1998	Association football
	Athletic Park	39,000	Wellington	New Zealand	Hurricanes, Wellington Lions	1999	Rugby union
	Ferenc Puskas Stadium	38,652	Budapest	Hungary	Hungary national football team	2016	Association football
	Lancaster Park	38,628	Christchurch	New Zealand	Crusaders, Canterbury	2011	Rugby union, Cricket
	Arsenal Stadium	38,000	London	England	Arsenal F.C.	2006	Association football
	Mountaineer Field	38,000	Morgantown	United States	West Virginia Mountaineers	1987	American football
	Stoll Field/McLean Stadium	37,000	Lexington	United States	Kentucky Wildcats	1972	American football
	St. Jakob Stadium	36,800	Basel	Switzerland	FC Basel	1998	Association football
	Goldstone Ground	36,747	Hove	England	Brighton & Hove Albion F.C.	1997	Association football
	Råsunda Stadium	36,608	Solna	Sweden	Sweden men's national football team, AIK	2012	Association football
	Dynamo Stadium	36,540	Moscow	Russia	FC Dynamo Moscow	2008	Association football
	Estadio Tecnológico	36,485	Monterrey	Mexico	CF Monterrey	2017	Association football, American Football
	White Hart Lane	36,284	London	England	Tottenham Hotspur	2017	Association football
	Estadio Metropolitano de Madrid	35,800	Madrid	Spain	Atlético Madrid	1966	Association football
	Municipal Stadium	35,561	Kansas City	United States	Kansas City Chiefs, Kansas City Athletics	1976	American football, baseball
	Stadion am Gesundbrunnen	35,239	Berlin	Germany	Hertha Berlin	1974	Association football
	Maine Road Stadium	35,150	Manchester	England	Manchester City F.C.	2003	Association football
	Boleyn Ground	35,016	London	England	West Ham United	2016	Association football
	Yuri Gagarin Stadium	35,000	Varna	Bulgaria	PFC Spartak Varna	2007	Association football
	Forbes Field	35,000	Pittsburgh	United States	Pittsburgh Steelers, Pittsburgh Pirates	1971	American football, baseball
	Clyde Williams Stadium	35,000	Ames	United States	Iowa State Cyclones	1975	American football
	Hankyu Nishinomiya Stadium	35,000	Nishinomiya	Japan	Hankyu Braves	2002	Baseball
	Central Stadium	35,000	Tbilisi	Georgia	FC Dinamo Tbilisi	1976	Association football
	Incheon Civil Stadium	35,000	Incheon	South Korea	Incheon Korail	2008	Association football
	Kings Park Soccer Stadium	35,000	Durban	South Africa	Manning Rangers	2006	Association football
	Théâtre des Cérémonies	35,000	Albertville	France	1992 Winter Olympics	1992	Opening and closing ceremonies
	Tokyo Stadium	35,000	Tokyo	Japan	Lotte Orions	1977	Baseball
	Junak Stadium	35,000	Sofia	Bulgaria	Bulgaria national football team	1952	Association football
	Brookside Stadium	35,000	Cleveland	United States	Cleveland Baseball Federation	late 1980s	American football, baseball
	Bökelbergstadion	34,500	Mönchengladbach	Germany	Borussia Mönchengladbach	2004	Association football
	Temple Stadium	34,200	Philadelphia	United States	Temple Owls	1997	American football
	Shibe Park	33,608	Philadelphia	United States	Philadelphia Eagles, Philadelphia Phillies	1976	American football, baseball
	Autostade	33,172	Montreal	Canada	Montreal Alouettes	1976	Canadian football
	Manor Ground	33,000	London	England	Woolwich Arsenal F.C.	1913	Association football
	Colt Stadium	33,000	Houston	United States	Houston Astros	1970	Baseball
	Yale Field	33,000	New Haven	United States	Yale Bulldogs	1914	American football
	Dan Păltinişanu Stadium	32,972	Timișoara	Romania	ACS Poli Timișoara	2022	Association football
	Casement Park	32,600	Belfast	Northern Ireland	Antrim GAA	2013	Gaelic games
	Hughes Stadium	32,500	Fort Collins	United States	Colorado State Rams	2016	American football
	Stadion Zagłębia Lubin	32,430	Lubin	Poland	Zagłębie Lubin	2007	Association football
	Empire Stadium	32,375	Vancouver	Canada	BC Lions, Vancouver Whitecaps	1993	Canadian football, association football
	Ebbets Field	32,000	Brooklyn	United States	Brooklyn Dodgers	1960	Baseball
	Baker Field	32,000	New York	United States	Columbia Lions	1982	American football
	Fujiidera Stadium	32,000	Osaka	Japan	Kintetsu Buffaloes	2005	Baseball
	Anlaby Road	32,000	Hull	England	Hull City A.F.C.	1939	Association football
	Robert Rice Stadium	32,000	Salt Lake City	United States	Utah Utes football	1997	American football
	Hiroshima Municipal Stadium	31,984	Hiroshima	Japan	Hiroshima Toyo Carp	2010	Baseball
	Rutgers Stadium	31,219	Piscataway	United States	Rutgers Scarlet Knights	1993	American football
	Sportsman's Park	30,500	St. Louis	United States	St. Louis Cardinals, St. Louis Browns	1966	Baseball
	Wedaustadion	30,112	Duisburg	Germany	MSV Duisburg	2003	Association football
	Abbasiyyin Stadium	30,000	Damascus	Syria	Al-Jaish, Al-Wahda, Al Majd	2013	Association football
	Empire Stadium	30,000	Gżira	Malta	Malta national football team	1981	Association football
	Fouts Field	30,000	Denton	United States	North Texas Mean Green	2010	American football
	Muntz Street	30,000	Birmingham	England	Small Heath F.C.	1907	Association football
	Roker Park	30,000	Sunderland	England	Sunderland A.F.C.	1997	Association football
	Stade Richter	30,000	Montpellier	France	Montpellier HSC	1990	Association football
	Stadio Filadelfia	30,000	Turin	Italy	Torino F.C.	1998	Association football
	Stadionul Municipal	30,000	Brașov	Romania		2008	Association football
	Cartier Field	30,000	Notre Dame, Indiana	United States	Notre Dame Fighting Irish	1930	American football
	DU Stadium	30,000	Denver	United States	Denver Pioneers	1962	American football
	New Beaver Field	30,000	University Park	United States	Penn State Nittany Lions	1959	American football
	Dongdaemun Stadium	30,000	Seoul	South Korea	Korea Republic national football team	2008	Association football
	Estadio Racing Club	30,000	Buenos Aires	Argentina	Racing Club de Avellaneda	1950	Association football
	Estadio Sportivo Barracas	30,000	Buenos Aires	Argentina		1950	Association football
	Tehelné pole	30,000	Bratislava	Slovakia	Slovan Bratislava	2010	Association football
	Iowa Field	30,000	Iowa City	United States	Iowa Hawkeyes	1928	American football
	Honsellstrasse Stadion	30,000	Karlsruhe	Germany	VfB Mühlburg	1959	Association football
	Metalurh Stadium	29,783	Kryvyi Rih	Ukraine	FC Kryvbas Kryvyi Rih	2021	Association football
	Muirton Park	29,972	Perth	Scotland	St Johnstone F.C.	1989	Association football
	Stadion De Meer	29,500	Amsterdam	Netherlands	AFC Ajax	1996	Association football
	Carisbrook	29,000	Dunedin	New Zealand	Highlanders (to 2011), Otago Rugby Football Union (to 2011), Otago cricket team (to mid-2000s decade), Otago United (to 2008)	2011	Rugby union, cricket, association football
	Douglas Park	28,690	Hamilton	Scotland	Hamilton Academical F.C., Clyde F.C.	1994	Association football
	Stadionul Steaua	28,365	Bucharest	Romania	FC Steaua București, Romania national football team*	2018	Association football
	Nikos Goumas Stadium	27,729	Nea Filadelfeia	Greece	AEK Athens	2003	Association football
	Paloma Mizuho Stadium	27,000	Nagoya	Japan	Nagoya Grampus	2021	Association football and athletics
	Ayresome Park	26,667	Middlesbrough	England	Middlesbrough F.C.	1995	Association football
	Diekman Stadion	26,500	Enschede	Netherlands	FC Twente	1998	Association football
	Willows Sports Complex	26,500	Townsville	Australia	North Queensland Cowboys	2023	Rugby league
	New Cross Stadium	26,000	London	England	New Cross Rangers, Millwall F.C.	1975	Speedway, association football
	The Nest	25,037	Norwich	England	Norwich City F.C.	1935	Association football
	Ahmed bin Ali Stadium (2003)	25,000	Al Rayyan	Qatar	Al-Rayyan SC	2014	Association football
	Burnden Park	25,000	Bolton	England	Bolton Wanderers F.C.	1997	Association football
	Sheffield Park	25,000	Uckfield	England		1909	Cricket
	Don Valley Stadium	25,000	Sheffield	England	1991 Summer Universiade, Sheffield Eagles, Rotherham United F.C., BritBowl (2000–2007 and 2012)	2013	Athletics, Rugby League, Association football, American Football
	Parramatta Stadium	24,000	Parramatta	Australia	Parramatta Eels, Western Sydney Wanderers FC	2016	Rugby league, association football
	Bulgarian Army Stadium	22,995	Sofia	Bulgaria	CSKA Sofia	2023	Association football
	Stadion Oosterpark	22,000	Groningen	Netherlands	FC Groningen	2006	Association football
	Linzer Stadion	21,005	Linz	Austria	BW Linz, LASK	2021	Association football, athletics
	Alkmaarderhout	20,000	Alkmaar	Netherlands	AZ Alkmaar	2006	Association football
	Estádio do Lumiar	20,000	Lisbon	Portugal	Sporting Clube de Portugal	1956	Association football
	NAC Stadion	20,000	Breda	Netherlands	NAC Breda	1996	Association football
	Nieuw Monnikenhuize	18,000	Arnhem	Netherlands	SBV Vitesse	1998	Association football
	Market Square Arena	16,530	Indianapolis	United States	Indiana Pacers	1999	Basketball, hockey
	Qemal Stafa Stadium	16,230	Tirana	Albania	Dinamo Tirana, Partizani Tirana, Albania national football team	2016	Association football, athletics
	Stadionul Farul	15,520	Constanța	Romania	Farul Constanța	2022	Association football, athletics
	Stadionul Nicolae Dobrin	15,170	Pitești	Romania	Argeș Pitești	2023	Association football
	Žalgiris Stadium	15,029	Vilnius	Lithuania	Žalgiris Vilnius, REO Vilnius	2011	Association football, athletics

== Ancient past stadiums ==
Stadium	Capacity	City	Country	Tenant	Closed	Sport
Circus Maximus	150,000	Rome	Roman Empire	Red, White, Blue and Green, briefly Gold	early 600s	Chariot Racing, Ludi, Public Games
Hippodrome of Constantinople	100,000	Constantinople	Byzantine Empire	Red, White, Blue, Green	after 1204	Chariot Racing
Colosseum	65,000	Rome	Roman Empire	Red, White, Blue, Green, briefly Gold	early 600s	Chariot Racing, Ludi, Public Games, Gladiatorial

== See also ==
- List of stadiums
- List of stadiums by capacity
- List of indoor arenas
- List of African stadiums by capacity
- List of Asian stadiums by capacity
- List of European stadiums by capacity
- List of North American stadiums by capacity
- List of Oceanian stadiums by capacity
- List of South American stadiums by capacity
- List of association football stadiums by capacity
- List of association football stadiums by country
- List of American football stadiums by capacity
- List of rugby union stadiums by capacity
- List of Gaelic Athletic Association stadiums
- List of tennis stadiums by capacity
- List of attendance figures at domestic professional sports leagues
- List of sporting venues with a highest attendance of 100,000 or more
- List of covered stadiums by capacity
- List of future stadiums
