= Old Brooklyn =

Neighborhood of Cleveland, Ohio, United States

Coordinates: 41.431559°N 81.702332°W

- Neighborhood of Cleveland
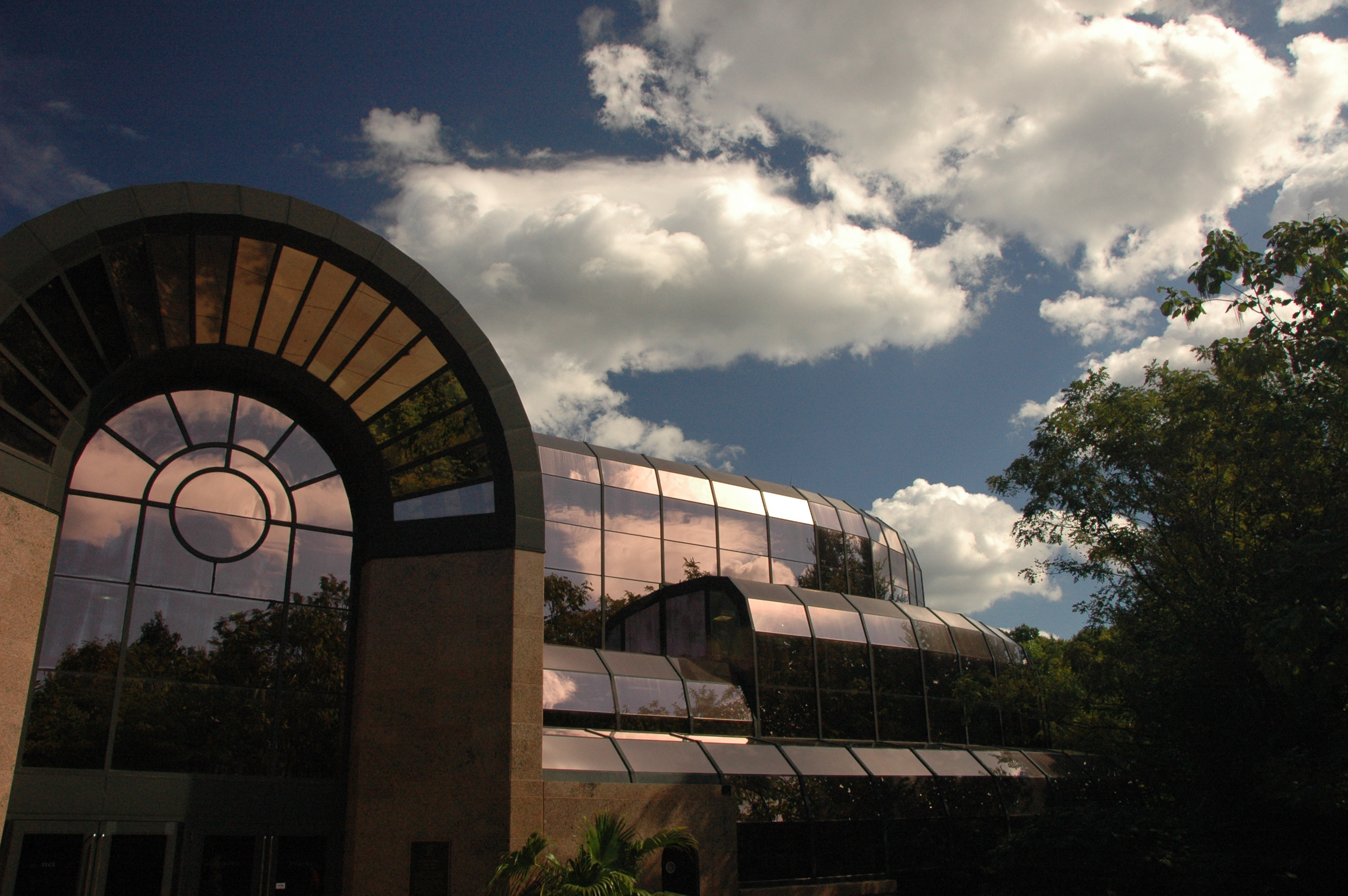
- Exterior of The RainForest of the Cleveland Metroparks Zoo

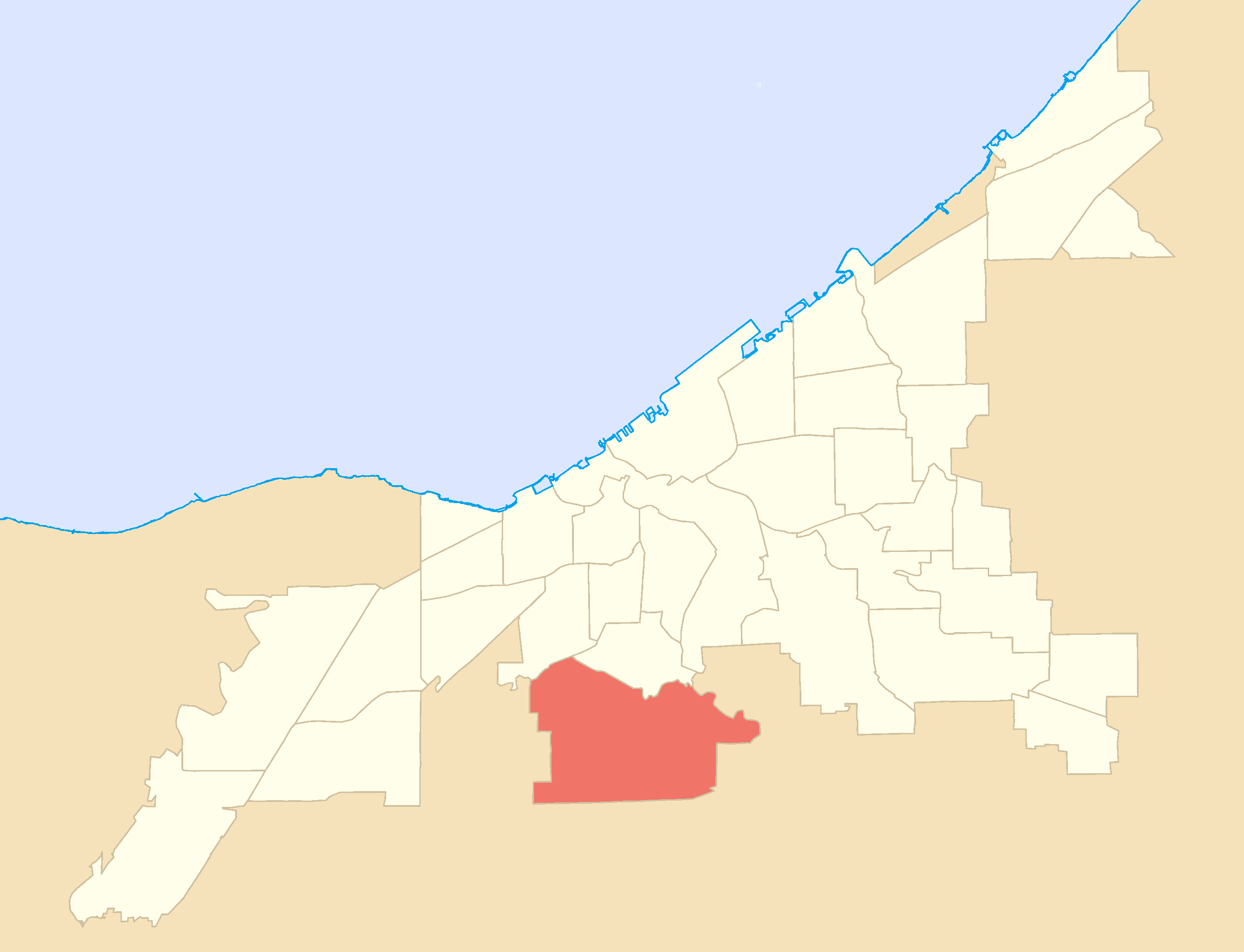
- Country: United States
- State: Ohio
- County: Cuyahoga
- City: Cleveland

Population (2020)
  - Total: 32,813

Demographics
  - White: 73.8%
  - Black: 9.9%
  - Hispanic (of any race): 19.6%
  - Asian and Pacific Islander: 2.6%
  - Mixed and Other: 13.7%
- Time zone: UTC-5 (EST)
  - Summer (DST): UTC-4 (EDT)
- ZIP Codes: parts of 44109, 44144 and 44134
- Area code: 216
- Median income: $39,591
- Source: 2020 U.S. Census, City Planning Commission of Cleveland

Old Brooklyn is a neighborhood on the West Side of Cleveland, Ohio, United States, located approximately five miles south of downtown Cleveland. It extends east-to-west from the Cuyahoga River to the city of Brooklyn and north-to-south from the Brookside Park Valley to the city of Parma. It is home to the Cleveland Metroparks, including the Cleveland Zoo; the Jesse Owens tree at James Ford Rhodes High School; and the Benjamin Franklin Community Garden, the largest urban community garden in Cuyahoga County. Old Brooklyn has recently adopted the slogan "Old Brooklyn, a great place to grow" to commemorate its history and potential growth.

== History ==
The first instance of European habitation in the Old Brooklyn vicinity occurred in 1790, when fur trader Joseph Du Shattar established a trading post on the west bank of the Cuyahoga River, across from the area that became Newburgh.

Originally a portion of Brooklyn Township, the area was settled permanently in 1814 as the hamlet of Brighton, centered at the present-day intersection of Pearl and Broadview Roads. The Brighton area was incorporated as South Brooklyn Village in 1889 and then annexed with other surrounding villages by the City of Cleveland during the years of 1905–1927.

During the late 1880s, farmers in Old Brooklyn's Schaaf Road area (also known as South Hills) and the neighboring Village of Brooklyn Heights were among the first in the Midwest to use greenhouses to cultivate vegetables. By the 1920s the neighborhood was one of the nation's leading producers of greenhouse vegetables, with more than 100 acres (0.40 km^{2}) under glass. Most of the greenhouses were displaced, beginning about 1960, by new housing and the construction of Ohio Rt. 176 (Jennings Freeway).

Commercial development in Old Brooklyn reached its apex during the period of 1920–1960. Shopping districts spread along Pearl, Broadview, and State Roads and were followed, after World War II, by the development of shopping plazas at the intersections of Memphis-Fulton, Broadview-Brookpark, and Pearl-Brookpark. The original Honey Hut ice cream shop, a favorite of many West-siders, can be found on State Road near the south end of the community.

The most ambitious period of residential construction extended from the early 20th century to the 1950s. During the 1980s and 1990s, residential development experienced a resurgence, particularly in the South Hills and Jennings Road areas. Housing values in Old Brooklyn, today, are among the highest within Cleveland proper.

== Landmarks ==
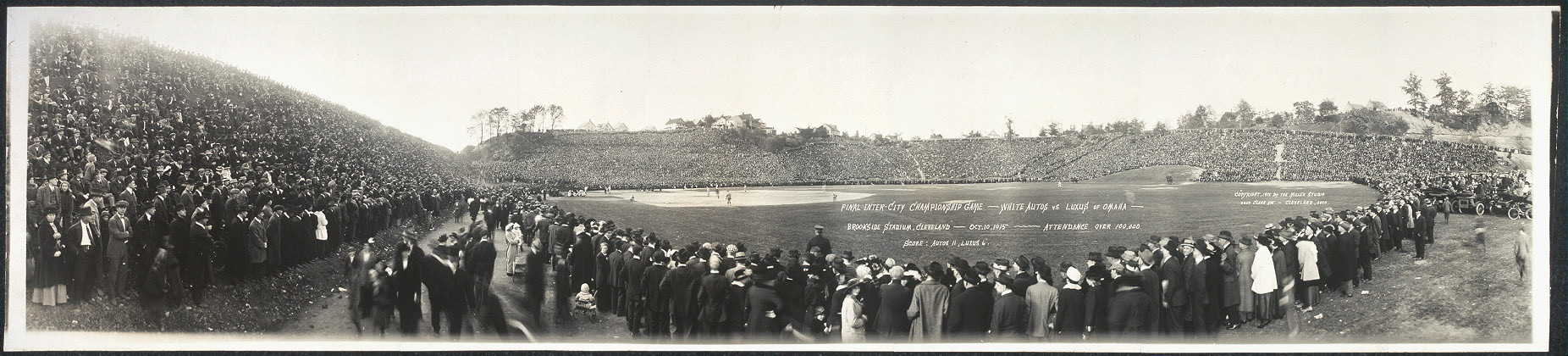
White Autos of Cleveland vs. Luxus of Omaha, 1915

Old Brooklyn's most notable landmark, the Cleveland Metroparks Zoo, was created in 1907 when Cleveland's Park Board relocated the Zoo from University Circle on Cleveland's east side to Brookside Park. The 145-acre park lies entirely within Old Brooklyn and is one of the 16 nature preserve reservations of the Cleveland Metroparks system.

Brookside Park also has a place in sporting lore, having hosted the reputedly largest baseball crowd in Cleveland's history, when the White Autos of Cleveland met Omaha in the World Amateur Baseball Championship. On October 10, 1915, a reported crowd of 115,000 sprawled along and below the park's northern bluff, directly west of today's Fulton Road Bridge, and cheered as the home team seized the day.

The Jeremiah Gates Home, built in 1820 and located at 3506 Memphis Avenue, is believed to be the oldest residence in Old Brooklyn. Other notable landmarks include the Brooklyn-Brighton Bridge, the Estabrook Recreation Center, and the Italian Gothic-style Our Lady of Good Counsel Church (now called Mary Queen of Peace) atop Pearl Road Hill.

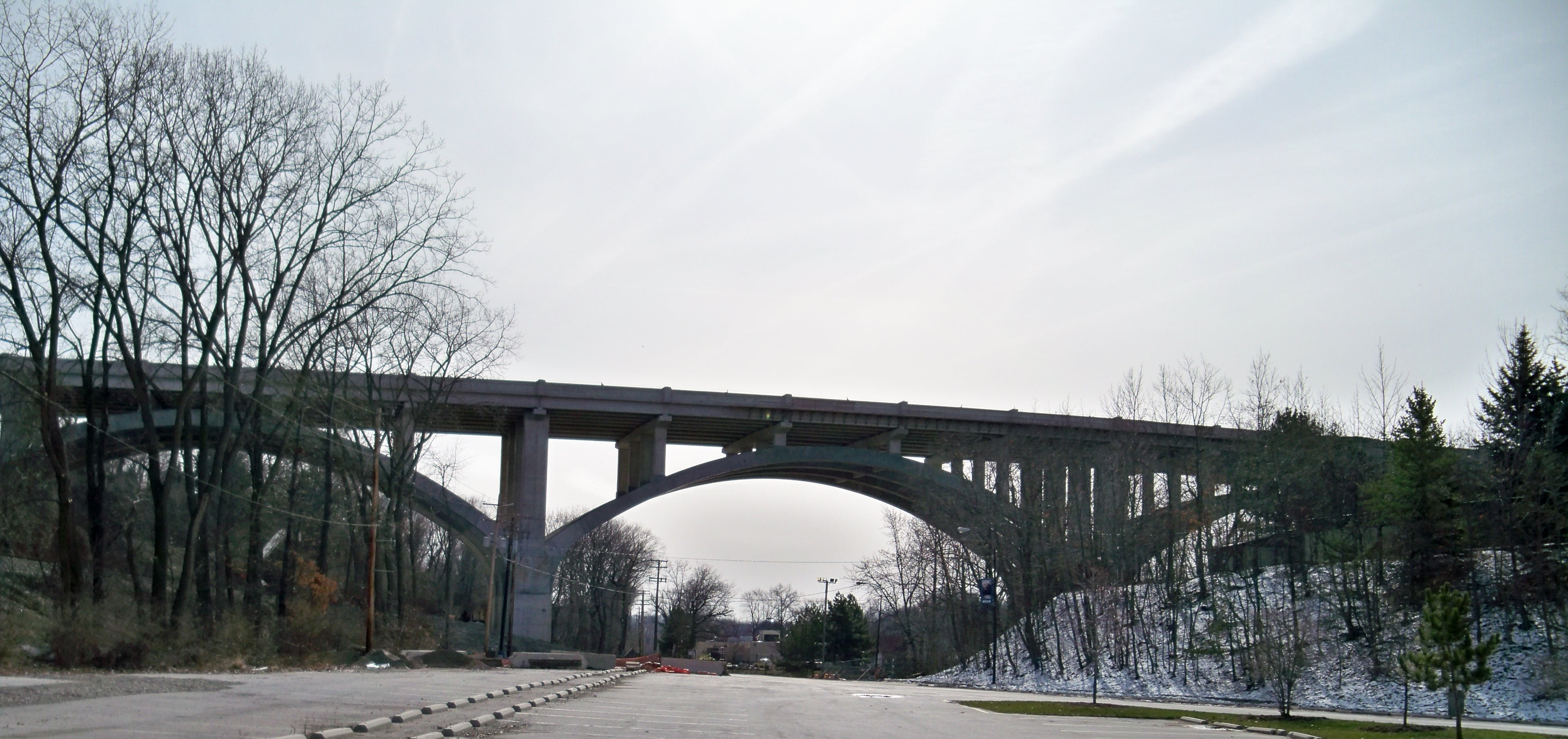
The new Fulton Road Bridge

== Education ==
Old Brooklyn is served by the Cleveland Metropolitan School District. Public schools in the neighborhood include: Charles A. Mooney School, William C. Bryant Elementary, Benjamin Franklin Elementary, William Rainey Harper Elementary, James Ford Rhodes High, Facing History New Tech (which shares a campus with Mooney).

Notable charter schools in the neighborhood include: Cleveland Preparatory Academy, and Constellation Schools: Old Brooklyn Community Elementary and Middle.

The Catholic Diocese of Cleveland runs Mary Queen of Peace Elementary School, St. Mary’s Byzantine Catholic School, and St. Leo the Great School. Luther Memorial School is a Lutheran school also active in the neighborhood.

== Natives of Old Brooklyn ==
The neighborhood's secondary students generally attend James Ford Rhodes High School, whose graduates include 1944 Heisman Trophy winner Les Horvath, anti-establishment poet D. A. Levy, and television star Drew Carey.The Drew Carey Show's "Warsaw Tavern" was patterned after a bar near the Memphis-Fulton intersection, which hosts one of the highest concentrations of bars and restaurants in Greater Cleveland.

== Demographics ==
Old Brooklyn encompasses all of Cleveland's Ward 13, and the southwestern portion of Ward 12.

== Recent and future developments ==
The Treadway Creek Greenway Restoration project, completed in 2008, restored and preserved 21 acres (0.085 km^{2}) of riparian corridor and open space along Treadway Creek. The project included the construction of a multi-purpose trail connecting Harmody Park to the Ohio and Erie Canal National Heritage Corridor's Towpath Trail. Other plans include a connector linking the Towpath Trail with the Cleveland Metroparks Zoo, as well as transit service and streetscape improvements. In 2020, the Cleveland Metroparks approved development of a 26-acre park space named Brighton Park, with a connection to the trails from the Towpath to the Zoo, atop the former Henninger Landfill site.
