= Strahov =

District of Prague, Czech Republic

Coordinates: 50.086°N 14.390°E

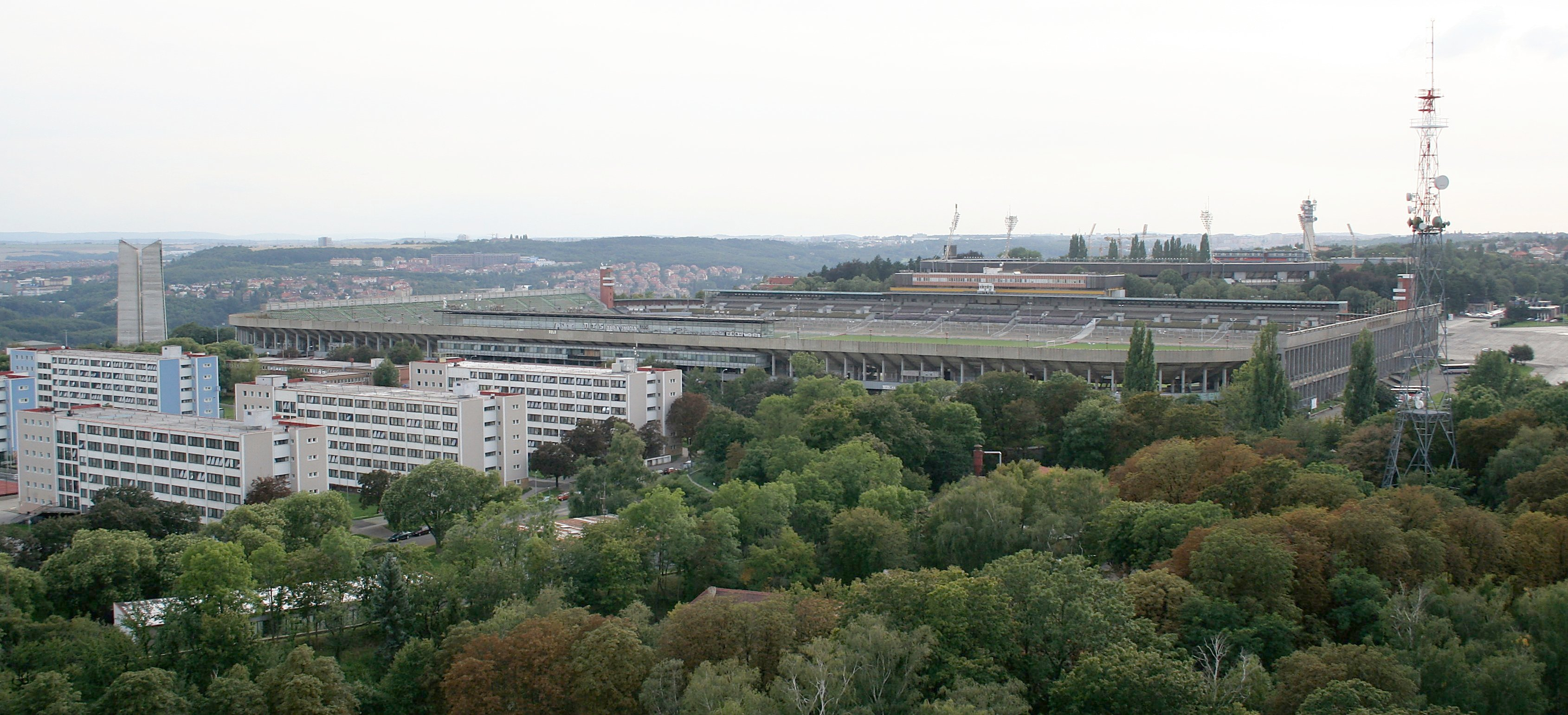
View over Strahov -The stadium and university accommodation are clearly visible.

Strahov (Czech pronunciation: [ˈstraɦof]) is a district of Prague in the Czech Republic. It lies on the west bank of the Vltava, west of Petřín hill, Malá Strana and Hradčany. It is bordered by the districts of Břevnov, Smíchov, Košíře, Střešovice and Malá Strana.

== Description ==
Strahov is home to the premonstratensian Strahov Monastery (Czech: Strahovský klášter), Štefánik's Observatory (Czech: Štefánikova hvězdárna) and Great Strahov Stadium (Czech: Velký strahovský stadion), a former sports stadium that was once the largest in the world and famously hosted the spartakiáda gatherings. A smaller stadium, Stadion Evžena Rošického, currently home to football club SK Sparta Krč is in Strahov, as is a large accommodation block for the Czech Technical University in Prague.

In Communist times, a radio frequency jammer was situated in the district to block the broadcasts of Radio Free Europe. It was a featured location in the game Tomb Raider: The Angel of Darkness (2003).

== Gallery ==
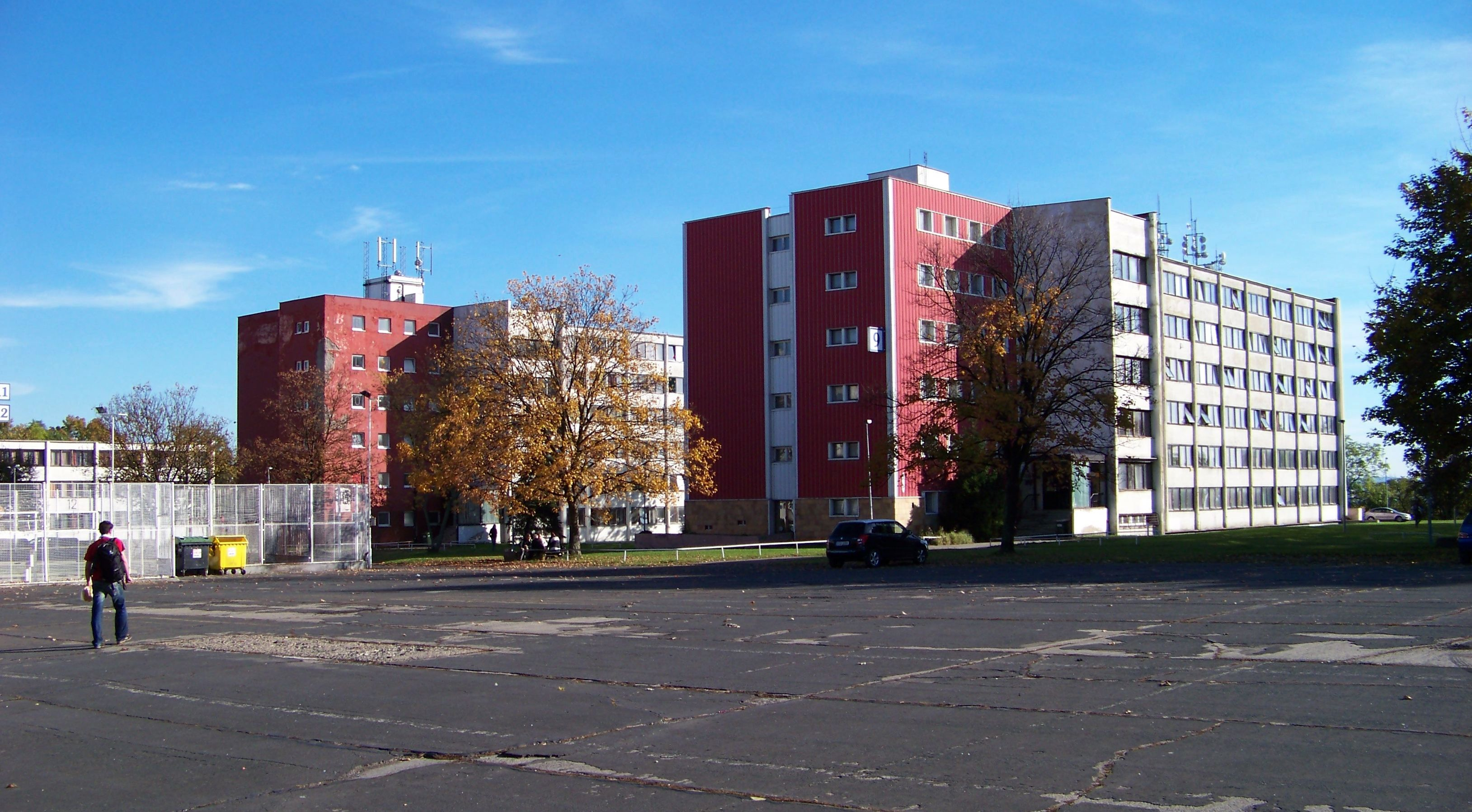
Strahov dormitories of ČVUT

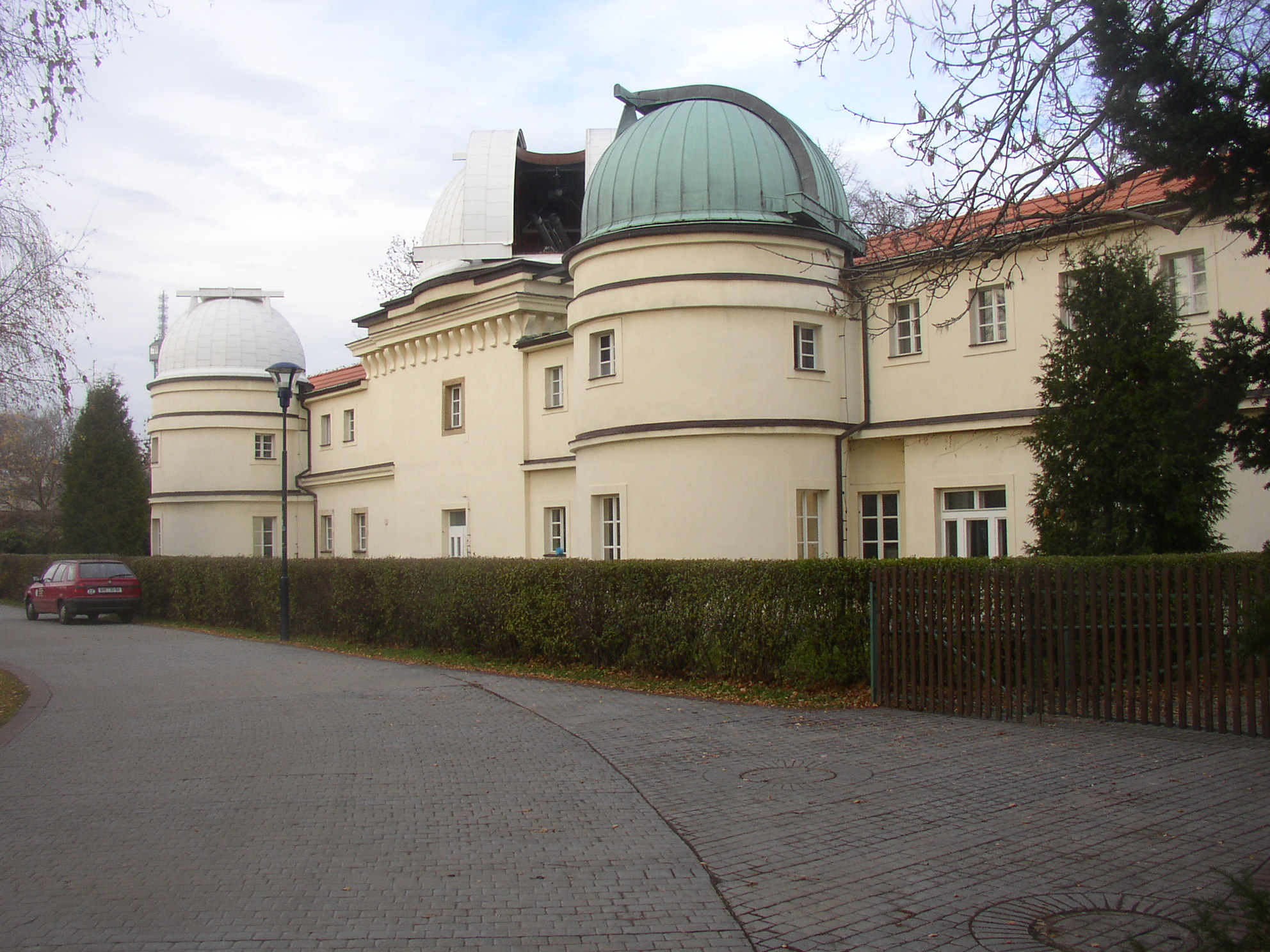
Štefánik's Observatory from the south.

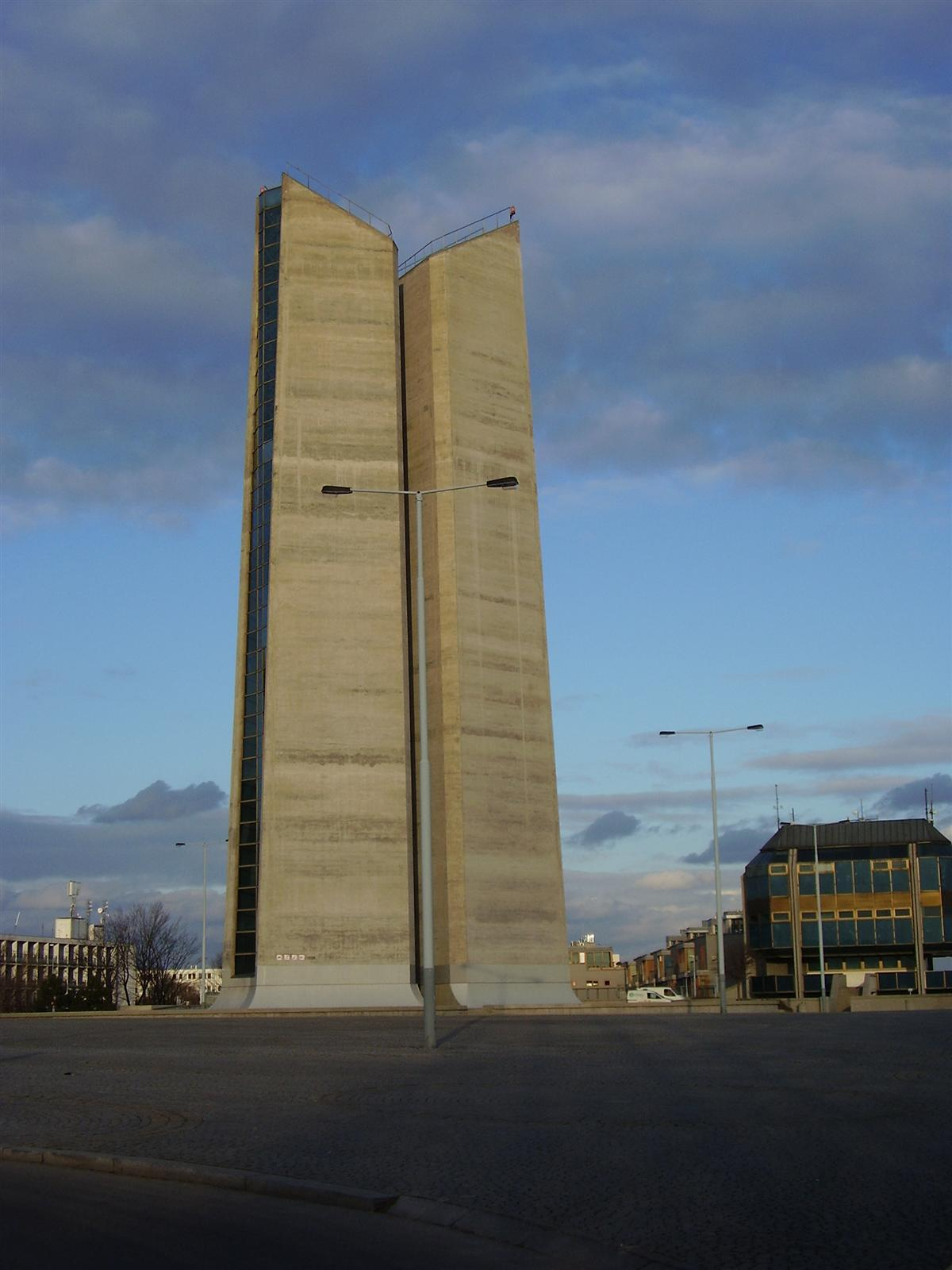
Ventilation tower for the tunnel running under Strahov.

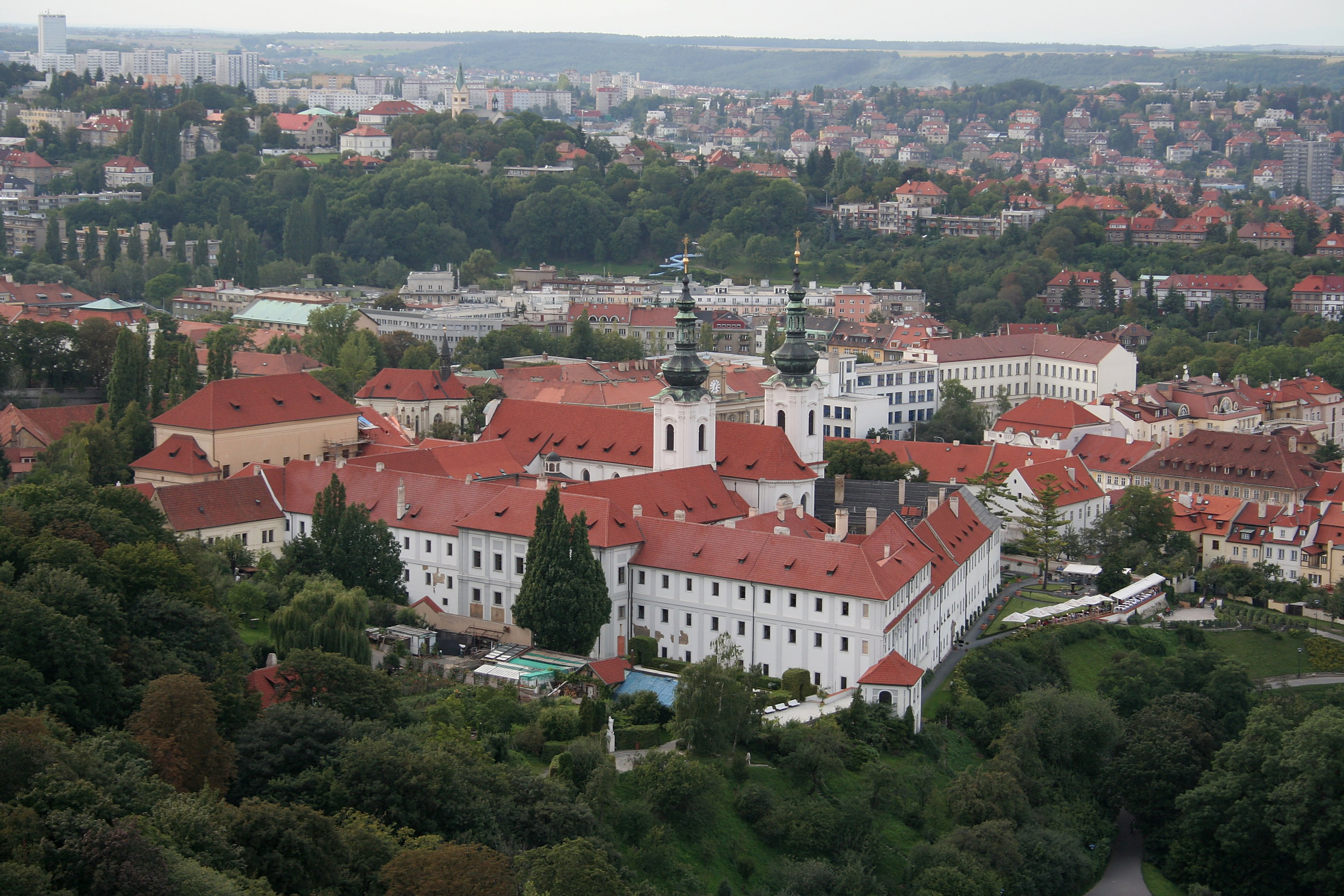
Strahov Monastery
