= Flower Buds =

2011 film

- Film poster
- Directed by: Zdeněk Jiráský
- Written by: Zdeněk Jiráský
- Produced by: Viktor Schwarcz
- Starring: Vladimír Javorský
- Cinematography: Vladimír Smutný
- Release date: 1 December 2011
- Running time: 90 minutes
- Country: Czech Republic
- Language: Czech

Flower Buds (Czech: Poupata) is a 2011 Czech drama film written and directed by Zdeněk Jiráský.

== Premise ==
The film is about the Hrdina family, who live in an industrial Czech border town. Jarda Hrdina is a middle-aged railway signalman who is deep in debt from his addiction to slot machines. His wife Kamila, a cleaning lady, is focused on rehearsing a performance of the song "Poupata" ("Flower Buds"), twenty five years after she and her peers performed the routine in the Spartakiad gymnastics festival. Their son Honza, who grows cannabis in his basement, falls in love with a prostitute named Zuzana, and after unsuccessfully asking her out decides to purchase ownership of her. Their daughter Agáta, whose boyfriend Matěj begins using a wheelchair after nearly freezing to death while drunk, is dealing with an unplanned pregnancy, and can only bring herself to tell her close friend Magda.

== Cast ==
- Vladimír Javorský as Jarda
- Malgorzata Pikus as Kamila
- Marika Šoposká as Agáta
- Miroslav Pánek as Honza
- Natalie Řehořová as Magda
- Aneta Krejčíková as Zuzana
