= Poupata (song) =

Song by Michal David
- Released: February 1985
- Label: Supraphon
- Songwriter: Jaroslav Machek
- Composer: František Janeček

"Poupata" ("Flower Buds") is a Czechoslovak pop song performed by Michal David that was associated with the 1985 Spartakiad mass gymnastics festival. The song was used as the accompaniment for the routine performed by older schoolgirls (starší žákyně) aged 11–15, and subsequently became a national cultural icon.

== Production and release ==
The song was composed by František Janeček with lyrics by Jaroslav Machek. Vocals were by Michal David, accompanied by the children's choir Bambini di Praga and Janeček's group Kroky Františka Janečka. Commissioned by the Czechoslovak government specifically for the 1985 Spartakiad, it was recorded in November 1984 and released by the state record label Supraphon as a single in February 1985.

== Content ==
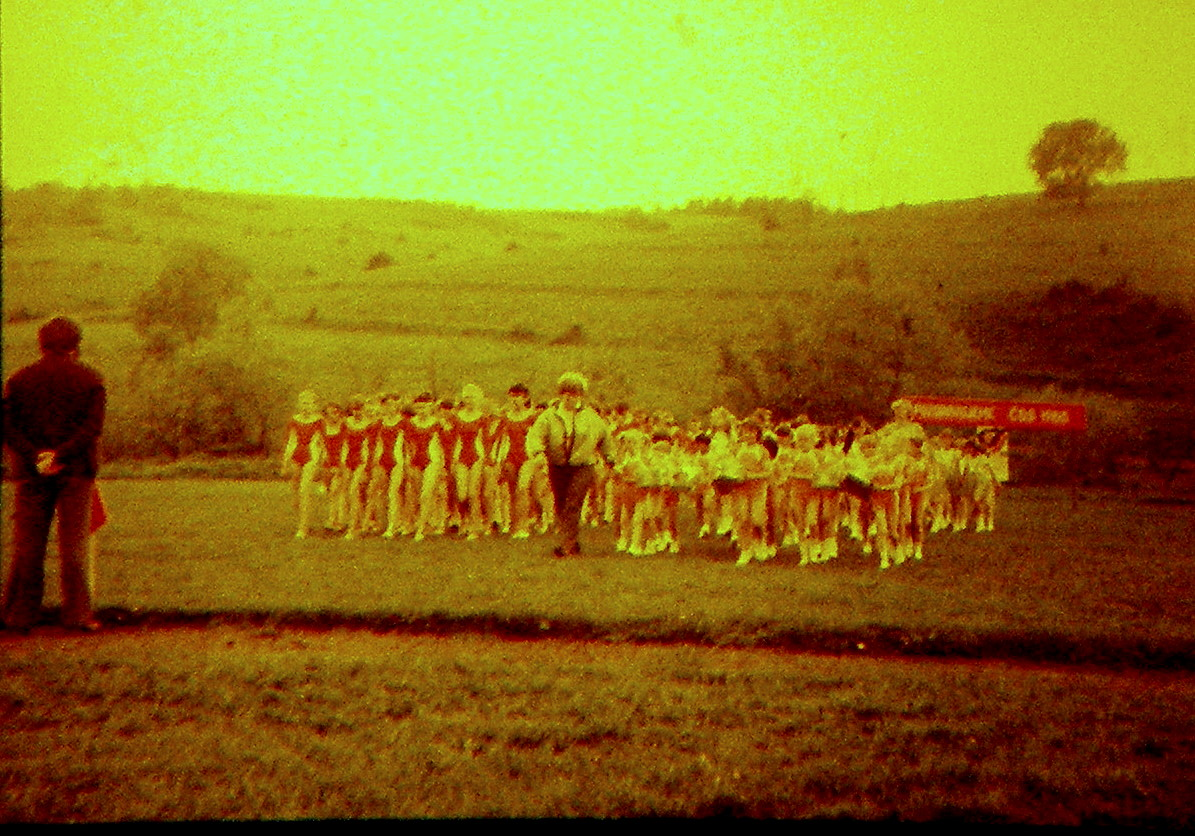
Local round of the 1985 Spartakiad, including girls in the red Poupata routine costume (left).

The lyrics are about young girls or "flower buds" having bright futures as they grow up and "bloom" into roses. The chorus repeats the importance of succeeding at the things "that should be succeeded at". The song combines elements of disco and brass band music.

At the 1985 Spartakiad, which took place on 27–30 June at the Great Strahov Stadium, 13,824 girls danced to the song wearing red and white leotards and headbands.

== Legacy ==
The song became a hit within Czechoslovakia in the 1980s and is considered a prominent symbol of both the Spartakiad and the normalization era of communist rule. It has remained popular long after the fall of communism, and for example saw use in an insurance company commercial.

The 2011 film Poupata shares the name of the song, with a major plot point involving one of the characters learning the dance routine years after she had performed it.
