= Brookside Stadium =

Stadium in Cleveland, Ohio

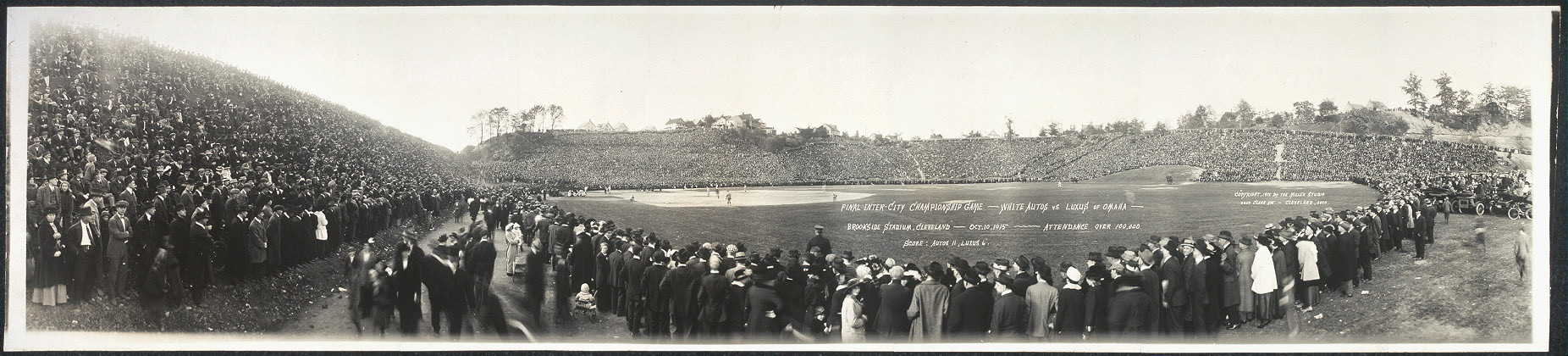
- Interactive map of Brookside Stadium
- Former names: Brookside Bowl, Brookside Diamond #1
- Location: Cleveland, Ohio
- Coordinates: 41.4524°N 81.7177°W
- Operator: City of Cleveland
- Capacity: unknown (present), 115,000 (historic)
- Surface: Natural grass
- Current use: None

Construction
- Opened: 1894-1896
- Years active: 1894-2007

Tenants
- Cleveland Baseball Federation, Various Amateur Baseball and Softball Leagues

Brookside Stadium is a natural amphitheater stadium located in Cleveland, Ohio, primarily used for baseball, softball and American football. The stadium is known for hosting a series of amateur baseball championships in the early 20th century which set a variety of attendance records for amateur sports.

== History ==
The natural amphitheater that makes up what is now Brookside Stadium, and lands throughout all of Brookside Park emerged following the retreat of ice-age glaciers. The land containing the stadium was a part of the original purchase to establish the Cleveland Metroparks system in 1894.

=== Planning and construction ===
In October 1908, Cleveland City Clerk Peter Witt made a presentation to the Cleveland Athletic Club, suggesting to the club's membership that Brookside Park needed an athletic complex to take advantage of the gift of the natural terrain. Witt envisioned a 100,000-seat stadium that would be the "largest meeting place in the world" to attract the 1912 Olympic Games.

The plan was to begin with a smaller section of seating for 25,000, which would eventually be expanded to encompass the entire hillside and surround a 750-foot by 500-foot athletic field. By the time Witt made his appeal to the Athletic Club, the hillsides had already been graded and leveled by the city's parks department. Witt claimed that by November 1908 the first section of concrete seating would be installed and that the entire stadium would be completed within a year. However, only a portion of this plan was ultimately realized.

=== Early years ===
Anecdotal evidence suggests that Brookside Stadium opened sometime between 1894 and 1896. On May 2, 1909, Brookside Stadium hosted a double-header for opening day of the Cleveland League, the first game between the Ohio A C's versus the Commadores and the second between McWatters-Dolan and the Treadways.

The official dedication ceremony for Brookside Stadium took place on May 29, 1909, and consisted of a variety of sporting events, including a 15-mile street race originating in Gordon Park and finishing on the main field, track and field competitions (shot put, pole vaulting, etc.) involving 152 participants representing 12 gymnasiums, an act by Minnie the Brookside elephant who performed between events, and a concert from Rossini's band.

=== Notable games ===
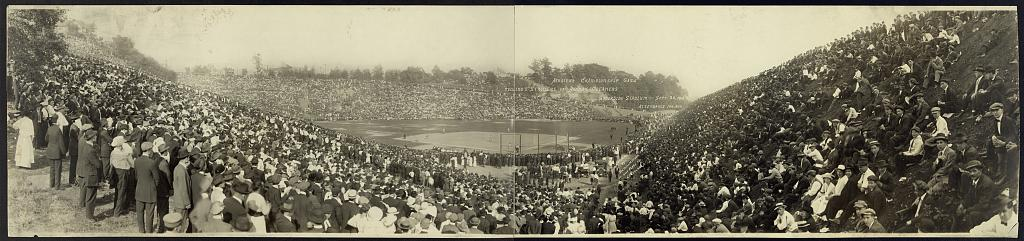
Telling's Strollers vs. Hanna's Cleaners, September 20, 1914

Brookside Stadium held a number of amateur sporting events over the next several years. In 1914 and 1915, Brookside Stadium hosted three all amateur baseball championships which set a variety of attendance records up to that point.

On September 20, 1914, the Telling Strollers beat Hanna's Cleaners (Hanna Street Cleaners) 8 to 3 in front of an estimated audience of 100,000.

On October 3, 1915, the White Autos played a team from Johnstown, Pennsylvania to a crowd of 100,000 on-lookers.

On October 10, 1915, the White Autos beat Omaha Luxus 11 to 6 in front of an estimated crowd of 115,000.

These matches, sponsored by local businesses, were free to the public and drew attendees from all sides of the city.

Brookside Stadium hosted other baseball games with high attendances, including one on September 20, 1914. It also hosted professional football games.

=== Later years ===
Over the subsequent decades, Brookside Stadium hosted a number of events, including sporting matches, community gatherings, and concerts. As professional baseball continued to gain popularity, and economic times changed, the stadium began to be used for more informal sporting events, such as youth league play and practice. Ultimately, over the next half-century, the stadiums condition deteriorated, and the field fell into disrepair.

In the early 1980s, a dedicated group of citizens (many of whom were descendants of those who played at Brookside or who played there themselves) lobbied the Cleveland City Council to rehabilitate the stadium and have the park designated as a historical site. At the time, the stadium, by then known only as "Diamond #1", was in consideration to become a parking lot for the Cleveland Metroparks Zoo.

During the reconstruction of the Fulton Road Bridge in 2007, Brookside Stadium was used as a staging ground for materials and equipment by the Kokosing Construction Co., which caused significant damage. Upon completion of the bridge, the field was backfilled with clay and spread with grass, leaving it with very poor drainage and ultimately in an unusable state.

== Future of the stadium ==
As a result of recent efforts by the Brookside Stadium Preservation Society, plans are in place to renovate and restore Brookside Stadium. The Preservation Society also compiles the history of the ballpark, as told by area residents and their descendants.
