= Fulton Road Bridge =

Bridges in Cleveland, Ohio, United States

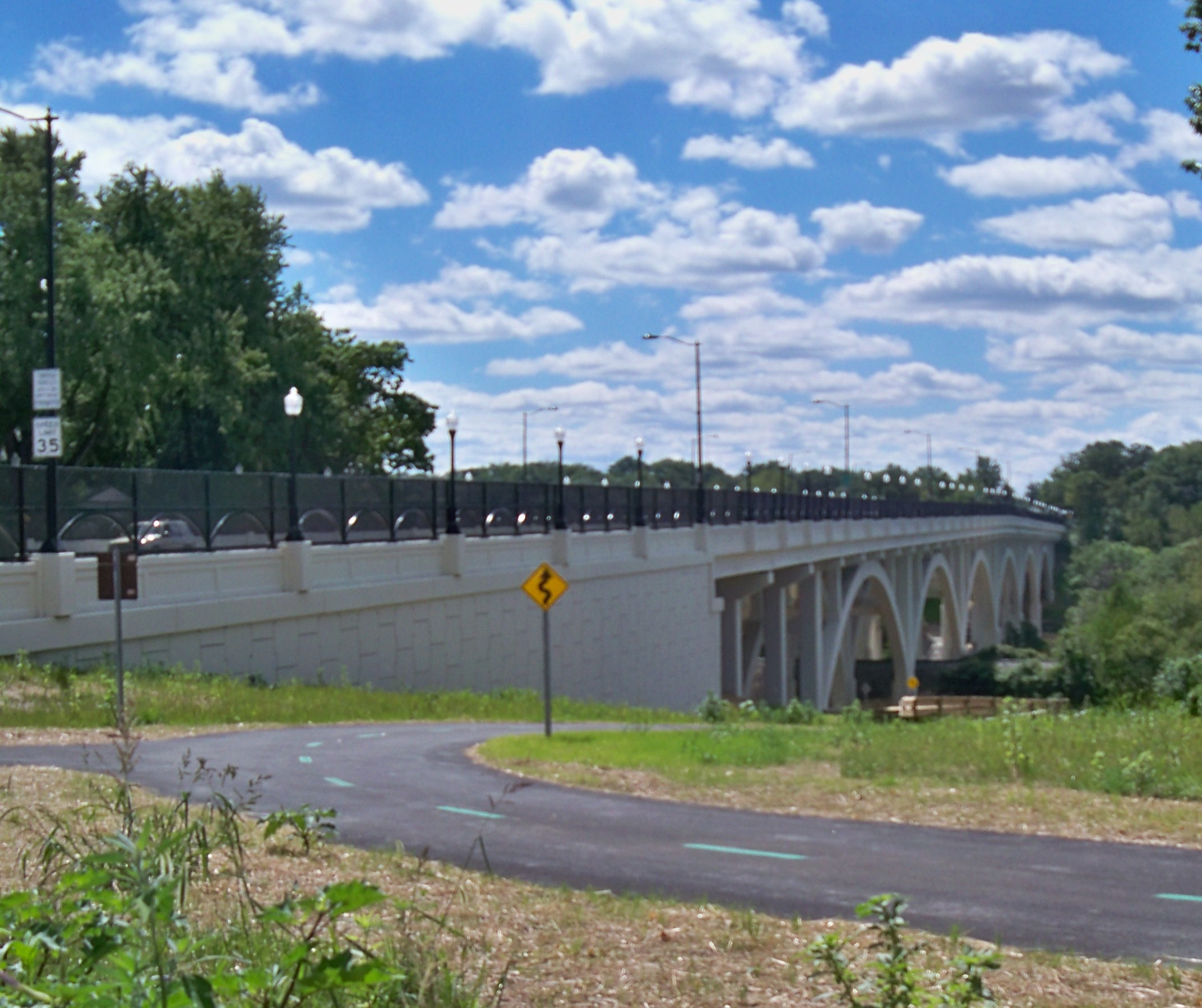
- The span of the replacement bridge, as seen from Denison Ave
- Coordinates: 41.44858°N 81.71710°W
- Carries: 4 lanes of traffic across Fulton Road
- Crosses: Cleveland Metroparks Zoo, Big Creek
- Locale: Cleveland, Ohio
- Maintained by: Ohio Department of Transportation

Characteristics
- Design: Arched
- Total length: 1,583 feet (482 m)
- Width: 81 feet (25 m)
- Height: 100 feet (30 m)

History
- Opened: Original: 1932 / Replacement: 2010
- Closed: Original: 2006

Location
- Interactive map of Fulton Road Bridge

The Fulton Road Bridge is the name of two bridges in Cleveland, Ohio, the original and its replacement. The bridge in the Old Brooklyn neighborhood spans the Cleveland Metroparks Zoo, Big Creek (a Cuyahoga River tributary that runs through the Cleveland Metroparks' Brookside Reservation), John Nagy Boulevard, and Norfolk Southern and CSX railroad tracks.

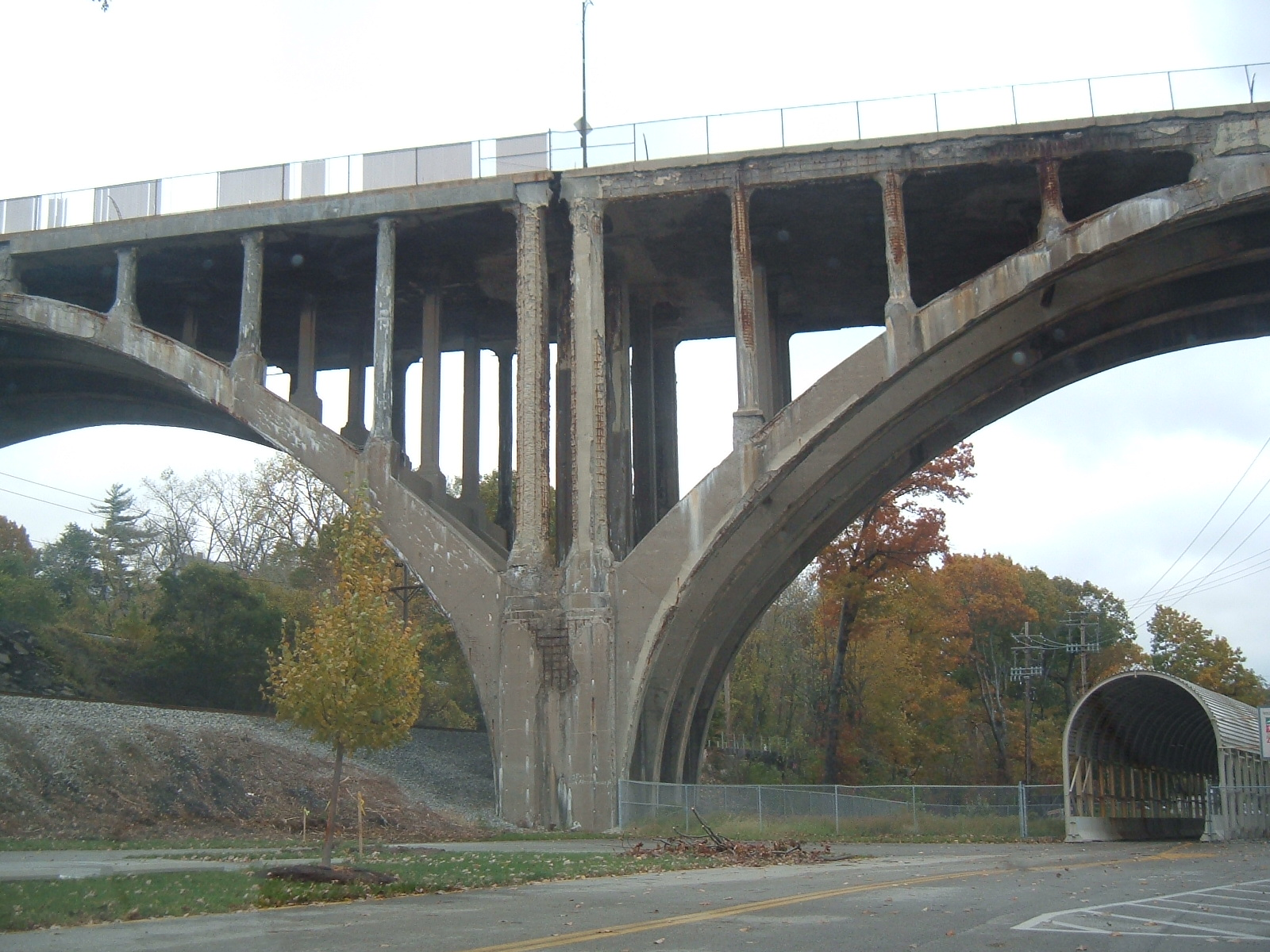
One of the original bridge's arch supports

== The original Fulton Road Bridge ==
The original bridge, constructed in 1932 and dedicated in mid-May of that year, was initially six lanes. Two lanes were later removed, making it into a four-lane bridge. Several years prior to demolition, two more lanes were closed to traffic, but not taken down. The bridge was then two lanes, with two more blocked off, and with a sidewalk on each side. In 1997, three metal canopies were installed under the roadway to prevent debris from falling from the deteriorating bridge onto zoo patrons. The bridge was closed in October 2006 and demolished in 2007.

=== Demolition ===
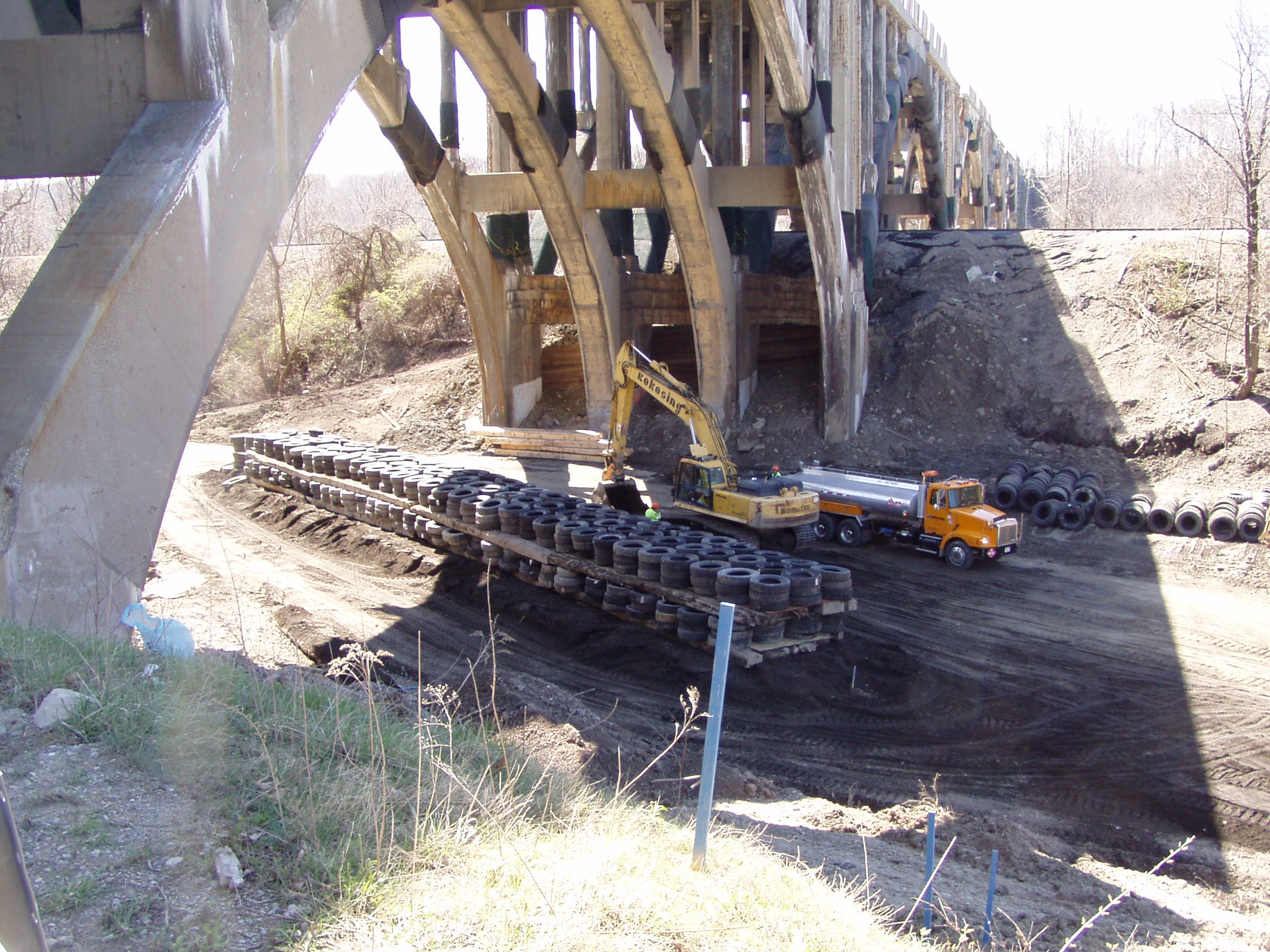
Tires protecting the water main

Before the demolition occurred, the bridge had gone through some deconstruction, mainly of the deck. This was required due to the discovery, in November 2006, of tiles used as waterproofing under the deck which contained asbestos. These tiles had to be removed by a subcontractor before demolition could proceed.

Also prior to the implosion, a major 42” water transmission main, crossing twice underneath the old bridge, was covered by over 1,200 old tires, designed to absorb the shock of the falling bridge deck and protect the main.

The final implosion was scheduled to occur on April 28, 2007, at 8am, but a detonation cable failure resulted in only about one-quarter of the bridge being knocked down.

On May 1, just after 6pm, the remainder of the bridge was demolished, leaving only the arch supports at either end.

== Construction of the new Fulton Road Bridge ==
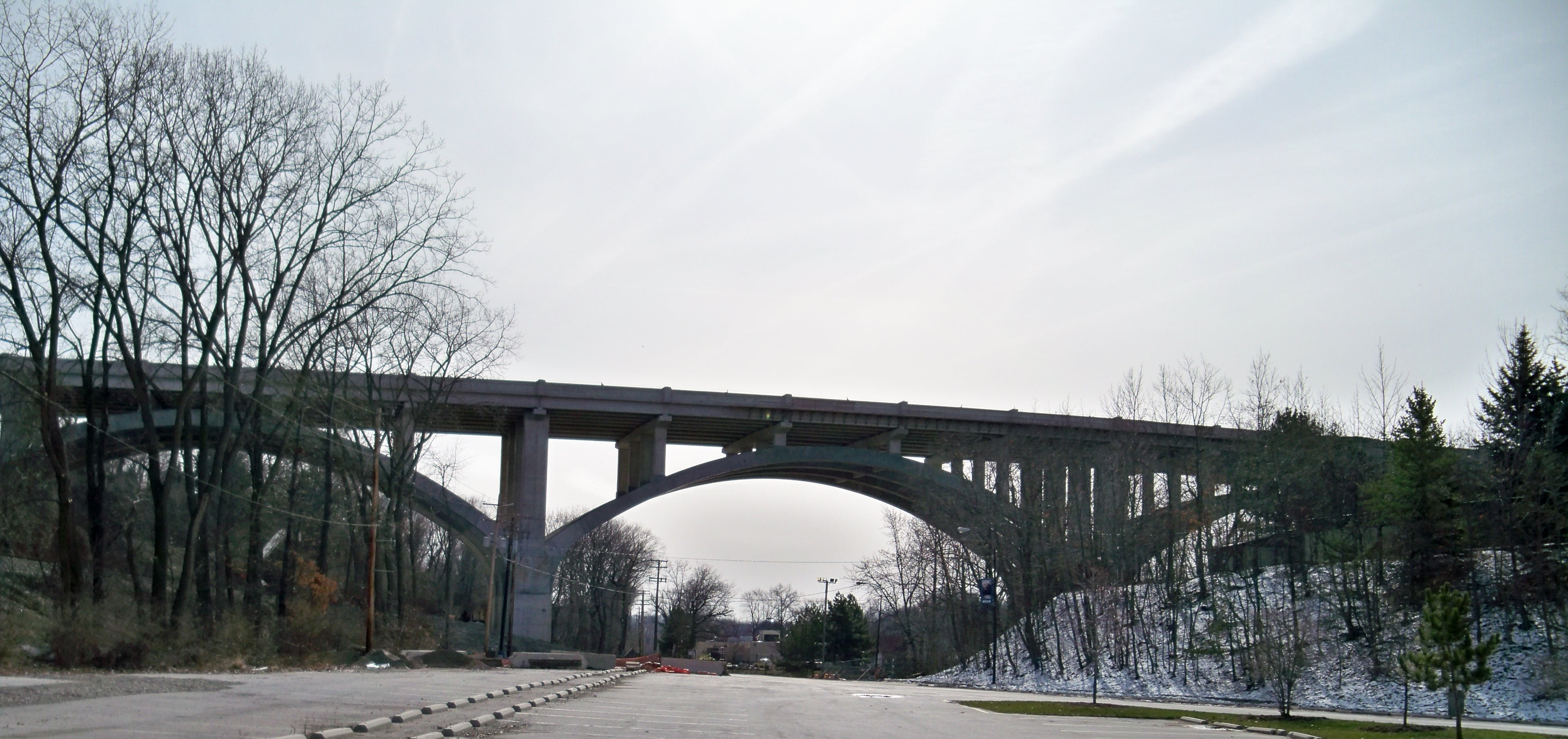
The replacement bridge nearing completion (note similarity in design to original bridge).

The replacement bridge overlooks the Cleveland Metroparks Zoo and spans a historic footbridge, two railroad tracks, a major water main, and several maintenance roads and footpaths, as did the original. It has four traffic lanes, two bicycle lanes, and sidewalks. The new bridge, which includes arch- or Y-styled supports and appears similar to the original, opened on July 9, 2010.

The building contractor for the new bridge, Kokosing Construction Company, estimated the cost of replacing the bridge at $45,859,138.00.

The new structure is an eleven-span, pre-cast, open-spandrel arch bridge. According to the contractor, nearly "1,800 cubic yards of self-leveling mass concrete are contained in the bridge piers. These seven piers were post-tensioned to support the pre-cast arches, which were erected in segments on shoring towers and then post-tensioned as well. Following the erection of the arches, the spandrel columns and caps were poured. Pre-cast concrete beams were also erected to support the bridge deck." The arches were included in the design of the new bridge by popular demand.

There were several delays during the replacement project, some due to weather conditions. The original opening estimate for mid-2009 was pushed back several times, eventually as far as July, 2010, when the new bridge was finally opened for traffic. Cleveland city Councilman Kevin Kelley called the delays "incredibly frustrating", noting they were "beyond reasonable and not fair to merchants" many of whom had gone out of business due to rerouted traffic.
