= Honsellstraße stadium =

Former stadium in Karlsruhe, Germany

Stadion Honsellstraße
- Full name: Stadion Honsellstraße
- Location: Karlsruhe, Germany
- Owner: VfB Mühlburg
- Operator: VfB Mühlburg
- Capacity: 30,000

Construction
- Opened: 1908
- Closed: 1959

Tenant
- VfB Mühlburg

The Honsellstraße stadium (German: Stadion Honsellstraße) is a former 30,000-seat stadium in Karlsruhe, Germany, often used for VfB Mühlburg association football matches.

== History ==
The land was provided to FC Mühlburg by way of lease. The pitch had been laid out in 1907 on what was known as the Holstein Meadow. Since the area was too small for a football pitch on its own, an additional piece of land was leased from the railway. The first sports ground was established in 1908, and the first clubhouse followed a year later. This was later expanded to include bathing and shower facilities, which was considered a rarity at the time.

The stadium was completely destroyed in 1942, but it was rebuilt by 1947. The grounds were even expanded in 1945. The first match held was VfB against the Stuttgarter Kickers on September 7, 1947 (0-3). The new stadium did not have a cinder track and could accommodate 30,000–35,000 people. These were almost exclusively standing areas, with only a few benches available for war-disabled spectators.

On the grounds, there was also a barrack-like building that housed the VfB’s administrative office, changing rooms, and parking spaces for visiting fans' buses.

In the 1952/53 season, VfB Mühlburg merged with FC Phönix to form Karlsruher SC, after which the old Phönix ground was converted into the Wildparkstadion. Until its completion, the KSC too played its home games in the Mühlburg stadium. The last league match there was on April 24, 1955, KSC vs. Eintracht Frankfurt (3-2), and the very last match was a friendly on June 25, 1955, against Inter Milan (2-1). Until its demolition in 1959, the stadium was used by the Mühlburg gymnastics club. The grandstand was dismantled before demolition and stood in the Albgaustadion in Ettlingen until 2018, but was later replaced by a completely new construction.
