= Grugastadion =

Football stadium in Essen, Germany

Coordinates: 51.424°N 6.994°E

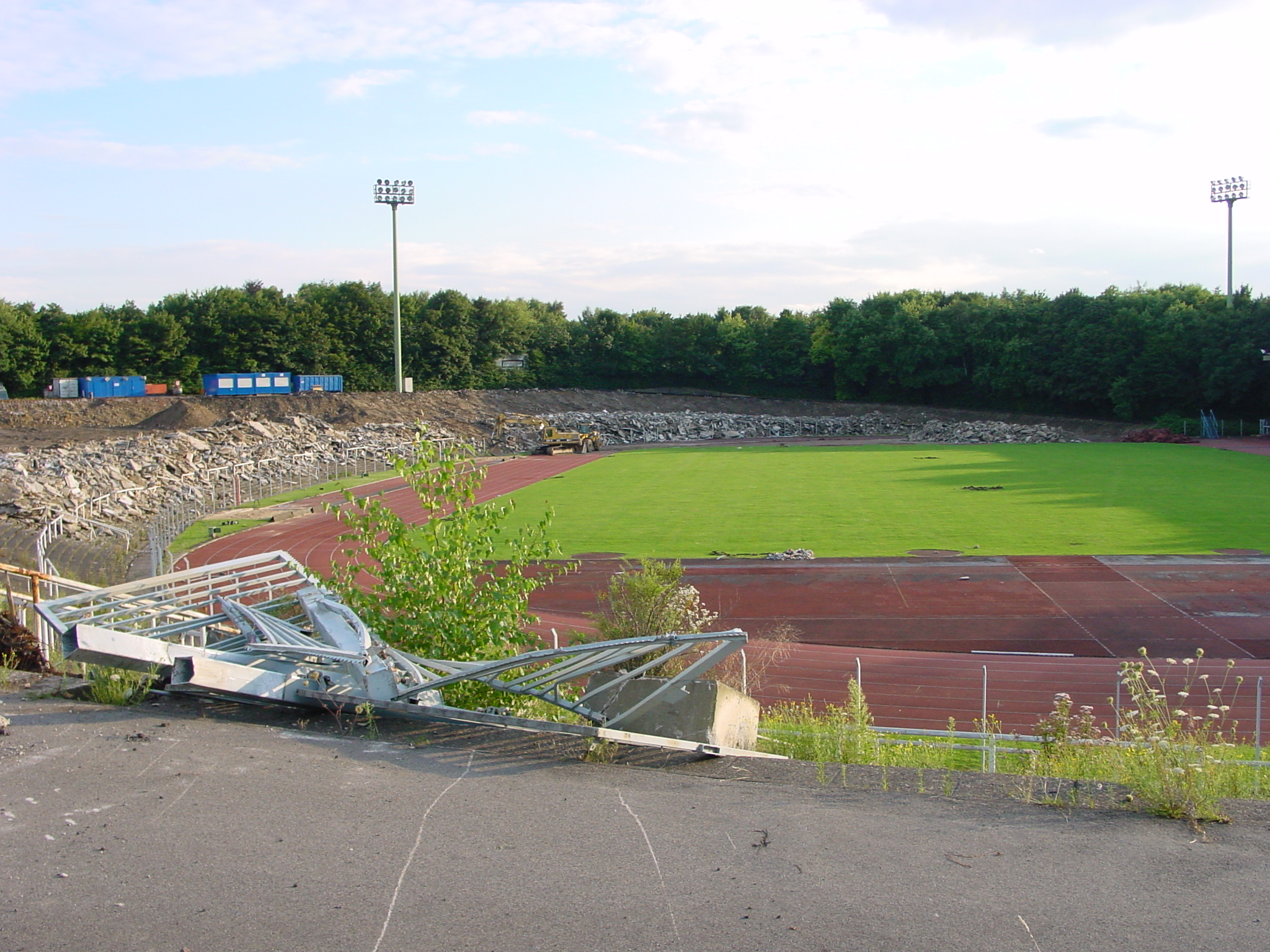
- Interactive map of Grugastadion
- Location: Essen, Germany
- Owner: Stadt Essen
- Capacity: 40,000
- Surface: Grass

Construction
- Opened: 13. September 1963
- Closed: 2001

Grugastadion was a multi-use stadium in Essen, Germany. It was used mostly for football matches, and the stadium was able to hold 40,000 people at its height. The stadium opened in 1963 and closed in 2001.
