= Great Strahov Stadium =

Stadium in Prague, Czech Republic

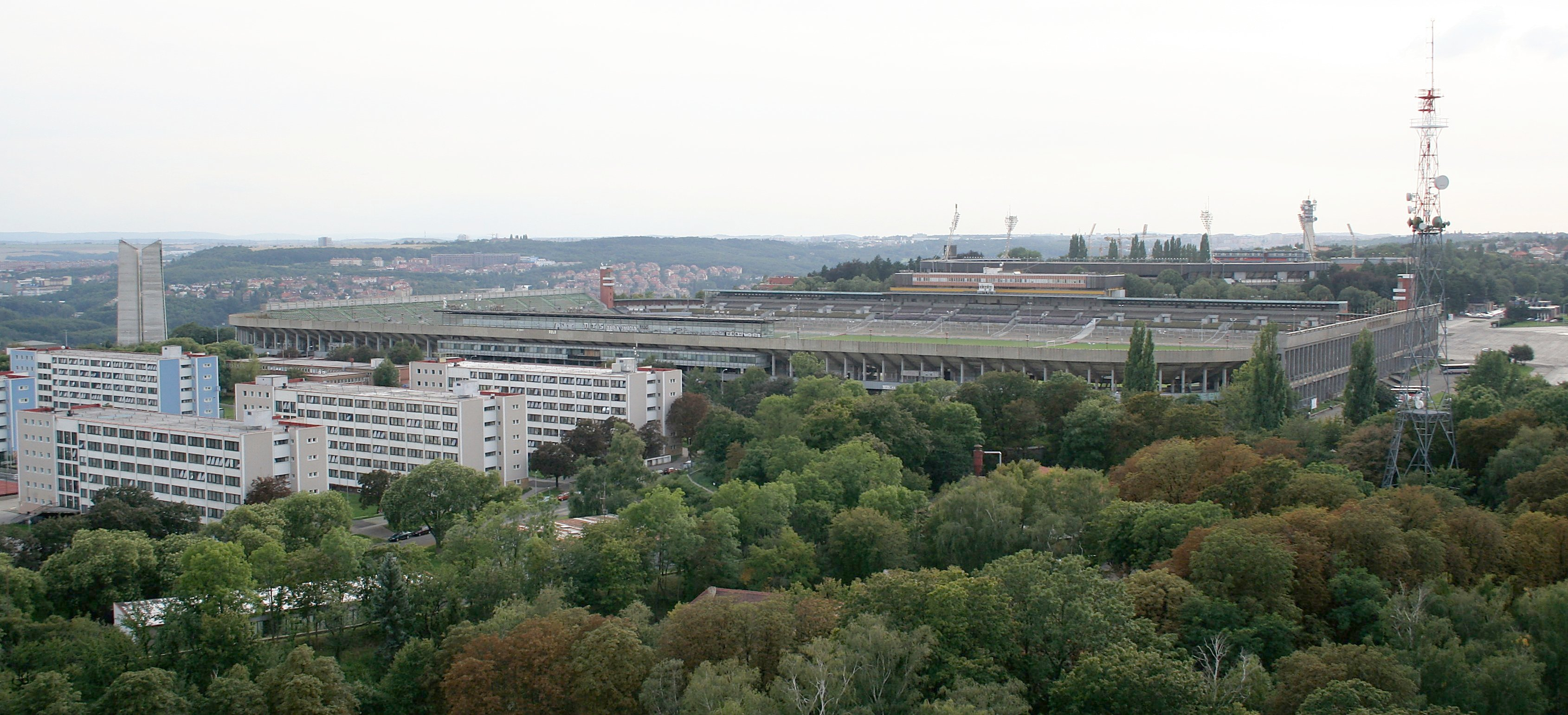
- Great Strahov Stadium as seen from Petřín lookout tower
- Interactive map of Great Strahov Stadium
- Location: Strahov, Prague, Czech Republic
- Coordinates: 50°4′49.21″N 14°23′16.30″E
- Owner: City of Prague
- Capacity: 56,000 (250,000 Historically)
- Surface: grass
- Field size: 9 football pitches (total 310.5 × 202.5 m)

Construction
- Opened: July 4, 1926; 100 years ago

Tenants
- AC Sparta Prague (training only); AC Sparta Prague B (2026–)

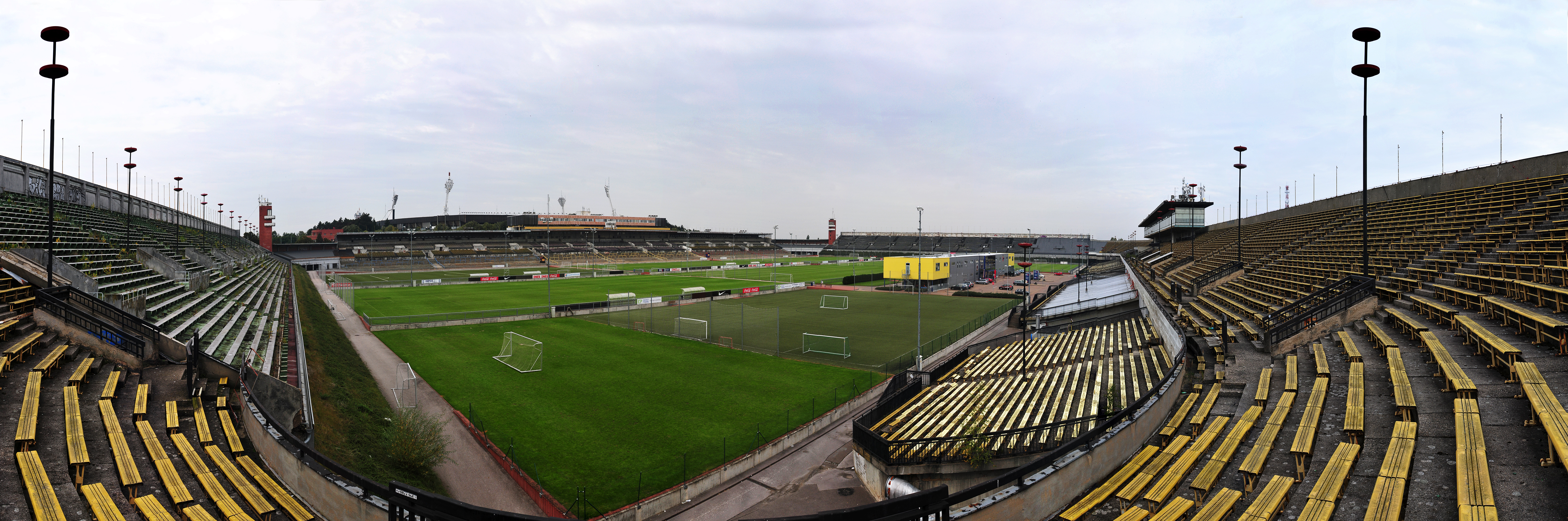
Great Strahov Stadium from southeast

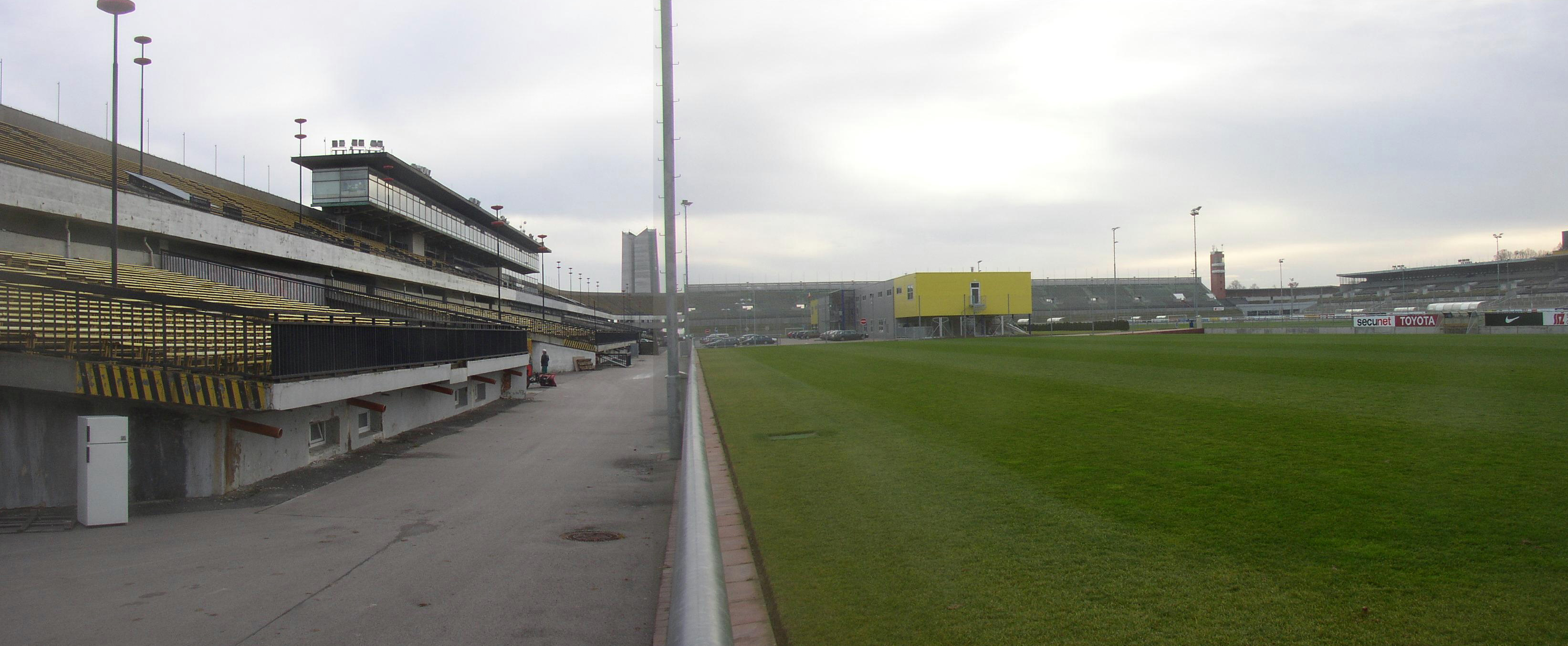
Interior of the stadium from northeast corner (2006)

The Great Strahov Stadium (Czech: Velký strahovský stadion) is a former stadium in the Strahov district of Prague, Czech Republic. It was built for displays of synchronized gymnastics on a massive scale, with a field three times as long and three times as wide as the standard association football pitch. It had a capacity of around 250,000, making it larger than any current or former sports stadium, and the second largest sports venue ever built.

As of 2019 the stadium is no longer in use for competitive sports events. It is a training centre for Sparta Prague and previously hosted pop and rock concerts. The stadium is located on Petřín Hill, overlooking the old city. It can be accessed by taking the Petřín funicular up the hill through the gardens, or by taking tram lines 22, 23, or 25 to Malovanka station.

== Construction ==
Construction began based on plans by the architect Alois Dryák, on a wooden stadium in 1926, which was replaced by concrete grandstands in 1932. Further construction occurred in 1948 and 1975. The playing field, surrounded by seating on all sides, is 63,500 square metres.

The stadium currently serves Sparta Prague as a training centre with 8 football pitches (6 pitches of standard sizes and 2 futsal pitches).

== History ==
The original stadium dates from the First Republic between the World Wars and served as a venue for popular Sokol displays of massive synchronized gymnastics. Construction of the first stadium began in 1926 on the current ground plan for the 8th Všesokolský slet. On 14 May 1933 the stadium hosted motorcycle speedway for the first time.

The stadium was modernized in 1932 for the 9th Všesokolský slet. Both of these displays were attended by Czechoslovak President T. G. Masaryk, who had been a member of Sokol since he was thirteen, on his horse Hektor. The largest attendance was recorded in 1938 on the occasion of the jubilee "World anti-war" 10th Všesokolský slet.

During the Nazi occupation the stadium was used for a military parade in honor of Hitler's 50th birthday. Later it became an assembly spot for Jews, before they were sent to concentration camps. After World War II, it was used as a temporary detention center for German-speaking Czechs awaiting expulsion.

A few months after the end of World War II in Europe, two units of the United States Army played an exhibition game of American football. On September 28, 1945, a crowd of 40,000 watched soldier-athletes of the 94th Infantry Division defeat a team from the XXII Corps, by a score of 6–0. The first motor sport event after the end of the World War II was held at the stadium on 2 September 1945.

11th Všesokolský slet in 1948 was used as a protest against rising communism. Soon after, the Sokol was dissolved and followed Spartakiades. The Sokol displays were renamed Spartakiads during the communist era. The Spartakiads also took place in the Soviet Union, East Germany, and Albania.

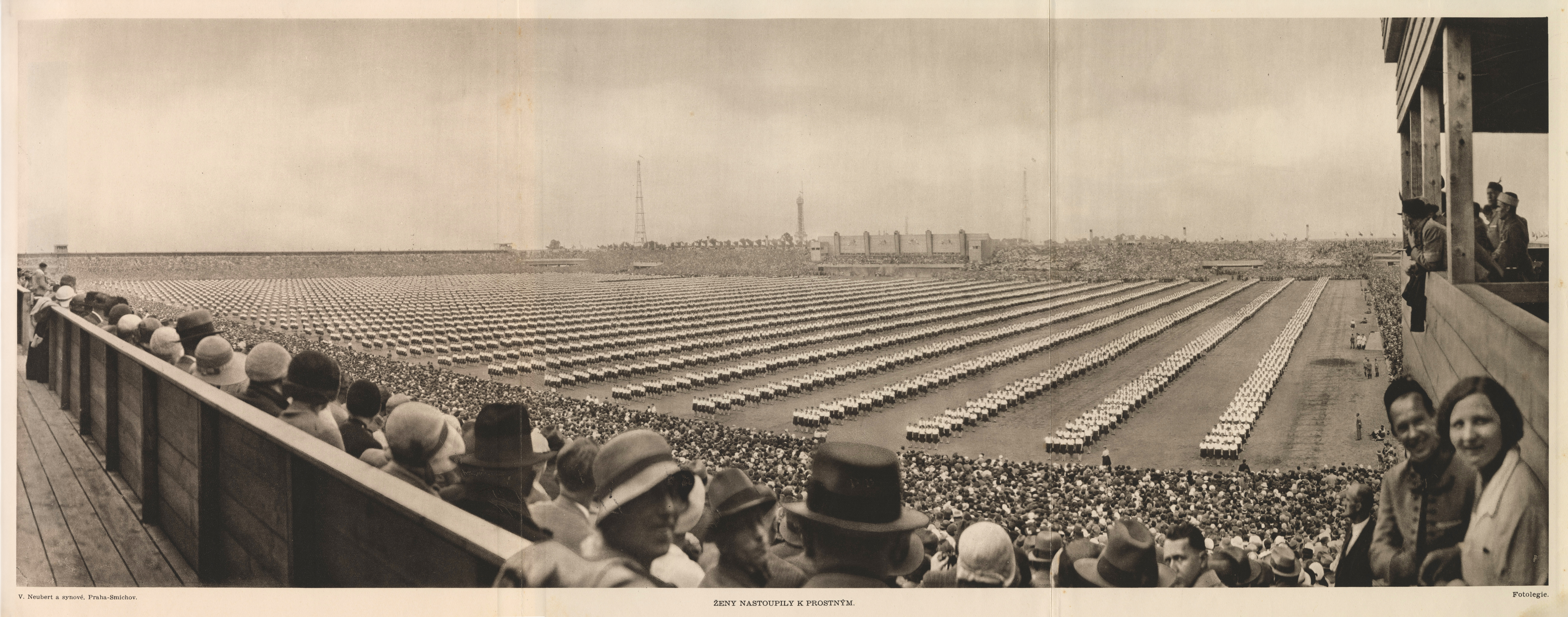
The Great Strahov Stadium in Prague was filled to capacity while women participants took to the field during the IXth (1932) Prague Sokol Slet. The original caption in Czech translates to Women have joined the ranks.

The first World Championship speedway event held in Czechoslovakia was at the stadium when it hosted a continental qualifying round during the 1963 Individual Speedway World Championship on 9 May 1963. The last speedway meeting was held on 2 September 1973.

Performances with several thousand gymnasts making various complex formations, with some performers performing in synchronization while traditional folk music played overhead, attracted the attention of many visitors. Some of the most popular shows were those of young well-trained recruits who wore only boxer shorts while on the display or women dancing in miniskirts. The groups of volunteer gymnasts (unlike the soldiers, who were ordered to practice and participate) were put together from top-level local athletic association members who regularly trained for the show throughout the year prior to the event. The event was held semi-decadally until 1985.

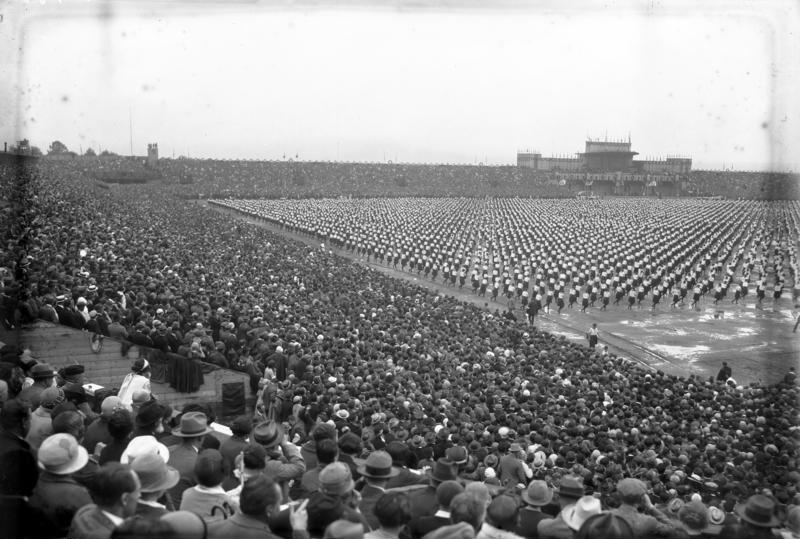
Všesokolský slet in 1932, organized by Sokol

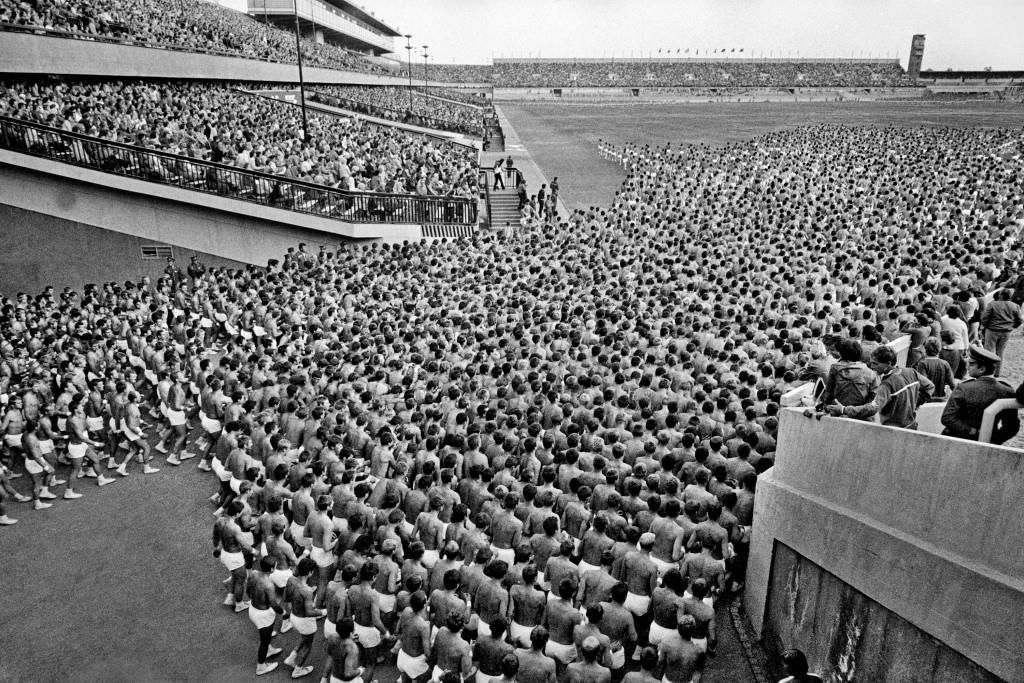
1980 Spartakiad on Great Strahov Stadium

The last Spartakiad was held here in 1985. Renewed 12th Všesokolský slet took place here with the presence of Czech President Václav Havel in 1994. However, the next Sokol venues took place in the smaller stadiums (Stadion Evžena Rošického and Eden Arena). In 1990, Great Strahov Stadium hosted British classic rock group, The Rolling Stones. The concert had 100,000 spectators, most notably, former President Václav Havel. In 1995 Pope John Paul II used the stadium for a massive public mass. Since the 90s, the spacious building hosted few events. Weeds and other vegetation grew on the playing surfaces, due to a lack of care. The area was also used for exhibitions and trade fairs and was also used for exhibition polo games.

At the beginning of the 21st century, there were talks about demolishing the venue. However, those talks have since diminished. In 2003, part of the stadium, with the financial support of the City of Prague, was reconstructed by AC Sparta Prague with eight football fields. It is now used as a training centre for Sparta. In 2014, the complex management of the stadium was resolved, and the complex is now owned by the city of Prague.

The 2019 Apple iPhone XR "Color Flood" commercial, which featured large numbers of people running in different colored jumpsuits, was filmed at the stadium.

== Concerts ==
Since 1990, the stadium has been used for rock concerts.

- The Rolling Stones – Aug 18, 1990 & Aug 5, 1995 (attendance 100,000 & 127,000 respectively)
- Guns N' Roses – May 20, 1992 (attendance 60,000), with Soundgarden and Faith No More
- Bon Jovi – Sept 4, 1993 (attendance 30,000) with Billy Idol and Little Angels
- Aerosmith – May 27, 1994 (attendance 50,000) with Extreme
- Pink Floyd – Sept 7, 1994 (official attendance 110,000, but eventually another estimated 10,000 people snuck in or pushed into the venue)
- Bratři Nedvědové – June 21, 1996 (attendance 60,000)
- U2 – Aug 14, 1997 (attendance approx. 62,000)
- AC/DC – June 12, 2001 (attendance 25,000), with Rammstein
- Ozzfest – May 30, 2002 (attendance 30,000), with Ozzy Osbourne, Tool and Slayer

== Future of the stadium ==
In the last decade several studies have looked at adaptive reuse and preservation of this unique structure. There are plans to convert the extremely large Great Strahov stadium complex into a commercial zone complete with hotels, restaurants, and shops. Another proposition was to convert the area into a "leisure mecca for the 21st century". There were plans to rebuild the area as an Olympic village if Prague won a future Olympic bid. However, the bid for 2016 was unsuccessful.

== See also ==
- Sport in the Czech Republic
- Stadion Evžena Rošického
