= Cleveland Baseball Federation =

The Cleveland Baseball Federation (CBF) is a non-profit charity that helps to fund sandlot baseball programs for inner city youth in Cleveland, Ohio. Founded in 1936, the CBF estimates that the program has served more than 60,000 inner city children.

The CBF works with Cleveland's Recreation Department by helping to administer the department's sandlot baseball program.

Charitable donations and corporate sponsorships allows CBF to fully fund programs for over 7,000 Cleveland youths, on 354 teams in 2005. The CBF also provides funding for 175 adult teams serving 3,818 adults in the greater Cleveland area. In addition to baseball programs the CBF also provides:

- Health insurance to each child enrolled in its programs
- Educational scholarships
- Training for coaches and umpires serving the teams and the leagues
- Personal development programs for participants to help break the cycle of poverty in Cleveland

Registration for the program begins in April of each year and concludes with Championship games in August.

The CBF also enjoys a close working relationship with the Cleveland Indians baseball club, and players frequently interact with CBF teams and help with appearances at fund raisers for the organization.
