= Spartakiad (Czechoslovakia) =

Mass gymnastics displays (1955–1990)

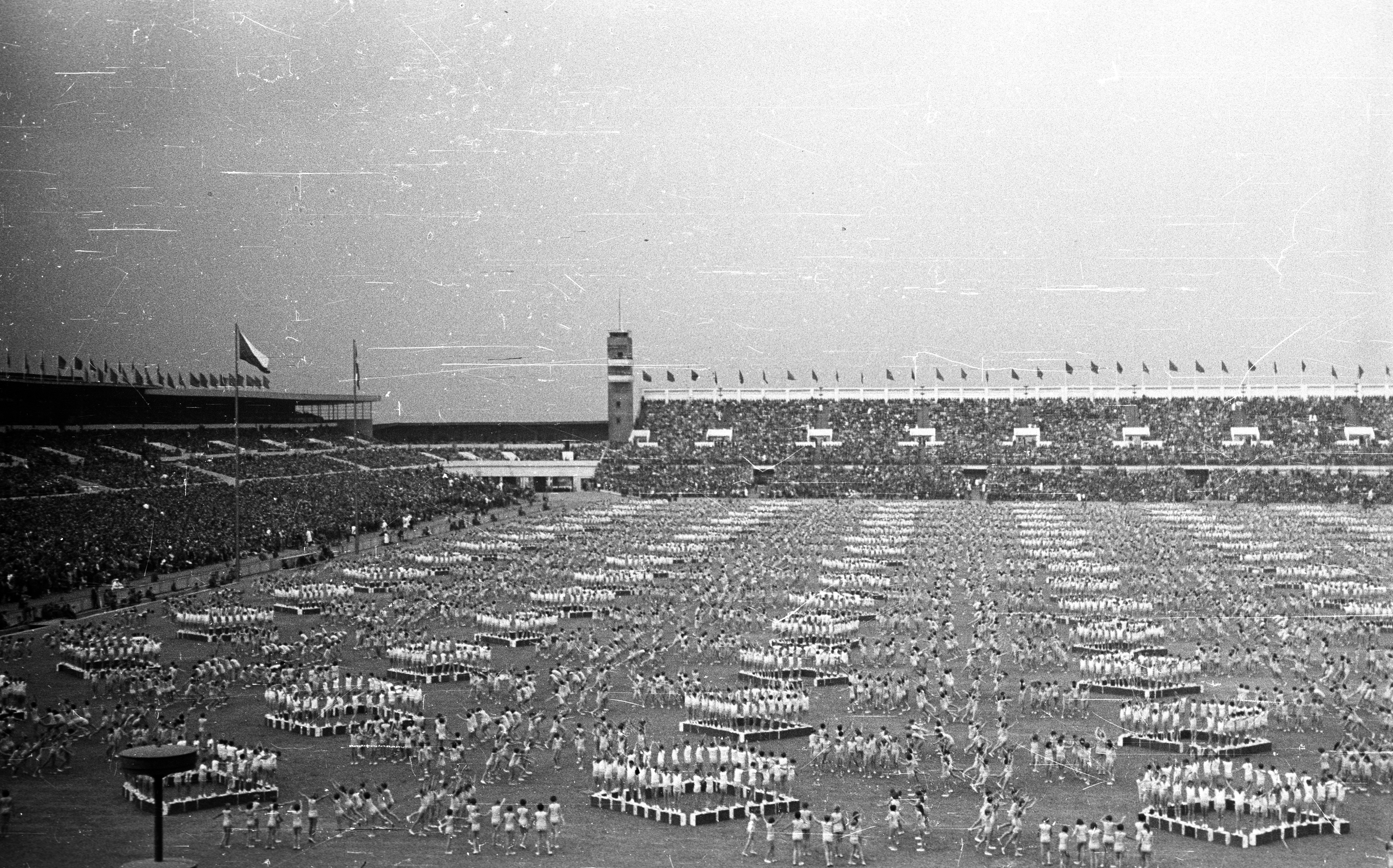
- 1965 Spartakiad
- Status: Inactive
- Genre: Sports event
- Location: Prague
- Country: Czechoslovak Socialist Republic
- Inaugurated: 1955
- Most recent: 1990
- Sponsor: Communist Party of Czechoslovakia

The Spartakiads or Spartakiades in Czechoslovakia (Czech and Slovak: Spartakiáda) were mass gymnastics events, designed to celebrate the Red Army's liberation of Czechoslovakia in 1945. The name refers to the 1921 Prague Spartakiad organised by the Communist Party of Czechoslovakia. They were organised by the Communist government as a replacement of the similar Sokol gatherings, which were disapproved by the regime and discontinued after World War II. The Spartakiads took place at the Strahov Stadium, the largest stadium ever built and the venue of the last pre-war Sokol gathering. Most of the organisers of the Spartakiads were former Sokol officials.

== History ==
The first Spartakiad took place in 1955, and was subsequently held every five years. The Spartakiad scheduled for 1970 was canceled in the wake of the Prague Spring and the beginning of normalization. Preparations for the 1990 Spartakiad were interrupted by the Velvet Revolution, but the event still took place as the "Prague Sports Games", albeit on a much smaller scale than the previous ones.

The Spartakiads involved large numbers of people; for example, at the 1960 Spartakiad about 750,000 gymnasts from the whole country took part and over 2,000,000 spectators witnessed the event. The last major edition in 1985 saw around 160,000 people perform across fifteen demonstrations.

Before each Spartakiad, local Spartakiads were held, with juries selecting the best gymnasts from each region for the national event. Men and women of all ages practiced and performed exercise routines. Appearance was originally mandatory for students and servicemen of the armed forces and police. During the Normalization years, it became more voluntary.

The 1985 Spartakiad originated the Michal David pop song Poupata (Flower Buds), which became a major national hit and remains popular today.

== Gallery ==
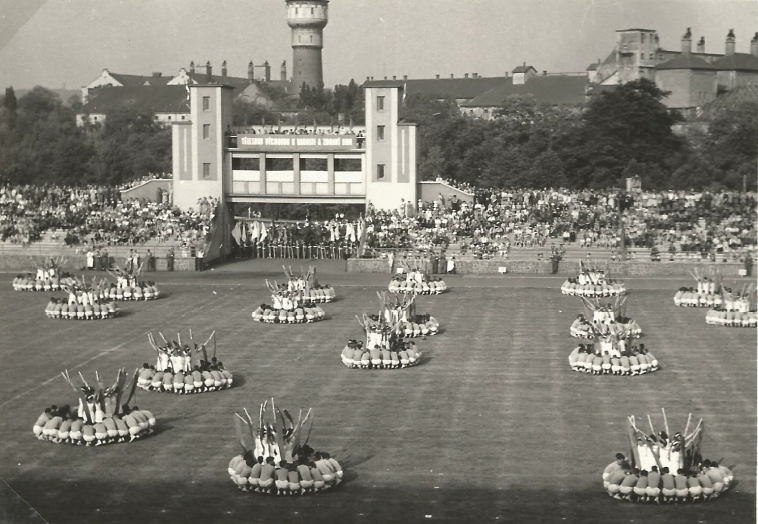
1960 Spartakiad view from the stands.

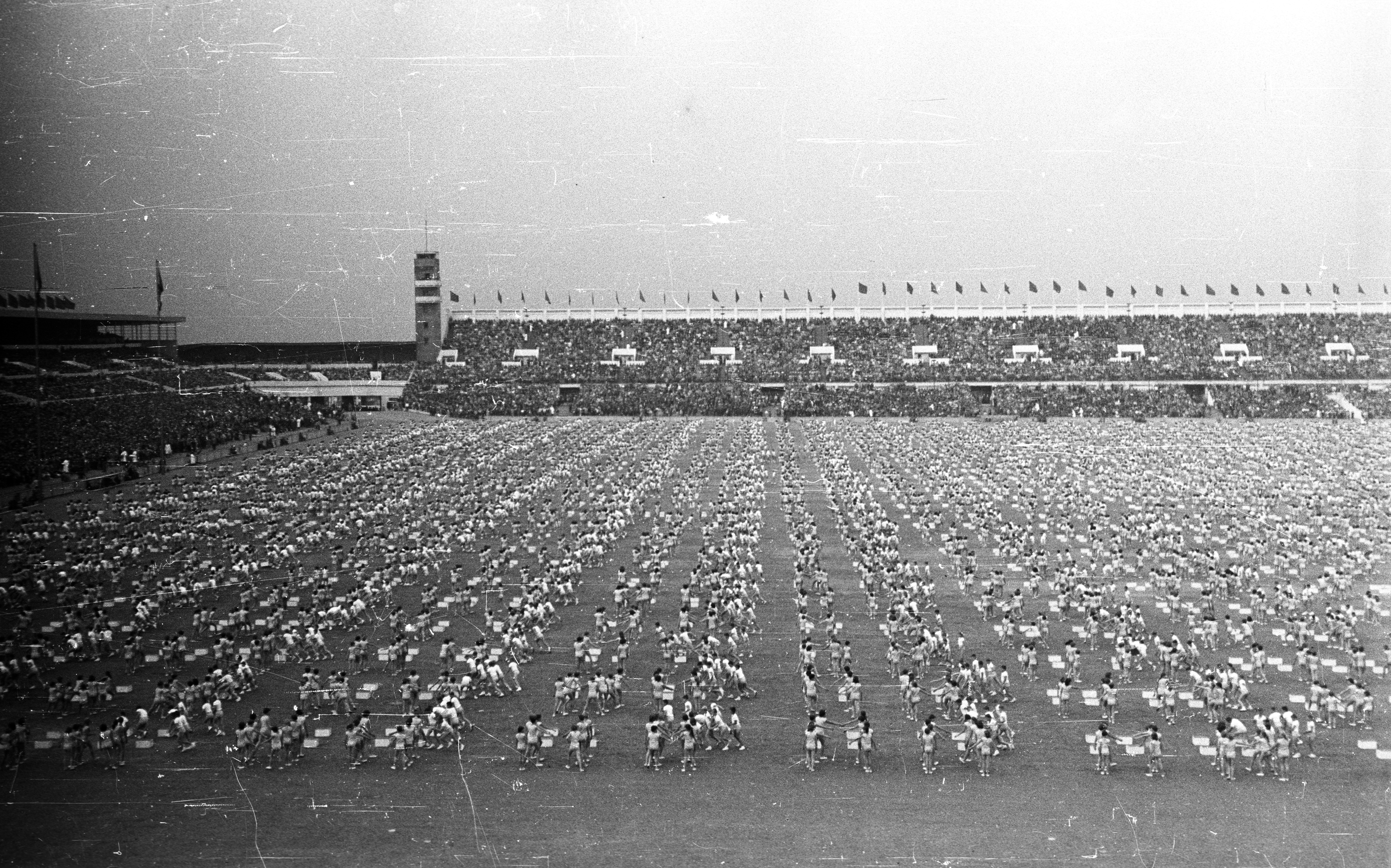
1965 Spartakiad performance.

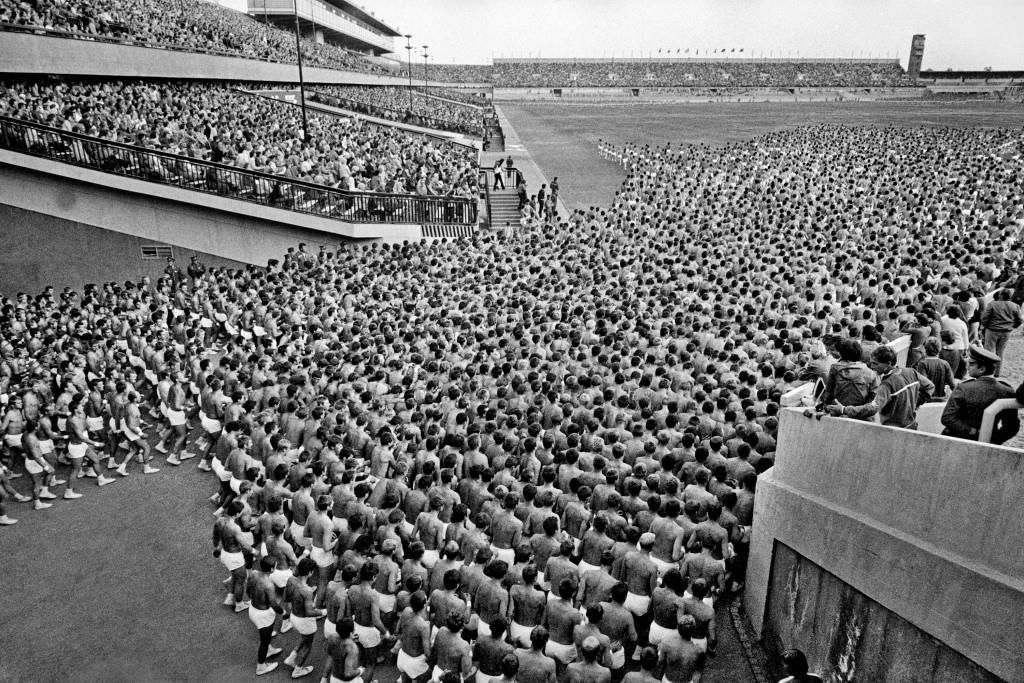
Members of the Czechoslovak People's Army about to perform in the 1980 Spartakiad.

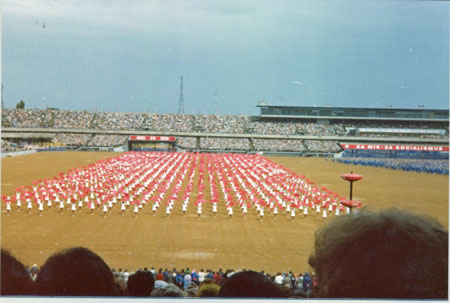
1980 Spartakiad view from the stands. The banner on the right reads "For peace, for socialism".

== See also ==
- Mass games
- Spartakiad
- World Gymnaestrada
