= List of stadiums by capacity =

The following is a list of notable sports stadiums, ordered by their capacity, which refers to the maximum number of spectators they can normally accommodate. The following numbers are based on the ISBC (International Stadium Building Convention). These are confirmed but do not take into consideration extra seating space added temporarily.

== List criteria notes ==
- The capacity figures are standard, permanent total capacity, including both seating and any permanent standing areas, but excluding any temporary accommodation.
- Incidental record attendance is not considered relevant. Only regular capacity counts; for attendance records, see List of sporting venues with a highest attendance of 100,000 or more.
- Only stadiums with a capacity of 40,000 or more are included in this list.
- Stadiums that are defunct or closed, or those that no longer serve as competitive sports venues (such as Great Strahov Stadium, which was the largest in the world and held around 250,000 spectators), are not included. They are listed under List of closed stadiums by capacity.
- An asterisk (*) indicates that the team plays only some (few) of its home matches at the venue, and may have another (primary) home ground.
- For purposes of this list, race tracks (such as the Indianapolis Motor Speedway and the Tokyo Racecourse) are not stadiums, and are not included here. For a list of all sports venues by capacity, see List of sports venues by capacity.
- Capacities are taken whenever possible from the figure stated on the official website of a stadium, its tenants, or sports event it has hosted.

== List ==
=== Capacity of 100,000 or more ===
Stadium	Capacity	City (state)	Country	Region	Tenants	Sport(s)	Image
Narendra Modi Stadium	132,000	Ahmedabad, Gujarat	India	South Asia	List: India men's national team (2020–present) India women's national team (2020–present) Gujarat men's team (2020–present) Gujarat women's team (2020–present) Gujarat Titans (2022–present) Gujarat Giants (2023-present)	Cricket	
Rungrado 1st of May Stadium	113,281	Pyongyang	North Korea	East Asia	North Korea national football team	Association football, athletics, mass games, Marathon	
Michigan Stadium	107,601	Ann Arbor, Michigan	United States	North America	Michigan Wolverines football	American football	
Beaver Stadium	106,572	College Township, Pennsylvania (postal address University Park)	United States	North America	Penn State Nittany Lions football	American football	
Ohio Stadium	102,780	Columbus, Ohio	United States	North America	Ohio State Buckeyes football	American football	
Kyle Field	102,733	College Station, Texas	United States	North America	Texas A&M Aggies football	American football	
Tiger Stadium	102,321	Baton Rouge, Louisiana	United States	North America	LSU Tigers football	American football	
Neyland Stadium	101,915	Knoxville, Tennessee	United States	North America	Tennessee Volunteers football	American football	
Darrell K Royal–Texas Memorial Stadium	100,119	Austin, Texas	United States	North America	Texas Longhorns football	American football	
Bryant–Denny Stadium	100,077	Tuscaloosa, Alabama	United States	North America	Alabama Crimson Tide football	American football	
Melbourne Cricket Ground	100,024	Melbourne, Victoria	Australia	Oceania	List: Australia national cricket team, Victoria cricket team, Melbourne Cricket Club, Melbourne Stars, Melbourne Football Club, Carlton Football Club, Richmond Football Club, Collingwood Football Club, Hawthorn Football Club, Essendon Football Club	Cricket, Australian rules football	

=== Capacity of 90,000–99,999 ===
Stadium	Capacity	City (state)	Country	Region	Tenants	Sport(s)	Image
Camp Nou	99,354	Barcelona	Spain	Europe	FC Barcelona	Association football	
FNB Stadium	97,736	Johannesburg	South Africa	Africa	South Africa national soccer team, Kaizer Chiefs F.C., South Africa national rugby union team	Association football, Rugby union	
Misr Stadium	93,940	The New Capital	Egypt	Africa	Egypt national football team	Association football	
Sanford Stadium	93,033	Athens, Georgia	United States	North America	Georgia Bulldogs football	American football	
Cotton Bowl	92,100	Dallas, Texas	United States	North America	Dallas Trinity FC, Red River Rivalry	American football, association football	
Wembley Stadium	90,000	Wembley, Greater London	United Kingdom	Europe	England national football team	Association football, rugby league, American football	

=== Capacity of 80,000–89,999 ===
Stadium	Capacity	City (state)	Country	Region	Tenants	Sport(s)	Image
Rose Bowl	89,702	Pasadena, California	United States	North America	UCLA Bruins football, Rose Bowl Game	American football, Association football	
Lusail Stadium	88,966	Lusail	Qatar	Western Asia	Qatar national football team	Association football	
Ben Hill Griffin Stadium	88,548	Gainesville, Florida	United States	North America	Florida Gators football	American football	
Jordan–Hare Stadium	88,043	Auburn, Alabama	United States	North America	Auburn Tigers football	American football	
Estadio Azteca	87,523	Mexico City	Mexico	North America	Club América, Cruz Azul, Mexico national football team	Association football	
Bukit Jalil National Stadium	87,500	Kuala Lumpur	Malaysia	Southeast Asia	Malaysia national football team	Association football, Athletics	
Borg El Arab Stadium	86,000	Alexandria	Egypt	Africa	Egypt national football team	Association football	
Memorial Stadium	85,458	Lincoln, Nebraska	United States	North America	Nebraska Cornhuskers football	American football	
Estadio Monumental	85,018	Buenos Aires	Argentina	South America	Argentina national football team, River Plate	Association football	
Salt Lake Stadium	85,000	Kolkata	India	South Asia	India national football team, Mohun Bagan Super Giant, East Bengal FC, Mohammedan SC	Association football, Athletics	
Bernabéu	83,186	Madrid	Spain	Europe	Real Madrid C.F.	Association football	
MetLife Stadium	82,500	East Rutherford, New Jersey	United States	North America	New York Giants, New York Jets	American football	
Stadium Australia	82,500	Sydney	Australia	Oceania	Wallabies, New South Wales Waratahs, New South Wales Blues, Canterbury-Bankstown Bulldogs, South Sydney Rabbitohs, GWS Giants, Australia men's national soccer team, Australia women's national soccer team, Sydney FC	Rugby union, Rugby league, Australian rules football, Soccer	
Croke Park	82,300	Dublin	Ireland	Europe	Gaelic Athletic Association	Gaelic football, hurling, camogie	
Jakarta International Stadium	82,000	Jakarta	Indonesia	Southeast Asia	Persija Jakarta, Indonesia national football team	Association football	
Twickenham Stadium	82,000	Twickenham, Greater London	United Kingdom	Europe	England national rugby union team	Rugby union	
Memorial Stadium	81,500	Clemson, South Carolina	United States	North America	Clemson Tigers football	American football	
Lambeau Field	81,441	Green Bay, Wisconsin	United States	North America	Green Bay Packers	American football	
Signal Iduna Park	81,365	Dortmund	Germany	Europe	Borussia Dortmund	Association football	
Stade de France	81,338	Saint-Denis	France	Europe	France national football team, France national rugby union team*, Stade Français*, Racing 92*	Association football, rugby union	
Luzhniki Stadium	81,000	Moscow	Russia	Europe	Russia national football team, FC Torpedo Moscow	Association football	
Gaylord Family Oklahoma Memorial Stadium	80,126	Norman, Oklahoma	United States	North America	Oklahoma Sooners football	American football	
Estadio Monumental	80,093	Lima	Peru	South America	Universitario de Deportes	Association football	
San Siro	80,018	Milan	Italy	Europe	AC Milan, Inter Milan, Italy national football team	Association football	
Guangdong Olympic Stadium	80,012	Guangzhou, Guangdong	China	East Asia		Association football, Athletics	
AT&T Stadium	80,000	Arlington, Texas	United States	North America	Dallas Cowboys, Cotton Bowl	American football	
Beijing National Stadium	80,000	Beijing	China	East Asia	China national football team, China women's national football team	Association football, Athletics	
Hangzhou Olympic Expo Center Stadium	80,000	Hangzhou	China	East Asia		Association football, Athletics	
Stade des Martyrs	80,000	Kinshasa	Democratic Republic of the Congo	Africa	DR Congo national football team	Association football	

=== Capacity of 70,000–79,999 ===
Stadium	Capacity	City (state)	Country	Region	Tenants	Sport(s)
Azadi Stadium	78,116	Tehran	Iran	Western Asia	Iran national football team, Persepolis, Esteghlal	Association football
Notre Dame Stadium	77,622	Notre Dame, Indiana	United States	North America	Notre Dame Fighting Irish football	American football
Atatürk Olympic Stadium	77,563	Istanbul	Turkey	Europe	Turkey national football team, Fatih Karagümrük	Association football, athletics
Williams-Brice Stadium	77,559	Columbia, South Carolina	United States	North America	South Carolina Gamecocks football	American football
Los Angeles Memorial Coliseum	77,500	Los Angeles	United States	North America	USC Trojans football	American football
Gelora Bung Karno Stadium	77,193	Jakarta	Indonesia	Southeast Asia	Indonesia national football team	Association football, athletics
Arrowhead Stadium	76,640	Kansas City, Missouri	United States	North America	Kansas City Chiefs	American football
Donald W. Reynolds Razorback Stadium	76,212	Fayetteville, Arkansas	United States	North America	Arkansas Razorbacks football	American football
Empower Field at Mile High	76,125	Denver	United States	North America	Denver Broncos	American football
Camp Randall Stadium	76,057	Madison, Wisconsin	United States	North America	Wisconsin Badgers football	American football
Allianz Arena	75,024	Munich	Germany	Europe	Bayern Munich	Association football
Tangier Grand Stadium	75,000	Tangier	Morocco	Africa	IR Tanger, Morocco national football team	Association football
Naghsh-e Jahan Stadium	75,000	Isfahan	Iran	Western Asia	Sepahan S.C.	Association football
Cairo International Stadium	75,000	Cairo	Egypt	Africa	Egypt national football team, Al Ahly, Zamalek	Association football
Bank of America Stadium	74,867	Charlotte, North Carolina	United States	North America	Carolina Panthers	American football
Spartan Stadium	74,866	East Lansing, Michigan	United States	North America	Michigan State Spartans football	American football
Olympiastadion	74,475	Berlin	Germany	Europe	Hertha BSC	Association football, athletics
Old Trafford	74,244	Trafford, Greater Manchester	United Kingdom	Europe	Manchester United F.C.	Association football, rugby league
Millennium Stadium	73,931	Cardiff	United Kingdom	Europe	Wales national rugby union team	Rugby union, association football
Caesars Superdome	73,208	New Orleans	United States	North America	New Orleans Saints	American football, association football, baseball
Maracanã Stadium	73,139	Rio de Janeiro	Brazil	South America	Flamengo, Fluminense, Brazil national football team	Association football
Mercedes-Benz Stadium	73,019	Atlanta	United States	North America	Atlanta Falcons, Atlanta United FC	American football, association football
Nissan Stadium	72,327	Yokohama	Japan	East Asia	Yokohama F. Marinos	Association football
Reliant Stadium	72,220	Houston	United States	North America	Houston Texans	American football
Athens Olympic Stadium	72,080	Athens	Greece	Europe		Association football, athletics
Shanghai Stadium	72,000	Shanghai	China	East Asia	Shanghai Shenhua	Association football
Legion Field	71,594	Birmingham, Alabama	United States	North America	UAB Blazers football	American football
Estadio de La Cartuja	71,374	Seville	Spain	Europe	Spain national football team*	Association football
Metropolitano Stadium	70,813	Madrid	Spain	Europe	Atlético Madrid	Association football
M&T Bank Stadium	70,745	Baltimore	United States	North America	Baltimore Ravens	American football
Al Bayt Stadium	70,736	Al Khor	Qatar	Western Asia	Qatar national football team, Al-Khor SC	Association football
Stadio Olimpico	70,634	Rome	Italy	Europe	Italy national rugby union team, AS Roma, SS Lazio	Rugby union, Association football
SoFi Stadium	70,240	Inglewood	United States	North America	Los Angeles Rams, Los Angeles Chargers, hosts LA Bowl	American football
Kyiv Olympic Stadium	70,050	Kyiv	Ukraine	Europe	Dynamo Kyiv	Association football, Athletics
Husky Stadium	70,038	Seattle	United States	North America	Washington Huskies football	American football

=== Capacity of 60,000–69,999 ===
Stadium	Capacity	City (state)	Country	Region	Tenants	Sport(s)
Estádio Nacional Mané Garrincha	69,910	Brasília	Brazil	South America	Sociedade Esportiva do Gama*	Association football
Prince Moulay Abdellah Stadium	69,500	Rabat	Morocco	Africa	Morocco national team, AS FAR	Association football
Lincoln Financial Field	69,328	Philadelphia	United States	North America	Philadelphia Eagles, Temple Owls football	American football
Kinnick Stadium	69,250	Iowa City, Iowa	United States	North America	Iowa Hawkeyes football	American football
Nissan Stadium	69,143	Nashville, Tennessee	United States	North America	Tennessee Titans, Tennessee State Tigers football	American football
Lumen Field	69,000	Seattle	United States	North America	Seattle Seahawks, Seattle Sounders FC, Seattle Reign FC	American football, association football
Seoul Olympic Stadium	68,900	Seoul	South Korea	East Asia	South Korea national football team	Athletics, association football
Baku Olympic Stadium	68,700	Baku	Azerbaijan	Western Asia	Azerbaijan national football team	Association football, athletics
Levi's Stadium	68,500	Santa Clara, California	United States	North America	San Francisco 49ers	American football
Acrisure Stadium	68,400	Pittsburgh	United States	North America	Pittsburgh Steelers, Pittsburgh Panthers football	American football
Krestovsky Stadium	68,134	Saint Petersburg	Russia	Europe	FC Zenit Saint Petersburg	Association football
Estádio da Luz	68,100	Lisbon	Portugal	Europe	Benfica	Association football
London Stadium	68,013	Stratford, Greater London	United Kingdom	Europe	West Ham United F.C., British Athletics	Athletics, Association football, Baseball, cricket, rugby union, rugby league
Eden Gardens	68,000	Kolkata	India	South Asia	Indian national cricket team, Bengal cricket team, Kolkata Knight Riders	Cricket
Workers' Stadium	68,000	Beijing	China	East Asia	Beijing Guoan, China national football team	Association football
EverBank Stadium	67,814	Jacksonville, Florida	United States	North America	Jacksonville Jaguars	American football
Japan National Stadium	67,750	Tokyo	Japan	East Asia	Japan national football team, Japan national rugby union team	Association football, Athletics, Rugby union
Hard Rock Stadium	67,518	Miami Gardens, Florida	United States	North America	Miami Dolphins, Miami Hurricanes football	American football, baseball
Huntington Bank Field	67,431	Cleveland	United States	North America	Cleveland Browns	American football
Stade Vélodrome	67,344	Marseille	France	Europe	Olympique de Marseille, RC Toulon*	Association football, rugby union
The Dome at America's Center	67,277	St. Louis	United States	North America	St. Louis BattleHawks	American football
Doak Campbell Stadium	67,277	Tallahassee, Florida	United States	North America	Florida State Seminoles football	American football
Puskás Aréna	67,215	Budapest	Hungary	Europe	Hungary national football team	Association football
Murrayfield Stadium	67,144	Edinburgh	United Kingdom	Europe	Scotland national rugby union team*	Rugby union
Morumbi Stadium	67,052	São Paulo	Brazil	South America	São Paulo FC	Association football
Yadegar-e Emam Stadium	66,833	Tabriz	Iran	Western Asia	Tractor Sazi	Association football
Seoul World Cup Stadium	66,806	Seoul	South Korea	East Asia	South Korea national football team, FC Seoul	Association football
Mineirão	66,658	Belo Horizonte	Brazil	South America	Cruzeiro Esporte Clube	Association football
U.S. Bank Stadium	66,655	Minneapolis	United States	North America	Minnesota Vikings	American football
Daegu Stadium	66,422	Daegu	South Korea	East Asia	Daegu FC	Athletics, association football
Lane Stadium	66,233	Blacksburg, Virginia	United States	North America	Virginia Tech Hokies football	American football
Raymond James Stadium	65,847	Tampa, Florida	United States	North America	Tampa Bay Buccaneers, South Florida Bulls football (through 2026), Tampa Bay Vipers	American football
Paycor Stadium	65,515	Cincinnati	United States	North America	Cincinnati Bengals	American football
Camping World Stadium	65,438	Orlando, Florida	United States	North America	Multiple college football bowl games	American football, association football
Shaheed Veer Narayan Singh International Cricket Stadium	65,000	Raipur	India	South Asia	India national cricket team, Chhattisgarh cricket team, Delhi Capitals*	Cricket
Allegiant Stadium	65,000	Paradise, Nevada (postal address Las Vegas)	United States	North America	Las Vegas Raiders, UNLV Rebels football, hosts Las Vegas Bowl	American football
Estadio Metropolitano Roberto Meléndez	65,000	Barranquilla	Colombia	South America	Colombia national football team, Atlético Junior	Association football
Mogadishu Stadium	65,000	Mogadishu	Somalia	Africa	Somalia national football team, Elman FC and other local teams	Association football
Basra International Stadium	65,000	Basra	Iraq	Western Asia	Iraq national football team	Association football
Kamuzu Stadium	65,000	Blantyre	Malawi	Africa	Malawi national football team	Association football
Alamodome	65,000	San Antonio	United States	North America	UTSA Roadrunners football San Antonio Brahmas	American football, baseball
Ford Field	65,000	Detroit	United States	North America	Detroit Lions	American football
Hammadi Agrebi Stadium	65,000	Radès	Tunisia	Africa	Tunisia national football team	Association football
Tripoli Stadium	65,000	Tripoli	Libya	Africa	Libya national football team, Al-Ahly, Al-Ittihad, Al Madina	Association football
King Abdullah Sports City	65,000	Jeddah	Saudi Arabia	Western Asia	Saudi Arabia national football team*	Association football
Gillette Stadium	64,628	Foxborough, Massachusetts	United States	North America	New England Patriots, New England Revolution, UMass Minutemen football*	American football, association football
Stade du 5 Juillet	64,200	Algiers	Algeria	Africa	MC Alger	Association football
Vaught–Hemingway Stadium	64,038	University, Mississippi	United States	North America	Ole Miss Rebels football	American football
Saitama Stadium 2002	63,700	Saitama	Japan	East Asia	Urawa Red Diamonds	Association football
Dalian Barracuda Bay Football Stadium	63,671	Dalian, Liaoning	China	East Asia	Dalian Professional F.C., China national football team*	Association football
LaVell Edwards Stadium	63,470	Provo, Utah	United States	North America	Brigham Young University Cougars football	American football
State Farm Stadium	63,400	Glendale, Arizona	United States	North America	Arizona Cardinals	American football
California Memorial Stadium	63,186	Berkeley, California	United States	North America	California Golden Bears football	American football
Estadio Olímpico Universitario	63,186	Mexico City	Mexico	North America	Club Universidad Nacional, Pumas CU	Association football, American football
Olympiastadion	63,118	Munich	Germany	Europe		Athletics
Oakland Coliseum	63,026	Oakland, California	United States	North America	Oakland Athletics, Oakland Roots SC, Oakland Soul SC	Association football, baseball
Kenan Memorial Stadium	62,980	Chapel Hill, North Carolina	United States	North America	North Carolina Tar Heels football	American football
Tottenham Hotspur Stadium	62,850	Tottenham, Greater London	United Kingdom	Europe	Tottenham Hotspur F.C.	Association football
Ellis Park Stadium	62,567	Johannesburg	South Africa	Africa	Golden Lions, Lions, Orlando Pirates F.C.	Rugby union, association football
Lucas Oil Stadium	62,421	Indianapolis	United States	North America	Indianapolis Colts, Indy Eleven, occasional NCAA men's basketball events	American football, association football, basketball
Veltins-Arena	62,271	Gelsenkirchen	Germany	Europe	FC Schalke 04	Association football
Commanders Field	62,000	Landover, Maryland	United States	North America	Washington Commanders	American football
Shanxi Sports Centre Stadium	62,000	Taiyuan, Shanxi	China	East Asia		Association football, athletics
Faurot Field	61,620	Columbia, Missouri	United States	North America	Missouri Tigers football	American football
Jack Trice Stadium	61,500	Ames, Iowa	United States	North America	Iowa State Cyclones football	American football
Scott Stadium	61,500	Albemarle County, Virginia (postal address Charlottesville)	United States	North America	Virginia Cavaliers football	American football
Soldier Field	61,500	Chicago	United States	North America	Chicago Bears, Chicago Fire FC	American football, soccer
Yale Bowl	61,446	New Haven, Connecticut	United States	North America	Yale Bulldogs football	American football
Ross-Ade Stadium	61,441	West Lafayette, Indiana	United States	North America	Purdue Boilermakers football	American football
Anfield	61,276	Liverpool	United Kingdom	Europe	Liverpool	Association football
Optus Stadium	61,266	Perth	Australia	Oceania	Fremantle Dockers, West Coast Eagles, Australia Wallabies, Perth Scorchers, Australia national cricket team, Western Australia cricket team*	Australian rules football, Rugby union, cricket
Dalian Sports Center Stadium	61,000	Dalian, Liaoning	China	East Asia		Association football, athletics
L&N Federal Credit Union Stadium	61,000	Louisville, Kentucky	United States	North America	Louisville Cardinals football	American football
Kroger Field	61,000	Lexington, Kentucky	United States	North America	Kentucky Wildcats football	American football
Benito Villamarín	60,721	Seville	Spain	Europe	Real Betis	Association football
Emirates Stadium	60,704	Holloway, Greater London	United Kingdom	Europe	Arsenal	Association football
Gies Memorial Stadium	60,670	Champaign, Illinois	United States	North America	Illinois Fighting Illini football	American football
MHPArena	60,649	Stuttgart	Germany	Europe	VfB Stuttgart	Association football
Xiamen Egret Stadium	60,592	Xiamen	China	East Asia		Athletics, Association football
Grêmio Arena	60,540	Porto Alegre	Brazil	South America	Grêmio FBPA	Association football
Mississippi Veterans Memorial Stadium	60,492	Jackson, Mississippi	United States	North America	Jackson State Tigers	American football
Galaxy Stadium	60,454	Lubbock, Texas	United States	North America	Texas Tech Red Raiders football	American football
Celtic Park	60,411	Glasgow	United Kingdom	Europe	Celtic F.C.	Association football
Shenzhen Universiade Sports Centre	60,334	Shenzhen	China	East Asia		Athletics
Davis Wade Stadium	60,311	Mississippi State, Mississippi	United States	North America	Mississippi State Bulldogs football	American football
Jawaharlal Nehru Stadium	60,254	Delhi	India	South Asia	India national football team*, Punjab FC	Association football, athletics
Centenario Stadium	60,235	Montevideo	Uruguay	South America	Uruguay national football team, Club Nacional de Football, Club Atlético Peñarol	Association football
Boone Pickens Stadium	60,218	Stillwater, Oklahoma	United States	North America	Oklahoma State Cowboys football	American football
Highmark Stadium	60,108	Orchard Park, New York	United States	North America	Buffalo Bills	American football
Stade Municipal de Kintélé	60,055	Brazzaville	Congo	Africa	Congo national football team	Association football
Estádio do Arruda	60,044	Recife	Brazil	South America	Santa Cruz Futebol Clube	Association football
Alassane Ouattara Stadium	60,012	Abidjan	Ivory Coast	Africa	Ivory Coast national football team	Association football, rugby, athletics
Bahir Dar Stadium	60,000	Bahir Dar	Ethiopia	Africa	Ethiopia national football team, Bahir Dar Kenema F.C.	Association football
Benjamin Mkapa Stadium	60,000	Dar es Salaam	Tanzania	Africa	Tanzania national football team, Simba SC, Young Africans	Association football
Guangxi Sports Center Stadium	60,000	Nanning, Guangxi	China	East Asia	local football teams	Association football, athletics
Hefei Olympic Sports Center Stadium	60,000	Hefei, Anhui	China	East Asia	local football teams	Association football, athletics
Jaber Al-Ahmad International Stadium	60,000	Kuwait City	Kuwait	Western Asia	Kuwait national football team	Association football
Milan Puskar Stadium	60,000	Morgantown, West Virginia	United States	North America	West Virginia Mountaineers football	American football
Morodok Techo National Stadium	60,000	Phnom Penh	Cambodia	South East Asia	Cambodia national football team	Association football
Moshood Abiola National Stadium	60,000	Abuja	Nigeria	Africa	Nigeria national football team	Association football
National Heroes Stadium	60,000	Lusaka	Zambia	Africa	Zambia national football team	Association football
Nanjing Olympic Sports Center	60,000	Nanjing, Jiangsu	China	East Asia		Association football, athletics
National Sports Stadium	60,000	Harare	Zimbabwe	Africa	Zimbabwe national football team	Association football, athletics
Odi Stadium	60,000	Mabopane	South Africa	Africa	Garankuwa United	Association football
Olembe Stadium	60,000	Yaoundé	Cameroon	Africa	Cameroon national football team	Association football
Shenyang Olympic Sports Center Stadium	60,000	Shenyang, Liaoning	China	East Asia		Association football, athletics
Stade Léopold Sédar Senghor	60,000	Dakar	Senegal	Africa	Senegal national football team, ASC Jeanne d'Arc	Association football
Tigray Stadium	60,000	Mekelle	Ethiopia	Africa	Mekelle City, Shire Endaselassie F.C., Dedebit F.C.	Association football
Stade Tata Raphaël	60,000	Kinshasa	Democratic Republic of the Congo	Africa	Daring Club Motema Pembe, AS Vita Club	Association football
Tianhe Stadium	60,000	Guangzhou, Guangdong	China	East Asia		Association football

=== Capacity of 50,000–59,999 ===
Stadium	Capacity	City (state)	Country	Region	Tenants	Sport(s)
Haixia Olympic Center Stadium	59,562	Fuzhou	China	East Asia		Athletics
Simmons Bank Liberty Stadium	59,308	Memphis, Tennessee	United States	North America	Memphis Tigers football	American football
Estadio Monumental Isidro Romero Carbo	59,283	Guayaquil	Ecuador	South America	Barcelona Sporting Club	Association football
Parc Olympique Lyonnais	59,186	Décines-Charpieu	France	Europe	Olympique Lyonnais	Association football
Chongqing Olympic Sports Center	58,680	Chongqing	China	East Asia		Association football
PGE Stadion Narodowy	58,580	Warsaw	Poland	Europe	Poland national football team	Association football
King Fahd International Stadium	58,398	Riyadh	Saudi Arabia	Western Asia	Al Nassr, Al-Hilal	Association football
Stadio San Nicola	58,248	Bari	Italy	Europe	A.S. Bari	Association football
Waldstadion	58,000	Frankfurt	Germany	Europe	Eintracht Frankfurt	Association football
Castelão	57,876	Fortaleza	Brazil	South America	Ceará, Fortaleza	Association football
Arizona Stadium	57,803	Tucson, Arizona	United States	North America	Arizona Wildcats football	American football
Carter–Finley Stadium	57,583	Raleigh, North Carolina	United States	North America	NC State Wolfpack football	American football
Cape Town Stadium	57,367	Cape Town	South Africa	Africa	Cape Town City F.C. (2016), Western Province (rugby union), Stormers	Association football, rugby union
La Bombonera	57,200	Buenos Aires	Argentina	South America	Boca Juniors	Association football
Volksparkstadion	57,030	Hamburg	Germany	Europe	Hamburger SV	Association football
Estadio Mario Alberto Kempes	57,000	Córdoba	Argentina	South America		Association football
Jinan Olympic Sports Center Stadium	56,808	Jinan, Shandong	China	East Asia	Shandong Taishan	Association football, athletics
Estadio Jalisco	56,713	Guadalajara	Mexico	North America	Club Atlas, Leones Negros UdeG	Association football
Commonwealth Stadium	56,302	Edmonton	Canada	North America	Edmonton Elks	Canadian football, association football, rugby union, athletics
Olympic Stadium	56,040	Montreal	Canada	North America	Montreal Alouettes*, CF Montréal*	Canadian football, baseball, association football
Dodger Stadium	56,000	Los Angeles	United States	North America	Los Angeles Dodgers	Baseball
19 May 1956 Stadium	56,000	Annaba	Algeria	Africa	USM Annaba	Association football
Johan Cruyff Arena	55,445	Amsterdam	Netherlands	Europe	Ajax	Association football
Silesian Stadium	55,211	Chorzów	Poland	Europe	Poland national football team, Ruch Chorzów	Association football, speedway, athletics
Etihad Stadium	55,097	Manchester	United Kingdom	Europe	Manchester City F.C.	Association football
Arena Națională	55,000	Bucharest	Romania	Europe	Romania national football team, FCSB	Association football
Singapore National Stadium	55,000	Singapore	Singapore	Southeast Asia	Singapore national football team	Association football, rugby, cricket, athletics
Rajiv Gandhi International Cricket Stadium	55,000	Hyderabad	India	South Asia	Indian National Cricket team, Sunrisers Hyderabad	Cricket, athletics
Bobby Dodd Stadium	55,000	Atlanta	United States	North America	Georgia Tech Yellow Jackets football	American football
Estadio Latinoamericano	55,000	Havana	Cuba	South America	Industriales, Metropolitanos	Baseball
Helong Sports Center Stadium	55,000	Changsha, Hunan	China	East Asia	Hunan Billows F.C. (Hunan Xiangtao)	Association football
Semple Stadium	55,000	Thurles	Ireland	Europe	Tipperary GAA	Hurling, Gaelic football
Moi International Sports Centre	55,000	Nairobi	Kenya	Africa	Kenya national football team	Association football
National Stadium	55,000	Kaohsiung	Taiwan	East Asia		Association football
Plovdiv Stadium	55,000	Plovdiv	Bulgaria	Europe	junior football teams	Association football, athletics
Stadio Diego Armando Maradona	54,726	Naples	Italy	Europe	Napoli	Association football
Tianjin Olympic Centre Stadium	54,696	Tianjin	China	East Asia	Tianjin Jinmen Tiger	Association football
Esprit Arena	54,600	Düsseldorf	Germany	Europe	Fortuna Düsseldorf	Association football
Estadi Olímpic Lluís Companys	54,367	Barcelona	Spain	Europe	FC Barcelona	Athletics, association football
BC Place	54,320	Vancouver	Canada	North America	BC Lions, Vancouver Whitecaps FC	Canadian football, association football
Yankee Stadium	54,251	New York City	United States	North America	New York Yankees, New York City FC	Baseball, association football
Hrazdan Stadium	54,208	Yerevan	Armenia	Western Asia	Armenia national football team	Association football
War Memorial Stadium	54,120	Little Rock, Arkansas	United States	North America	Arkansas Razorbacks football*	American football
Borussia-Park	54,067	Mönchengladbach	Germany	Europe	Borussia Mönchengladbach	Association football
Moses Mabhida Stadium	54,000	Durban	South Africa	Africa		Association football
Autzen Stadium	54,000	Eugene, Oregon	United States	North America	Oregon Ducks football	American football
Busan Asiad Stadium	53,864	Busan	South Korea	East Asia	Busan IPark	Association football
Folsom Field	53,750	Boulder, Colorado	United States	North America	Colorado Buffaloes football	American football
Estadio Único Diego Armando Maradona	53,600	La Plata	Argentina	South America	Club de Gimnasia y Esgrima La Plata*, Estudiantes de La Plata*	Association football
Mountain America Stadium	53,599	Tempe, Arizona	United States	North America	Arizona State Sun Devils football	American football
Adelaide Oval	53,500	Adelaide	Australia	Oceania	Australia national cricket team*, Southern Redbacks, Adelaide Strikers, Adelaide Crows, Port Adelaide Football Club	Cricket, Australian rules football
Estadio BBVA	53,460	Monterrey	Mexico	North America	C.F. Monterrey	Association football
Estadio Cuscatlán	53,400	San Salvador	El Salvador	North America	Alianza F.C., El Salvador national football team	Association football
Marvel Stadium	53,359	Melbourne	Australia	Oceania	Western Bulldogs, St Kilda FC, Carlton Football Club, Essendon Football Club, North Melbourne Football Club, Melbourne Renegades	Australian rules football, cricket, association football
Estádio Parque do Sabiá	53,350	Uberlândia	Brazil	South America	Uberlândia Esporte Clube	Association football
San Mamés	53,332	Bilbao	Spain	Europe	Athletic Bilbao	Association football
Boris Paichadze Stadium	53,279	Tbilisi	Georgia	Western Asia	FC Dinamo Tbilisi, Georgia national football team, Georgia national rugby union team	Association football, rugby union
Aleppo International Stadium	53,200	Aleppo	Syria	Western Asia	Al-Ittihad	Association football
National Stadium of Peru	53,086	Lima	Peru	South America	Peru national football team	Association football
Hill Dickinson Stadium	52,769	Liverpool	United Kingdom	Europe	Everton F.C.	Association football
Memorial Stadium	52,692	Bloomington, Indiana	United States	North America	Indiana Hoosiers football	American football
Wuhan Sports Center Stadium	52,672	Wuhan, Hubei	China	East Asia	Wuhan Zall F.C.	Association football
Nef Stadium	52,652	Istanbul	Turkey	Europe	Galatasaray S.K.	Association football
Franklin Field	52,593	Philadelphia	United States	North America	Penn Quakers football	American football, athletics
Şükrü Saracoğlu Stadium	52,530	Istanbul	Turkey	Western Asia	Fenerbahçe S.K.	Association football
Donbas Arena	52,518	Donetsk	Ukraine	Europe		Association football
Lang Park	52,500	Brisbane	Australia	Oceania	Queensland Maroons, Brisbane Broncos, Queensland Reds, Brisbane Roar, Australia Kangaroos*, Australia Wallabies*, Australia Socceroos*	Rugby league, rugby union, association football
SHI Stadium	52,454	Piscataway, New Jersey	United States	North America	Rutgers Scarlet Knights football	American football, association football, lacrosse
St James' Park	52,387	Newcastle upon Tyne	United Kingdom	Europe	Newcastle United F.C.	Association football
Bill Snyder Family Football Stadium	52,200	Manhattan, Kansas	United States	North America	Kansas State Wildcats football	American football
Estádio José Alvalade	52,095	Lisbon	Portugal	Europe	Sporting Clube de Portugal	Association football
Huainan Sports Stadium	52,080	Huainan, Anhui	China	East Asia	local football teams	Association football
Hampden Park	52,054	Glasgow	United Kingdom	Europe	Scotland national football team, Queen's Park F.C.	Association football
Kings Park Stadium	52,000	Durban	South Africa	Africa	Sharks, Sharks (Currie Cup), AmaZulu	Rugby union, association football
Estadio Monumental de Maturín	52,000	Maturín	Venezuela	South America	Monagas	Association football
Guiyang Olympic Sports Center	52,000	Guiyang, Guizhou	China	East Asia		Association football
Huanglong Stadium	51,971	Hangzhou, Zhejiang	China	East Asia	Hangzhou Greentown F.C.	Association football
SECU Stadium	51,802	College Park, Maryland	United States	North America	Maryland Terrapins football	American football, lacrosse
Loftus Versfeld Stadium	51,762	Pretoria	South Africa	Africa	Bulls, Blue Bulls, South Africa national rugby union team*, SuperSport United*	Rugby union, cricket, association football
Aviva Stadium	51,711	Dublin	Ireland	Europe	Ireland national rugby union team, Republic of Ireland national football team	Rugby union, association football
Ibrox Stadium	51,700	Glasgow	United Kingdom	Europe	Rangers F.C.	Association football
Hohhot City Stadium	51,632	Hohhot, Inner Mongolia	China	East Asia	local football teams	Association football
Sun Bowl Stadium	51,500	El Paso, Texas	United States	North America	UTEP Miners football	American football
Rice-Eccles Stadium	51,444	Salt Lake City	United States	North America	University of Utah Utes Football Team	American football
Shizuoka Stadium	51,349	Fukuroi	Japan	East Asia	Júbilo Iwata*, Shimizu S-Pulse*	Association football
İzmir Atatürk Stadium	51,295	İzmir	Turkey	Western Asia	Altay S.K.*, Göztepe,.*	Association football
Newlands Stadium	51,100	Cape Town	South Africa	Africa		
Bishkek Arena	51,000	Bishkek	Kyrgyzstan	Central Asia	Kyrgyzstan national football team	Soccer
Dowdy–Ficklen Stadium	51,000	Greenville, North Carolina	United States	North America	East Carolina Pirates football	American football
Huntington Bank Stadium	51,805	Minneapolis	United States	North America	Minnesota Golden Gophers football	American football
Hocine Aït Ahmed Stadium	50,766	Tizi Ouzou	Algeria	Africa	JS Kabylie	Association football
Strawberry Arena	50,653	Stockholm	Sweden	Europe	AIK, Sweden men's national football team	Association football
Independence Stadium	50,459	Shreveport, Louisiana	United States	North America	Independence Bowl	American football
Coors Field	50,445	Denver, Colorado	United States	North America	Colorado Rockies	Baseball
Stanford Stadium	50,424	Stanford, California	United States	North America	Stanford Cardinal football	American football
Incheon Munhak Stadium	50,256	Incheon	South Korea	East Asia		Association football
Stade Pierre-Mauroy	50,186	Villeneuve-d'Ascq	France	Europe	Lille OSC	Association football
Ekana International Cricket Stadium	50,100	Lucknow	India	South Asia	Lucknow Super Giants	Cricket
Ajinomoto Stadium	50,100	Chōfu	Japan	East Asia	FC Tokyo, Tokyo Verdy	Association football
David Booth Kansas Memorial Stadium	50,071	Lawrence, Kansas	United States	North America	Kansas Jayhawks football	American football
Estádio do Dragão	50,033	Porto	Portugal	Europe	FC Porto	Association football
King Baudouin Stadium	50,024	Brussels	Belgium	Europe	Belgium national football team	Association football, athletics
Brabourne Stadium	50,000	Mumbai	India	South Asia	Bombay Quadrangular, Rajasthan Royals	Cricket
Japoma Stadium	50,000	Douala	Cameroon	Africa	Union Douala, New Star de Douala, Les Astres FC	Association football
JSCA International Cricket Stadium	50,000	Ranchi	India	South Asia	India national cricket team, Jharkhand cricket team	Cricket
Kozhikode Corporation EMS Stadium	50,000	Kozhikode	India	South Asia	Gokulam Kerala	Association football, Cricket
Kim Il-sung Stadium	50,000	Pyongyang	North Korea	East Asia	Pyongyang City Sports Group	Association football
Charles Mopeli Stadium	50,000	Phuthaditjhaba	South Africa	Africa	Free State Stars*	Association football
Eden Park	50,000	Auckland	New Zealand	Oceania	Auckland Blues, New Zealand national rugby union team*, Auckland Aces*, New Zealand national cricket team*	Rugby union, cricket
Edion Stadium Hiroshima	50,000	Hiroshima	Japan	East Asia	Sanfrecce Hiroshima	Association football
Nagai Stadium	50,000	Osaka	Japan	East Asia	Cerezo Osaka	Association football, athletics
Stade du 26 Mars	50,000	Bamako	Mali	Africa	Stade Malien	Association football
Sultan Mizan Zainal Abidin Stadium	50,000	Kuala Terengganu	Malaysia	Southeast Asia	Terengganu FC	Association football, athletics
Pars Stadium	50,000	Shiraz	Iran	Western Asia		Association football
Henan Provincial Stadium	50,000	Zhengzhou, Henan	China	East Asia	local football teams	Association football
Xinjiang Sports Centre	50,000	Ürümqi, Xinjiang	China	East Asia	local football teams	Association football
Wenzhou Olympic Sports Center Stadium	50,000	Wenzhou, Zhejiang	China	East Asia		Association football
Estádio 11 de Novembro	50,000	Luanda	Angola	Africa		Association football
Guangzhou University City Stadium	50,000	Guangzhou, Guangdong	China	East Asia	local football teams	Association football
Jiangxi Olympic Sports Center	50,000	Nanchang, Jiangxi	China	East Asia	local football teams	Association football, athletics
Max-Morlock-Stadion	50,000	Nuremberg	Germany	Europe	1. FC Nürnberg	Association football
RheinEnergieStadion	50,000	Cologne	Germany	Europe	1. FC Köln	Association football
Qingdao Youth Football Stadium	50,000	Qingdao, Shandong	China	East Asia	Qingdao Hainiu	Association football
Kai Tak Stadium	50,000	Hong Kong	China	East Asia	Hong Kong national football team, Hong Kong national rugby union team	Association football, Rugby union

=== Capacity of 40,000–49,999 ===
Stadium	Capacity	City (state)	Country	Region	Tenants	Sport(s)
De Kuip	49,850	Rotterdam	Netherlands	Europe	Feyenoord	Association football
Fritz-Walter-Stadion	49,780	Kaiserslautern	Germany	Europe	1. FC Kaiserslautern	Association football
José Amalfitani Stadium	49,540	Buenos Aires	Argentina	South America	Club Atlético Vélez Sarsfield, Argentina national rugby union team*, Jaguares	Association football, rugby union
Camille Chamoun Sports City Stadium	49,500	Beirut	Lebanon	Western Asia	Lebanon national football team	Association football
Rajko Mitić Stadium	49,450	Belgrade	Serbia	Europe	Red Star Belgrade	Association football
Mestalla	49,430	Valencia	Spain	Europe	Valencia CF	Association football
JMA Wireless Dome	49,250	Syracuse, New York	United States	North America	Syracuse Orange football, Syracuse Orange men's basketball, Syracuse Orange men's lacrosse, Syracuse Orange women's basketball	American football, basketball, lacrosse
Miyagi Stadium	49,133	Rifu	Japan	East Asia	Vegalta Sendai*	Association football, athletics
Globe Life Park in Arlington	49,115	Arlington, Texas	United States	North America	Dallas Renegades, North Texas SC	American football, association football
Estádio Beira-Rio	49,055	Porto Alegre	Brazil	South America	Sport Club Internacional	Association football
Chase Field	49,033	Phoenix, Arizona	United States	North America	Arizona Diamondbacks	Baseball
Niedersachsenstadion	49,000	Hanover	Germany	Europe	Hannover 96	Association football
Queensland Sport and Athletics Centre	49,000	Brisbane	Australia	Oceania		Rugby league, Athletics
Jinnah Sports Stadium	48,900	Islamabad	Pakistan	South Asia	Pakistan national football team*	Association football, athletics
Oriole Park at Camden Yards	48,876	Baltimore	United States	North America	Baltimore Orioles	Baseball
Parc des Princes	48,712	Paris	France	Europe	Paris Saint-Germain	Association football
Estadio Nacional Julio Martínez Prádanos	48,665	Santiago	Chile	South America	Chile national football team, Club Universidad de Chile*	Association football, athletics
Ernst-Happel-Stadion	48,500	Vienna	Austria	Europe	Austria national football team, FK Austria Wien*, SK Rapid Wien*	Association football
Khalifa International Stadium	48,496	Doha	Qatar	Western Asia	Qatar national football team	Association football
Nelson Mandela Bay Stadium	48,459	Port Elizabeth	South Africa	Africa	Southern Kings, Eastern Province Elephants	Rugby union, association football
Stadium of Light	48,339	Sunderland	United Kingdom	Europe	Sunderland A.F.C.	Association football
Estadio Tomás Adolfo Ducó	48,314	Buenos Aires	Argentina	South America	Club Atlético Huracán	Association football
T-Mobile Park	48,116	Seattle	United States	North America	Seattle Mariners	Baseball
Estadio Akron	48,071	Zapopan	Mexico	North America	Guadalajara	Association football
Rajamangala Stadium	48,000	Bangkok	Thailand	Southeast Asia	Thailand national football team	Association football
Harbin International Convention Exhibition and Sports Center	48,000	Harbin	China	East Asia		Athletics
Sydney Cricket Ground	48,000	Sydney	Australia	Oceania	Australia national cricket team*, Sydney Roosters, New South Wales Blues (cricket), Sydney 6ers, Sydney Swans, Sydney FC	Cricket, Australian rules football, rugby league, Association football
Estadio Malvinas Argentinas	48,000	Mendoza	Argentina	South America	Ciudad de Mendoza	Association football
Casa de Apostas Arena Fonte Nova	47,915	Salvador	Brazil	South America	Esporte Clube Bahia	Association football
Koshien Stadium	47,757	Nishinomiya	Japan	East Asia	Hanshin Tigers	Baseball
Fisht Olympic Stadium	47,659	Sochi	Russia	Europe	PFC Sochi	Association football, athletics
Ahmad bin Ali Stadium	47,343	Al Rayyan	Qatar	Western Asia		Association football
Arena Corinthians	47,252	São Paulo	Brazil	South America	Sport Club Corinthians Paulista	Association football
Protective Stadium	47,100	Birmingham	United States	North America	Birmingham Legion FC, Birmingham Stallions, UAB Blazers	American football, association football
Estadio Monumental David Arellano	47,017	Santiago	Chile	South America	Colo-Colo	Association football
First Community Stadium	47,000	Houston	United States	North America	Rice Owls football	American football
Estádio Olímpico Nilton Santos	46,931	Rio de Janeiro	Brazil	South America	Botafogo	Association football, athletics
Busch Stadium	46,861	St. Louis	United States	North America	St. Louis Cardinals	Baseball
Al Thumama Stadium	46,781	Doha	Qatar	Western Asia		Association football
Education City Stadium	46,155	Al Rayyan	Qatar	Western Asia		Association football
Peter Mokaba Stadium	46,000	Polokwane	South Africa	Africa		Association football
Estádio Prudentão	45,954	Presidente Prudente	Brazil	South America		Association football
Stade Mohammed V	45,891	Casablanca	Morocco	North Africa	Wydad AC, Raja Casablanca, TAS de Casablanca, Morocco national football team	Association football
Tokyo Dome	45,600	Tokyo	Japan	East Asia	Yomiuri Giants	Baseball
Volgograd Arena	45,568	Volgograd	Russia	Europe	FC Rotor Volgograd	Association football
Amahoro National Stadium	45,508	Kigali	Rwanda	Africa	APR F.C., Rwanda national football team, Rayon Sports F.C., S.C. Kiyovu Sports...	Association football
Páirc Uí Chaoimh	45,500	Cork	Ireland	Europe	Cork GAA	Hurling, Gaelic football
Ramón Sánchez Pizjuán Stadium	45,500	Seville	Spain	Europe	Sevilla FC	Association football
Adrar Stadium	45,480	Agadir	Morocco	Africa	Hassania Agadir	Association football
Arena Pernambuco	45,440	São Lourenço da Mata	Brazil	South America	Clube Náutico Capibaribe	Association football
Arena MRV	45,414	Belo Horizonte	Brazil	South America	Atlético Mineiro	Association football
Lukoil Arena	45,360	Moscow	Russia	Europe	FC Spartak Moscow	Association football
DY Patil Stadium	45,300	Navi Mumbai	India	South Asia	Mumbai Indians*, Indian national football team, Mumbai City FC	Cricket, Association football
Mandela National Stadium	45,202	Kampala	Uganda	Africa	Uganda national football team	Association football
McLane Stadium	45,140	Waco, Texas	United States	North America	Baylor Bears football	American football
Wrocław Stadium	45,105	Wrocław	Poland	Europe	Śląsk Wrocław	Association football
Kazan Arena	45,105	Kazan	Russia	Europe	FC Rubin Kazan	Association football, athletics
Estadio Garcilaso	45,056	Cusco	Peru	South America	Cienciano	Association football
Angel Stadium	45,050	Anaheim, California	United States	North America	Los Angeles Angels	Baseball
Al Janoub Stadium	45,036	Al Wakrah	Qatar	Western Asia		Association football
Mangueirão	45,007	Belém	Brazil	South America	Paysandu Sport Club*, Clube do Remo*	Association football
Egyptian Army Stadium	45,000	Suez	Egypt	Africa	Petrojet	Association football
24 February 1956 Stadium	45,000	Sidi Bel Abbès	Algeria	Africa	USM Bel Abbès	Association football
Estádio Olímpico Monumental	45,000	Porto Alegre	Brazil	South America		Association football
Gelora Bung Tomo Stadium	45,000	Surabaya	Indonesia	Southeast Asia	Persebaya Surabaya	Association football, athletics
Ashgabat Olympic Stadium	45,000	Ashgabat	Turkmenistan	Central Asia	Turkmenistan national football team	Association football
Harapan Bangsa Stadium	45,000	Banda Aceh	Indonesia	Southeast Asia	Persiraja Banda Aceh	Association football
Lahore National Hockey Stadium	45,000	Lahore	Pakistan	South Asia	Pakistan national field hockey team	Field hockey
Estadio General Pablo Rojas	45,000	Asunción	Paraguay	South America	Cerro Porteño	Association football
Barabati Stadium	45,000	Cuttack	India	South Asia	Odisha Cricket Association	Cricket
Qingdao Conson Stadium	45,000	Qingdao	China	East Asia		Association football
Estádio da Machava	45,000	Maputo	Mozambique	Africa	Mozambique national football team	Association football
Morenão	45,000	Campo Grande	Brazil	South America	Federal University of Mato Grosso do Sul	Association football
Fez Stadium	45,000	Fes	Morocco	Africa	Maghreb de Fès	Association football
Free State Stadium	45,000	Bloemfontein	South Africa	Africa	Free State Cheetahs, Cheetahs, Bloemfontein Celtic	Rugby union
Rostov Arena	45,000	Rostov-on-Don	Russia	Europe	FC Rostov	Association football
Citi Field	45,000	New York City	United States	North America	New York Mets	Baseball
Yantai Sports Park Stadium	45,000	Yantai, Shandong	China	East Asia	local football teams	Association football
Panathenaic Stadium	45,000	Athens	Greece	Europe		Athletics
Stade Omar Bongo	45,000	Libreville	Gabon	Africa	FC 105 Libreville	Association football
National Stadium	45,000	Lagos	Nigeria	Africa	Nigeria national football team*	Association football
Zibo Sports Center Stadium	45,000	Zibo, Shandong	China	East Asia	local football teams	Association football
Weifang Sports Center Stadium	45,000	Weifang, Shandong	China	East Asia	local football teams	Association football
Orlando Stadium	45,000	Johannesburg	South Africa	Africa	Orlando Pirates, Moroka Swallows	Association football
Zayed Sports City Stadium	45,000	Abu Dhabi	United Arab Emirates	Western Asia		Association football
Latakia Sports City Stadium	45,000	Latakia	Syria	Western Asia		Association football
Solidarnost Samara Arena	44,918	Samara	Russia	Europe	PFC Krylia Sovetov Samara	Association football
Vidarbha Cricket Association Stadium	44,904	Nagpur	India	South Asia	Vidarbha cricket team	Cricket
Nizhny Novgorod Stadium	44,899	Nizhny Novgorod	Russia	Europe	Pari NN	Association football
Estadio Atanasio Girardot	44,863	Medellín	Colombia	South America	Atlético Nacional, Independiente Medellín	Association football
Toyota Stadium	44,692	Toyota	Japan	East Asia	Nagoya Grampus*	Association football
Alumni Stadium	44,500	Boston (postal address Chestnut Hill)	United States	North America	Boston College Eagles football	American football
Greenfield International Stadium	44,400	Thiruvananthapuram	India	South Asia	India national cricket team, Kerala cricket team	Cricket and Association football
Acrisure Bounce House	44,206	Orange County, Florida (postal address Orlando)	United States	North America	UCF Knights football	American football
Albertão	44,200	Teresina	Brazil	South America	Esporte Clube Flamengo*	Association football
Gwangju World Cup Stadium	44,118	Gwangju	South Korea	East Asia	Gwangju FC	Association football
Ulsan Munsu Football Stadium	44,102	Ulsan	South Korea	East Asia	Ulsan HD	Association football
Bao'an Stadium	44,050	Shenzhen	China	East Asia	Shenzhen F.C.*	Association football
Gaelic Grounds	44,032	Limerick	Ireland	Europe	Limerick GAA	Hurling, Gaelic football
Amon G. Carter Stadium	44,008	Fort Worth, Texas	United States	North America	TCU Horned Frogs football	American football
Levy Mwanawasa Stadium	44,000	Ndola	Zambia	Africa	Zambia national football team	Association football
Suwon World Cup Stadium	43,959	Suwon	South Korea	East Asia	Suwon Samsung Bluewings	Association football
Riau Main Stadium	43,923	Pekanbaru	Indonesia	Southeast Asia	PSPS Riau	Association football
Allianz Parque	43,713	São Paulo	Brazil	South America	Palmeiras	Association football
Shandong Provincial Stadium	43,700	Jinan, Shandong	China	East Asia	local football teams	Association football
Citizens Bank Park	43,500	Philadelphia	United States	North America	Philadelphia Phillies	Baseball
Mbombela Stadium	43,500	Nelspruit	South Africa	Africa		Association football
Estadio Pedro Bidegain	43,494	Buenos Aires	Argentina	South America	Club Atlético San Lorenzo de Almagro	Association football
Jeonju World Cup Stadium	43,348	Jeonju	South Korea	East Asia	Jeonbuk Hyundai Motors	Association football
Progressive Field	43,345	Cleveland, Ohio	United States	North America	Cleveland Guardians	Baseball
Poznań Municipal Stadium	43,269	Poznań	Poland	Europe	Lech Poznań	Association football
Vasil Levski National Stadium	43,230	Sofia	Bulgaria	Europe	Bulgaria national football team	Association football
Estadio Libertadores de América	43,187	Avellaneda	Argentina	South America	Independiente	Association football
Reser Stadium	43,154	Corvallis, Oregon	United States	North America	Oregon State Beavers football	American football
Stadio Artemio Franchi	43,147	Florence	Italy	Europe	ACF Fiorentina	Association football
Shaanxi Province Stadium	43,000	Xi'an, Shaanxi	China	East Asia		Association football
Saifai International Cricket Stadium	43,000	Saifai	India	South Asia	Uttar Pradesh cricket team	Cricket
Estadio Universidad San Marcos	43,000	Lima	Peru	South America		Association football
Fitzgerald Stadium (Staidiam Mhic Gearailt)	43,000	Killarney	Ireland	Europe	Kerry GAA	Gaelic football, hurling
Ullevi	43,000	Gothenburg	Sweden	Europe		Association football, athletics
Arena da Amazônia	42,924	Manaus	Brazil	South America	Nacional Futebol Clube, Atlético Rio Negro Clube	Association football
Sapporo Dome	42,831	Sapporo	Japan	East Asia	Consadole Sapporo, Hokkaido Nippon-Ham Fighters	Association football, baseball
Arena Pantanal	42,788	Cuiabá	Brazil	South America	Clube Esportivo Dom Bosco, Mixto Esporte Clube	Association football
Villa Park	42,788	Birmingham	United Kingdom	Europe	Aston Villa F.C.	Association football
Zhuzhou Stadium	42,740	Zhuzhou, Hunan	China	East Asia	local football teams	Association football
Maharashtra Cricket Association Stadium	42,700	Pune	India	South Asia	Maharashtra Cricket Association	Cricket
Estadio Cuauhtémoc	42,648	Puebla	Mexico	North America	Puebla F.C.	Association football
Vodafone Park	42,590	Istanbul	Turkey	Europe	Beşiktaş J.K.	Association football
Red Bull Arena	42,558	Leipzig	Germany	Europe	RB Leipzig	Association football
Estadio Metropolitano de Mérida	42,500	Mérida	Venezuela	South America	Estudiantes de Mérida	Association football
Perak Stadium	42,500	Ipoh	Malaysia	Southeast Asia	Perak FA	Association football
Sydney Football Stadium	42,500	Sydney	Australia	Oceania	Sydney Roosters, New South Wales Waratahs, Sydney FC	Association football, Rugby league, Rugby union
Ahmadou Ahidjo Stadium	42,500	Yaoundé	Cameroon	Africa	Canon Yaoundé, Tonnerre Yaoundé, Louves Minproff	Association football
Estadio Defensores del Chaco	42,354	Asunción	Paraguay	South America	Paraguay national football team	Association football
Denka Big Swan Stadium	42,300	Niigata	Japan	East Asia	Albirex Niigata	Association football
American Family Field	42,200	Milwaukee	United States	North America	Milwaukee Brewers	Baseball
Estadio Hernando Siles	42,148	La Paz	Bolivia	South America	Bolivia national football team, La Paz F.C., Club Bolívar*, The Strongest*	Association football
Nouveau Stade de Bordeaux	42,115	Bordeaux	France	Europe	FC Girondins de Bordeaux, Union Bordeaux Bègles*	Association football, rugby union
Weserstadion	42,100	Bremen	Germany	Europe	Werder Bremen	Association football
Great American Ball Park	42,059	Cincinnati	United States	North America	Cincinnati Reds	Baseball
Estádio do Zimpeto	42,055	Maputo	Mozambique	Africa		Association football, athletics
The Gabba	42,000	Brisbane	Australia	Oceania	Australia national cricket team*, Queensland Bulls, Brisbane Heat, Brisbane Lions	Cricket, Australian rules football
McHale Park (Páirc Mhic Éil)	42,000	Castlebar	Ireland	Europe	Mayo GAA	Gaelic football, hurling
Estadio Universitario	42,000	San Nicolás de los Garza	Mexico	North America	Tigres UANL	Association football
Arena da Baixada	42,000	Curitiba	Brazil	South America	Athletico Paranaense	Association football
Chengdu Sports Centre	42,000	Chengdu, Sichuan	China	East Asia		Association football
Stade Geoffroy-Guichard	42,000	Saint-Étienne	France	Europe	AS Saint-Étienne	Association football
Royal Bafokeng Stadium	42,000	Phokeng	South Africa	Africa		Rugby union, association football, athletics
Konya Metropolitan Municipality Stadium	42,000	Konya	Turkey	Western Asia	Konyaspor	Association football
Estadio Deportivo Cali	42,000	Palmira	Colombia	South America	Deportivo Cali	Association football
Estadio Presidente Juan Domingo Perón	41,900	Avellaneda	Argentina	South America	Racing Club de Avellaneda	Association football
Darul Makmur Stadium	41,895	Kuantan	Malaysia	Southeast Asia	Pahang FA	Association football, Athletics
Nationals Park	41,888	Washington, D.C.	United States	North America	Washington Nationals	Baseball
Estadio Gigante de Arroyito	41,654	Rosario	Argentina	South America	Rosario Central	Association football
Wrigley Field	41,649	Chicago	United States	North America	Chicago Cubs	Baseball
Changchun Stadium	41,638	Changchun, Jilin	China	East Asia	Changchun Yatai	Association football
Stadion Gdańsk	41,620	Gdańsk	Poland	Europe	Lechia Gdańsk	Association football
Estadio Rodrigo Paz Delgado	41,575	Quito	Ecuador	South America	Liga Deportiva Universitaria	Association football
Estádio Serra Dourada	41,574	Goiânia	Brazil	South America	Goiás Esporte Clube*, Vila Nova Futebol Clube*	Association football
Juventus Stadium	41,507	Turin	Italy	Europe	Juventus FC	Association football
Wuyuan River Stadium	41,506	Haikou	China	East Asia		Athletics, concerts
Oracle Park	41,503	San Francisco	United States	North America	San Francisco Giants	Baseball, American football
Estadio Morelos	41,500	Morelia	Mexico	North America	Monarcas Morelia	Association football
Goyang Stadium	41,311	Goyang	South Korea	East Asia		Association football
Polideportivo Cachamay	41,300	Ciudad Guayana	Venezuela	South America	Mineros de Guayana	Association football
Daejeon World Cup Stadium	41,295	Daejeon	South Korea	East Asia	Daejeon Hana Citizen	Association football
Plaza de Toros México	41,262	Mexico City	Mexico	North America		Bullfighting
Marrakesh Stadium	41,245	Marrakesh	Morocco	Africa	Kawkab Marrakech, Morocco national football team	Association football
Daikin Park	41,168	Houston,	United States	North America	Houston Astros	Baseball
Truist Park	41,084	Cumberland, Georgia (postal address Atlanta)	United States	North America	Atlanta Braves	Baseball
Comerica Park	41,083	Detroit	United States	North America	Detroit Tigers	Baseball
Alejandro Villanueva Stadium	40,938	Lima	Peru	South America	Club Alianza Lima	Association football
Suzhou Olympic Sports Centre	40,933	Suzhou	China	East Asia		Athletics
Nelson Mandela Stadium	40,784	Algiers	Algeria	Africa		Association football
Şenol Güneş Sports Complex	40,782	Trabzon	Turkey	Western Asia	Trabzonspor	Association football
Kashima Soccer Stadium	40,728	Kashima	Japan	East Asia	Kashima Antlers	Association football
Valley Children's Stadium	40,727	Fresno, California	United States	North America	Fresno State Bulldogs football	American football
Estadio Campeón del Siglo	40,700	Montevideo	Uruguay	South America	Club Atlético Peñarol	Association football
Guaranteed Rate Field	40,615	Chicago	United States	North America	Chicago White Sox	Baseball
Taipei Dome	40,575	Taipei, Taiwan	Taiwan	East Asia	TBD	Baseball
Baba Yara Stadium	40,528	Kumasi	Ghana	Africa	Asante Kotoko, King Faisal Babes	Association football
Estádio Couto Pereira	40,502	Curitiba	Brazil	South America	Coritiba Foot Ball Club	Association football
Estadi Cornellà-El Prat	40,500	Barcelona	Spain	Europe	RCD Espanyol	Association football
Nagoya Dome	40,500	Nagoya	Japan	East Asia	Chunichi Dragons	Baseball
Estadio Monumental Virgen de Chapi	40,370	Arequipa	Peru	South America	FBC Melgar, IDUNSA	Association football
Stamford Bridge	40,343	Fulham, Greater London	United Kingdom	Europe	Chelsea F.C.	Association football
Estadio Ciudad de Lanús – Néstor Díaz Pérez	40,320	Lanús	Argentina	South America	Club Atlético Lanús	Association football
Estadio Metropolitano de Cabudare	40,312	Cabudare	Venezuela	South America	Unión Lara	Association football
Globe Life Field	40,300	Arlington	United States	North America	Texas Rangers	Baseball
Lukas Enembe Stadium	40,263	Jayapura	Indonesia	Southeast Asia		Association football, athletics
Mỹ Đình National Stadium	40,192	Hanoi	Vietnam	Southeast Asia	Vietnam national football team, Viettel FC	Association football
Miloud Hadefi Stadium	40,143	Oran	Algeria	Africa	MC Oran, Algeria national football team	Association football
Estadio George Capwell	40,024	Guayaquil	Ecuador	South America	Club Sport Emelec	Association football
OSC Metalist	40,003	Kharkiv	Ukraine	Europe	Metalist 1925 Kharkiv, Shakhtar Donetsk	Association football
Anoeta Stadium	40,000	Donostia-San Sebastián	Spain	Europe	Real Sociedad	Association football
Jawaharlal Nehru Stadium	40,000	Kochi	India	South Asia	Kerala Blasters FC, India national football team	Association football
Jawaharlal Nehru Stadium, Chennai	40,000	Chennai	India	South Asia	India national football team*, Chennaiyin FC, Indian Bank Recreational Club	Association football
Ladd–Peebles Stadium	40,000	Mobile, Alabama	United States	North America	South Alabama Jaguars football	American football
Batakan Stadium	40,000	Balikpapan	Indonesia	Southeast Asia	Persiba Balikpapan	Association football
TDECU Stadium	40,000	Houston	United States	North America	Houston Cougars football, Houston Roughnecks	American football
Hang Jebat Stadium	40,000	Malacca	Malaysia	Southeast Asia	Melaka F.C.*,	Association football
Resonac Dome Oita	40,000	Ōita	Japan	East Asia	Oita Trinita	Association football
Sultan Ibrahim Stadium	40,000	Johor	Malaysia	Southeast Asia	Johor Darul Ta'zim FC	
People's Football Stadium	40,000	Karachi	Pakistan	South Asia	Pakistan national football team	Association football
Castelão	40,000	São Luís	Brazil	South America	Moto Club, Sampaio Corrêa	Association football
Hong Kong Stadium	40,000	Hong Kong	China	East Asia	Hong Kong national football team, Hong Kong national rugby union team	Association football, Rugby union
JRD Tata Sports Complex	40,000	Jamshedpur	India	South Asia	local football teams	Association football
28 March Stadium	40,000	Benghazi	Libya	Africa	Al-Ahly Benghazi, Al-Nasr Benghazi, Al Tahaddy Benghazi, Libya national football team*	Association football
Penang State Stadium	40,000	Batu Kawan	Malaysia	Southeast Asia	Penang FA*	Association football
Accra Sports Stadium	40,000	Accra	Ghana	Africa	Accra Hearts of Oak, Accra Great Olympics	Association football
Pratt & Whitney Stadium	40,000	East Hartford, Connecticut	United States	North America	UConn Huskies football	American football
Sarawak Stadium	40,000	Kuching	Malaysia	Southeast Asia	Sarawak FA	Association football
Stade d'Angondjé	40,000	Angondjé	Gabon	Africa	Gabon national football team	Association football
Bogyoke Aung San Stadium	40,000	Yangon	Myanmar	Southeast Asia	local football teams	Association football
Vidarbha Cricket Association Ground	40,000	Nagpur	India	South Asia	Vidarbha cricket team	Cricket
Suita City Football Stadium	40,000	Suita	Japan	East Asia	Gamba Osaka	Association football
Peace Stadium	40,000	Bouake	Ivory Coast	Africa	Bouaké FC, ASC Bouaké, Alliance Bouaké	Association football
Wuhu Olympic Stadium	40,000	Wuhu, Anhui	China	East Asia	local football teams	Association football
Hauptstadion	40,000	Aachen	Germany	Europe	Aachen-Laurensberger Rennverein	Equestrian and show jumping
Xining Stadium	40,000	Xining	China	East Asia	local football teams	Association football
Shaoxing China Textile City Sports Center	40,000	Shaoxing	China	East Asia		Athletics
Anqing Sports Centre Stadium	40,000	Anqing	China	East Asia		Athletics
Monumental Stadium of Caracas Simón Bolívar	40,000	Caracas	Venezuela	South America	Leones del Caracas	Baseball
Kardinia Park	40,000	Geelong	Australia	Oceania	Geelong Cats, Melbourne Renegades*	Cricket, Australian rules football

== See also ==
- Lists of stadiums
- List of African stadiums by capacity
- List of American football stadiums by capacity
- List of Asian stadiums by capacity
- List of association football stadiums by capacity
- List of association football stadiums by country
- List of attendance figures at domestic professional sports leagues
- List of baseball parks by capacity
- List of basketball arenas by capacity
- List of closed stadiums by capacity
- List of covered stadiums by capacity
- List of cricket grounds by capacity
- List of East Asia stadiums by capacity
- List of European stadiums by capacity
- List of future stadiums
- List of GAA Stadiums by Capacity
- List of horse racing venues by capacity
- List of motor racing venues by capacity
- List of North American stadiums by capacity
- List of Oceanian stadiums by capacity
- List of rugby union stadiums by capacity
- List of South American stadiums by capacity
- List of Southeast Asia stadiums by capacity
- List of sporting venues with a highest attendance of 100,000 or more
- List of sports attendance figures
- List of sports venues by capacity
- List of tennis stadiums by capacity
- List of ice hockey arenas by capacity
- List of bullrings by capacity
- List of track and field stadiums by capacity
