= List of Southeast Asia stadiums by capacity =

The following is an incomplete list of sports stadiums in Southeast Asia. They are ordered by their capacity, that is the maximum number of spectators the stadium can normally accommodate, therefore excluding temporary extra accommodations.

== Capacity of 30,000 or more ==
Stadium	Capacity	Country	City	Image	Home team(s)	Opened
Bukit Jalil National Stadium	87,411	Malaysia	Kuala Lumpur		Malaysia national football team	1998
Jakarta International Stadium	82,000	Indonesia	Jakarta		Persija Jakarta	2022
Gelora Bung Karno Stadium	77,193	Indonesia	Jakarta		Indonesia national football team	1962
Morodok Techo National Stadium	60,000	Cambodia	Phnom Penh		Cambodia national football team	2021
Singapore National Stadium	55,000	Singapore			Singapore national football team	2014
Kai Tak Stadium	50,000	Hong Kong			Hong Kong national football team Hong Kong national rugby union team	2024
Sultan Mizan Zainal Abidin Stadium	50,000	Malaysia	Kuala Terengganu		Terengganu FC	2008
Rajamangala National Stadium	51,560	Thailand	Bangkok		Thailand national football team	1998
Gelora Bung Tomo Stadium	46,806	Indonesia	Surabaya		Persebaya Surabaya	2010
Harapan Bangsa Stadium	40,000	Indonesia	Banda Aceh		Persiraja Banda Aceh	1997
Tuanku Abdul Rahman Stadium	45,000	Malaysia	Paroi		Negeri Sembilan FC, KSR SAINS F.C.	1992
Shah Alam Stadium	45,000	Malaysia	Shah Alam		Selangor F.C.	2026
Riau Main Stadium	43,923	Indonesia	Pekanbaru		PSPS Riau	2012
Kanjuruhan Stadium	21,603	Indonesia	Malang		Arema F.C., Persekam Metro F.C.	2004
Darul Makmur Stadium	40,000	Malaysia	Kuantan		Sri Pahang FC	1970
Lukas Enembe Stadium	40,263	Indonesia	Sentani		Persipura Jayapura (proposed)	2019
Mỹ Đình National Stadium	40,192	Vietnam	Hanoi		Vietnam national football team	2003
Batakan Stadium	40,000	Indonesia	Balikpapan		Persiba Balikpapan	2017
Gelora Joko Samudro Stadium	40,000	Indonesia	Gresik		Gresik United	2017
Hang Jebat Stadium	40,000	Malaysia	Malacca		Melaka United F.C.	2004
Penang State Stadium	40,000	Malaysia	Batu Kawan		Penang FA (2001–present; some games) SDMS Kepala Batas (2007–2012)	2000
Sarawak Stadium	40,000	Malaysia	Kuching		Kuching City F.C.	1997
Sultan Ibrahim Stadium	40,000	Malaysia	Iskandar Puteri		Johor Darul Ta'zim F.C.	2020
Bogyoke Aung San Stadium	40,000	Myanmar	Yangon		Yangon United FC	1985
Gelora Bandung Lautan Api Stadium	38,000	Indonesia	Bandung		Persib Bandung	2013
Palaran Stadium	35,000	Indonesia	Samarinda		PON KALTIM Football Team	2008
Gelora Delta Stadium	35,000	Indonesia	Sidoarjo		Deltras F.C., Persida Sidoarjo, Hizbul Wathan F.C.	2000
Aji Imbut Stadium	35,000	Indonesia	Tenggarong		PS Mitra Kukar	2008
Mandala Krida Stadium	35,000	Indonesia	Yogyakarta		PSIM Yogyakarta	1976
Sultan Agung Stadium	35,000	Indonesia	Bantul		Persiba Bantul	2007
Likas Stadium	35,000	Malaysia	Kota Kinabalu		Sabah F.C.	2001
Zayarthiri Stadium	35,000	Myanmar	Naypyidaw			2012
Chang Arena	32,600	Thailand	Buriram		Buriram United F.C.	2011
Darul Aman Stadium	32,387	Malaysia	Alor Setar		Kedah Darul Aman F.C.	1962
Thuwunna Stadium	32,000	Myanmar	Yangon		Myanmar national football team	1985
Mandalarthiri Stadium	31,270	Myanmar	Mandalay		Myanmar women's national football team, I.S.P.E F.C.	2013
Perak Stadium	30,000	Malaysia	Ipoh		Perak F.C.	1965
Tan Sri Dato Hj Hassan Yunos Stadium	30,000	Malaysia	Johor Bahru		Johor Darul Ta'zim II F.C.	1964
Kaharudin Nasution Stadium	30,000	Indonesia	Pekanbaru		PSPS Riau	1980
Pakansari Stadium	30,000	Indonesia	Bogor		Persikabo 1973	2015
Wibawa Mukti Stadium	30,000	Indonesia	Bekasi		Persikasi Bekasi	2014
Patriot Candrabhaga Stadium	30,000	Indonesia	Bekasi		Persipasi Bekasi	1982
Wunna Theikdi Stadium	30,000	Myanmar	Naypyidaw		Nay Pyi Taw F.C.	2012
Lạch Tray Stadium	30,000	Vietnam	Hai Phong		Haiphong FC	1958
Thiên Trường Stadium	30,000	Vietnam	Nam Định		Nam Dinh FC	2003
Cần Thơ Stadium	30,000	Vietnam	Cần Thơ		XSKT Can Tho F.C.	1953
Phnom Penh National Olympic Stadium	30,000	Cambodia	Phnom Penh		Cambodia national football team	1964

== Other stadiums which hosted main competitions ==
Image	Stadium	Capacity	City	Country	Home team(s)	Competition
	Si Jalak Harupat Stadium	30,100	Bandung	Indonesia	Persib Bandung	2008 AFF Championship / 2018 Asian Games
	Hassanal Bolkiah National Stadium	28,000	Bandar Seri Begawan	Brunei	Brunei national football team, Brunei DPMM FC	1999 Southeast Asian Games
	New Laos National Stadium	25,000	Vientiane	Laos	Laos national football team	2009 Southeast Asian Games / 2018 AFF Championship / 2022 AFF Championship
	Philippine Sports Stadium	25,000	Bocaue	Philippines	Philippines national football team	2016 AFF Championship
	700th Anniversary Stadium	25,000	Chiang Mai	Thailand	Chiangmai F.C., Chiangmai United	1995 Southeast Asian Games / 1998 Asian Games / 2000 AFF Championship
	Thammasat Stadium	25,000	Pathum Thani	Thailand	Bangkok United	1998 Asian Games / 2022 AFF Championship
	Thupatemi Stadium	25,000	Pathum Thani	Thailand	Air Force Central F.C.	1998 Asian Games
	Army Stadium	25,000	Ho Chi Minh City	Vietnam	Tổng Tham Mưu (1952–1975) Quân khu 7 F.C. (2000–2008) Thép Miền Nam Cảng Sài Gòn (2007)	2003 Southeast Asian Games / 2007 AFC Asian Cup
	Petaling Jaya Stadium	25,000	Petaling Jaya	Malaysia	Petaling Jaya Rangers, Petaling Jaya City	2001 Southeast Asian Games
	80th Birthday Stadium	24,641	Nakhon Ratchasima	Thailand	Nakhon Ratchasima F.C.	2007 Southeast Asian Games
	Gelora Sriwijaya Stadium	23,000	Palembang	Indonesia	Sriwijaya FC	2007 AFC Asian Cup / 2010 AFF Championship / 2011 Southeast Asian Games / 2018 Asian Games
	Hanoi Stadium	22,500	Hanoi	Vietnam	Hanoi FC, Viettel	1998 AFF Championship / 2003 Southeast Asian Games / 2014 AFF Championship / 2018 AFF Championship
	Tinsulanon Stadium	20,000	Songkhla	Thailand	Songkhla United	1998 Asian Games / 2000 AFF Championship
	Royal Thai Army Stadium	20,000	Bangkok	Thailand		2007 AFF Championship
	Tuanku Syed Putra Stadium	20,000	Kangar	Malaysia	Perlis Northern Lion, Tambun Tulang	1997 FIFA World Youth Championship
	New Clark City Athletics Stadium	20,000	New Clark City	Philippines	United City (2021-)	2019 Southeast Asian Games
	Supachalasai Stadium	19,793	Bangkok	Thailand	Thailand national football team	1959 Southeast Asian Peninsular Games / 1966 Asian Games / 1967 Southeast Asian Peninsular Games / 1970 Asian Games / 1972 AFC Asian Cup / 1975 Southeast Asian Peninsular Games / 1978 Asian Games / 1985 Southeast Asian Games / 1998 Asian Games / 2007 AFC Asian Cup / 2012 AFF Championship
	Laos National Stadium	20,000	Vientiane	Laos	Laos national football team	2009 Southeast Asian Games
	Kuala Lumpur Stadium	18,000	Kuala Lumpur	Malaysia	Kuala Lumpur FA, UKM F.C.	2004 AFF Championship / 2018 AFF Championship / 2022 AFF Championship
	Việt Trì Stadium	20,000	Phú Thọ	Vietnam	Phú Thọ F.C.	2021 Southeast Asian Games
	Thống Nhất Stadium	16,000	Ho Chi Minh City	Vietnam	TP Hồ Chí Minh, Sài Gòn	1998 AFF Championship / 2003 Southeast Asian Games / 2004 AFF Championship
	Surakul Stadium	16,000	Phuket	Thailand	Phuket City F.C	2008 AFF Championship
	Selayang Municipal Council Stadium	16,000	Selayang	Malaysia	MK Land F.C. (2000-2006) Selangor United (2019), Selangor II (2020–present)	2017 Southeast Asian Games
	Cẩm Phả Stadium	16,000	Quảng Ninh	Vietnam	Than Quảng Ninh, Vietnam women's national football team	2021 Southeast Asian Games
	RCAF Old Stadium	15,000	Phnom Penh	Cambodia	National Defense Ministry FC	2023 Southeast Asian Games
	Nakhon Sawan Stadium	15,000	Nakhon Sawan	Thailand	Nakhon Sawan F.C. (2010-2011)	1998 Asian Games
	Marikina Sports Center	15,000	Marikina	Philippines	Marikina Shoemasters	2005 Southeast Asian Games
	Rizal Memorial Stadium	12,873	Manila	Philippines	Philippines national football team	1954 Asian Games / 1981 Southeast Asian Games / 1991 Southeast Asian Games / 2012 AFF Championship / 2014 AFF Championship / 2016 AFF Championship / 2019 Southeast Asian Games / 2022 AFF Championship
	Surat Thani Province Stadium	10,000	Surat Thani	Thailand	Surat Thani F.C. 2010-2012	1998 Asian Games
	Quirino Grandstand	10,000	Manila	Philippines	Philippines national football team	2005 Southeast Asian Games
	UiTM Stadium	10,000	Shah Alam	Malaysia	UiTM FC	2017 Southeast Asian Games
	Prince Stadium	10,000	Phnom Penh	Cambodia	Visakha FC	2022 AFF U-23 Youth Championship
	Panaad Stadium	9,825	Bacolod	Philippines	Philippines national football team, Ceres–Negros	2005 Southeast Asian Games / 2018 AFF Championship
	Thai-Japanese Stadium	6,600	Bangkok	Thailand		1998 Asian Games
	Bumi Sriwijaya Stadium	6,000	Palembang	Indonesia	PS Palembang Sriwijaya FC (2017)	2018 Asian Games
	Jalan Besar Stadium	6,000	Kallang	Singapore	Young Lions, Hougang United	2004 AFF Championship / 2007 AFF Championship / 2012 AFF Championship / 2014 AFF Championship / 2015 Southeast Asian Games / 2022 AFF Championship
	Bishan Stadium	3,500	Bishan	Singapore	Home United, Balestier Khalsa	2002 AFF Championship / 2015 Southeast Asian Games / 2020 AFF Championship
	Biñan Football Stadium	3,000	Biñan	Philippines	Philippine women's national football team	2019 Southeast Asian Games
	Municipal Stadium	2,000	Nakhon Ratchasima	Thailand		2007 Southeast Asian Games
	UM Arena Stadium	1,000	Kuala Lumpur	Malaysia	Protap, IKRAM Muda	2017 Southeast Asian Games

== See also ==
- List of Asian stadiums by capacity
- List of African stadiums by capacity
- List of European stadiums by capacity
- List of North American stadiums by capacity
- List of Oceanian stadiums by capacity
- List of South American stadiums by capacity
- Lists of stadiums
- List of stadiums by capacity
- List of football (soccer) stadiums by capacity
- List of sporting venues with a highest attendance of 100,000 or more
