= Shah Alam Stadium (2026) =

Future new development stadium in Shah Alam, Malaysia

Shah Alam Stadium Stadium Shah Alam ستاديوم شاه عالم
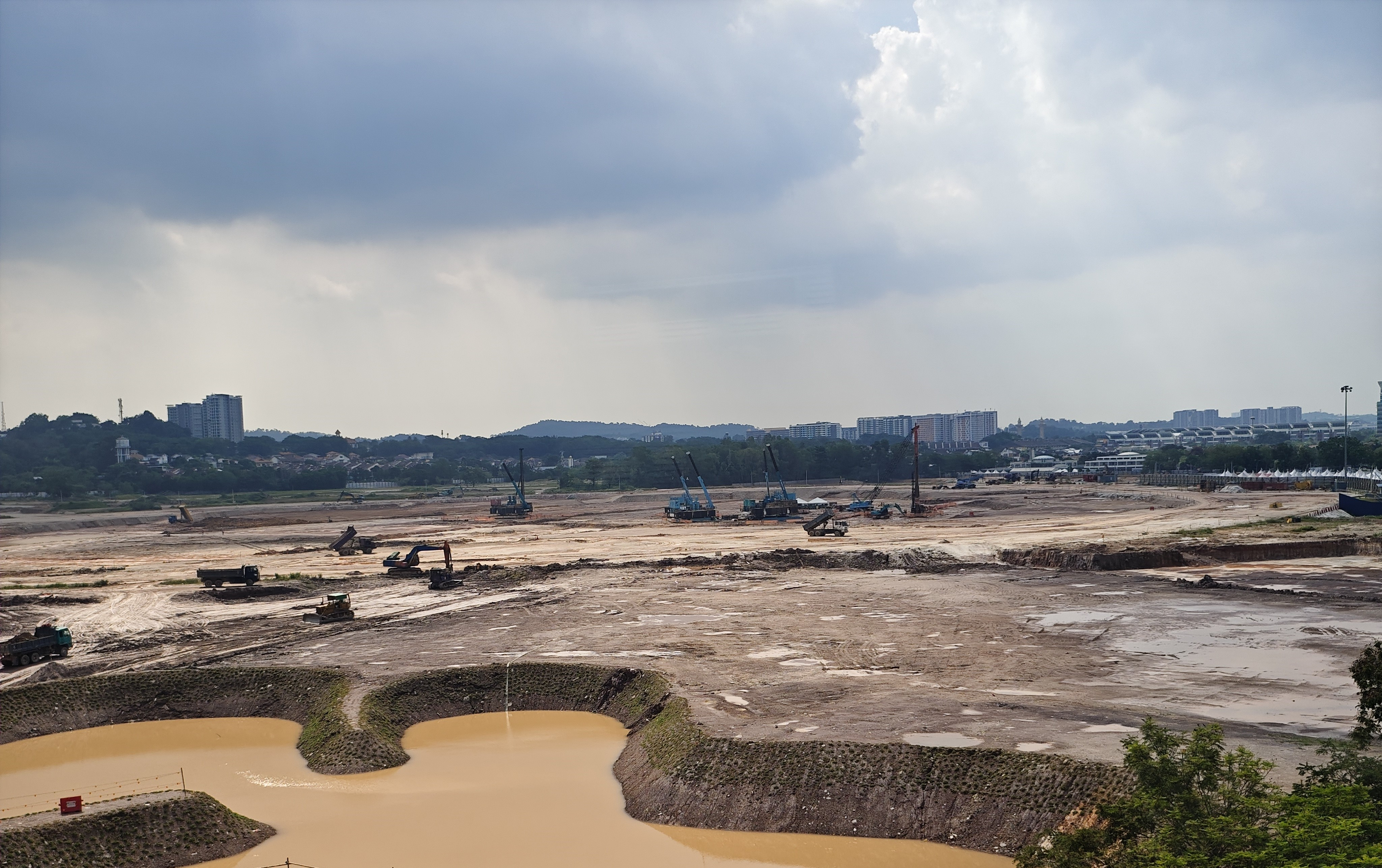
- Construction of Shah Alam Stadium on July 2026
- Interactive map of Shah Alam Stadium; Stadium Shah Alam ستاديوم شاه عالم
- Address: Persiaran Sukan, Seksyen 13, 40000 Shah Alam
- Location: Shah Alam, Selangor, Malaysia
- Coordinates: 3°4′56.1″N 101°32′41.8″E
- Owner: State Government of Selangor
- Operator: Darul Ehsan Facilities Management Sdn. Bhd.
- Capacity: 45,000 (expected)
- Surface: Paspalum
- Scoreboard: Digital scoreboard
- Public transit: KD10 Batu Tiga Komuter station; SA10 Stadium Shah Alam LRT station; SA02 SA05 Smart Selangor Bus

Construction
- Groundbreaking: 1 July 2024; 2 years ago
- Opened: 2029 (the Stadium); 2030 (the Sport Complex)
- Cost: RM787 million
- Architects: Malaysian Resources Corporation Berhad; Menteri Besar Selangor Incorporated; Populous

Tenant
- Selangor (2029–present)

The new Shah Alam Stadium (Malay: Stadium Shah Alam) will be a multi-purpose stadium located in Shah Alam, Selangor, Malaysia. It will be used mostly for football matches. The stadium will be the official home of the Red Giants (Selangor) since 2026, and is expected to have a capacity of 45,000.

Despite multiple renovation attempts over the years, the former stadium was in a state of disrepair resulting from long-term neglect in maintenance. In 2020, the Malaysian Football League (MFL) announced that the dilapidated stadium may be barred from hosting the Malaysia Super League matches, due to safety reasons arising from the stadium's polycarbonate roof and pitch being in a poor state. On 15 July 2022, the Menteri Besar of Selangor Amirudin Shari said that the Selangor government has appointed Malaysian Resources Corporation Berhad (MRCB) to refurbish the stadium and its surrounding sporting facilities which may cost up to RM787 million. The demolition and the reconstruction works of the stadium will be carried out simultaneously starting from 1 July 2024. The old stadium was completely torn down on 27 January 2025 and the new one is expected to re-open in 2026 (Phase 1) before SUKMA Games.

== History ==
The former stadium began demolition on 3 July 2024 to make way for a redevelopment that includes three phases. The first phase involves the demolition and reconstruction of the stadium, integrated terminal, parking plaza, recreation area and training field which is expected to be completed before SUKMA Games, which will held in Selangor in 2027. The second phase involves a shopping complex and indoor theatre which is expected to be completed in 2028. The final phase is the construction of a hotel which is expected to begin in 2029 to 2030. The main structure of the stadium was completely demolished on 27 January 2025 at exactly 10:30 am.

== See also ==
- Sport in Malaysia
- List of Southeast Asia stadiums by capacity
