= List of East Asia stadiums by capacity =

The following is an incomplete list of sports stadiums in East Asia. They are ordered by their capacity, that is the maximum number of spectators the stadium can normally accommodate, therefore excluding temporary extra accommodations.

== Capacity of 50,000 or more ==
Stadium	Capacity	City	Country	Tenants	Opened	Image
Rungrado 1st of May Stadium	114,000	Pyongyang	North Korea	Korea DPR national football team	1989	Rŭngrado May First Stadium
Beijing National Stadium	91,000	Beijing	China		2008	Beijing national stadium
Japan National Stadium	80,200	Tokyo	Japan	Japan national football team, Japan national rugby union team	2019	New National Stadium
Guangdong Olympic Stadium	80,012	Guangzhou	China		2001	Guangdong Olympic Stadium
Hangzhou Sports Park Stadium	80,000	Hangzhou	China	Zhejiang Professional F.C.	2018	
International Stadium Yokohama	72,327	Yokohama	Japan	Yokohama F. Marinos	1998	NISSANSTADIUM20080608
Shanghai Stadium	72,000	Shanghai	China		1999	
Seoul Olympic Stadium	69,950	Seoul	South Korea		1984	
Workers' Stadium	68,000	Beijing	China			Workers' Stadium
Seoul World Cup Stadium	66,704	Seoul	South Korea	South Korea national football team, FC Seoul	2001	
Daegu Stadium	66,422	Daegu	South Korea		2001	
Saitama Stadium 2002	63,700	Saitama	Japan	Urawa Red Diamonds	2001	Saitama Stadium 2002
Dalian Barracuda Bay Stadium	63,000	Dalian	China	Dalian Yingbo		
Shanxi Sports Centre Stadium	62,000	Taiyuan	China			Shanxi Sports Centre Stadium
Nanjing Olympic Sports Centre Stadium	61,443	Nanjing	China		2005	
Dalian Sports Centre Stadium	61,000	Dalian	China		2013	
Shenzhen Universiade Sports Centre	60,334	Shenzhen	China		2011	
Shenyang Olympic Sports Centre Stadium	60,000	Shenyang	China		2007	
Hohhot City Stadium	60,000	Hohhot	China		2017	
Hefei Olympic Sports Center Stadium	60,000	Hefei	China		2008	
Haixia Olympic Centre Stadium	60,000	Fuzhou	China			
Guangxi Sports Centre Stadium	60,000	Nanning	China		2010	
Ordos Sports Centre Stadium	60,000	Ordos	China			
Lanzhou Olympic Sports Centre Stadium	60,000	Lanzhou	China			
Xi'an Olympic Sports Centre Stadium	60,000	Xi'an	China			
Zhengzhou Olympic Sports Centre Stadium	60,000	Zhengzhou	China			
Chongqing Olympic Sports Centre Stadium	58,680	Chongqing	China		2004	
Jinan Olympic Sports Center Stadium	56,808	Jinan	China	Shandong Taishan F.C.	2009	
He Long Sports Centre Stadium	55,000	Changsha	China	Hunan Billows		
National Stadium	55,000	Kaohsiung	Taiwan	Chinese Taipei national football team, Taipower	2009	
Tianhe Stadium	54,856	Guangzhou	China		1987	
Tianjin Olympic Centre Stadium	54,696	Tianjin	China	Tianjin Jinmen Tiger F.C.	2007	
Wuhan Sports Centre Stadium	54,000	Wuhan	China		2002	
Busan Asiad Main Stadium	53,769	Busan	South Korea		2001	
Yellow Dragon Sports Center	52,672	Hangzhou	China	Zhejiang Professional F.C.	2000	
Guiyang Olympic Sports Centre Stadium	51,636	Guiyang	China		2010	
Shizuoka Stadium	50,889	Fukuroi	Japan		2001	
Shaanxi Province Stadium	50,100	Xi'an	China		1954	
Harbin ICE Sports Centre Stadium	50,000	Harbin	China			
Jiangxi Olympic Sports Centre Stadium	50,000	Nanchang	China		2010	
Qingdao Youth Football Stadium	50,000	Qingdao	China			
Kai Tak Sports Park Main Stadium	50,000	Hong Kong	China			

== See also ==
- Lists of stadiums
