= List of sporting venues with a highest attendance of 100,000 or more =

The following is an incomplete list of sports venues that currently have or once had a highest attendance of 100,000 people or more. Included are also those venues which have closed, been refurbished, or have been proposed.

== Current venues ==
This list is for those venues that are currently open for use and have a permanent structure (open venues such as for marathons are not considered). Their highest attendance may have occurred at a time when the configuration of venue was different, through the use of standing sections, or the use of infield areas. In the case of AT&T Stadium, the highest attendance was recorded for a basketball game, which used field-level seating not available for the venue's standard American football configuration. The largest sporting venue in the world, the Indianapolis Motor Speedway, has a permanent seating capacity for more than 257,000 people and infield seating that raises capacity to an approximate 400,000. Additionally, TPC Scottsdale during the Phoenix Open has the ability to hold 250,000 spectators in a single day, hosting 216,818 golf fans on February 3, 2018.

Rank	Venue name	Highest attendance (Note: Some capacities include standing places)	Location	Current seating capacity	Use	Image
1	Indianapolis Motor Speedway	350,000	Speedway, Indiana, United States	257,325	Motor racing	
2	Circuit de la Sarthe	325,000	Le Mans, France	100,000	Motor racing	
3	Ascot Racecourse	280,000	Ascot, England	80,000	Horse racing	
4	Tokyo Racecourse	223,000	Tokyo, Japan	13,750	Horse racing	
5	Autódromo Hermanos Rodríguez	221,011	Mexico City, Mexico	100,000	Motor racing	
6	Nürburgring-Nordschleife	220,000	Nürburg, Germany	220,000	Motor racing	
7	TPC Scottsdale-Stadium Course	216,818	Scottsdale, Arizona, United States	250,000	Golf	
8	Texas Motor Speedway	212,585	Fort Worth, Texas, United States	138,122	Motor racing	
9	Adelaide Street Circuit	210,000	Adelaide, Australia	200,000	Motor racing	
10	Aintree Racecourse	200,000	Aintree, England	75,000	Horse racing	
11	Badminton Park	200,000	Badminton, England	200,000	Eventing	
12	Shanghai International Circuit	200,000	Shanghai, China	200,000	Motor racing	
13	Estádio do Maracanã	199,854	Rio de Janeiro, Brazil	78,838	Association football	
14	Rungrado 1st of May Stadium	190,000	Pyongyang, North Korea	114,000	Association football, Mass games	
15	Talladega Superspeedway	175,000	Talladega, Alabama, United States	175,000	Motor racing	
16	Sebring International Raceway	169,000	Sebring, Florida, United States	175,000	Motor racing	
17	Daytona International Speedway	167,785	Daytona Beach, Florida, United States	167,785	Motor racing	
18	Charlotte Motor Speedway	167,000	Concord, North Carolina, United States	167,000	Motor racing	
19	Nakayama Racecourse	165,676	Chiba, Japan	165,676	Horse racing	
20	Bristol Motor Speedway	165,000	Bristol, Tennessee, United States	165,000	Motor racing, American football	
21	Churchill Downs	164,858	Louisville, Kentucky, United States	51,000	Horse racing	
22	Silverstone Circuit	164,000	Silverstone, England	150,000	Motor racing	
23	Las Vegas Motor Speedway	156,000	Las Vegas, Nevada, United States	142,000	Motor racing	
24	Suzuka Circuit	155,000	Suzuka, Japan	155,000	Motor racing	
25	Istanbul Park	155,000	Istanbul, Turkey	155,000	Motor racing	
26	Gelora Bung Karno Stadium	150,000	Jakarta, Indonesia	77,193	Association football	
27	Nürburgring-Südschleife	150,000	Nürburg, Germany	150,000	Motor racing	
28	Belmont Park	150,000	Elmont, New York, United States	33,000	Horse racing	
29	Circuit of the Americas	150,000	Austin, Texas, United States	120,000	Motor racing	
30	Hampden Park	149,547	Glasgow, Scotland	51,866	Association football	
31	Holmenkollbakken	143,000	Oslo, Norway	50,000	Ski jumping hill	
32	Circuit de Catalunya	140,000	Montmeló, Spain	140,000	Motor racing	
33	Fuji Speedway	140,000	Oyama, Japan	140,000	Motor racing	
34	Hanshin Racecourse	139,877	Hyogo, Japan	12,603	Horse racing	
35	Estádio do Morumbi	138,032	São Paulo, Brazil	66,795	Association football	
36	Michigan International Speedway	137,000	Brooklyn, Michigan, United States	137,243	Motor racing	
37	Estadio Azteca	136,274	Mexico City, Mexico	87,523	Association football, boxing	
38	Pimlico Race Course	135,256	Baltimore, Maryland, United States	43,000	Horse racing	
39	Korea International Circuit	135,000	Yeongam, South Korea	135,000	Motor racing	
40	Dover International Speedway	135,000	Dover, Delaware, United States	95,500	Motor racing and horse racing	
41	Mineirão	134,934	Belo Horizonte, Brazil	62,547	Association football	
42	Vivekananda Yuba Bharati Krirangan	134,781	Kolkata, India	85,000	Association football	
43	Flemington Racecourse	130,000	Melbourne, Australia	130,000	Horse racing	
44	Sepang International Circuit	130,000	Sepang, Malaysia	130,000	Motor racing	
45	Santiago Bernabéu Stadium	129,690	Madrid, Spain	81,044	Association football	
46	Azadi Stadium	128,000	Tehran, Iran	90,000	Association football	
47	San Siro	125,000	Milan, Italy	82,955	Association football	
48	Atlanta Motor Speedway	125,000	Hampton, Georgia, United States	125,000	Motor racing	
49	Melbourne Cricket Ground	121,696	Melbourne, Australia	100,024	Cricket, Australian rules football	
50	Cairo International Stadium	120,480	Cairo, Egypt	74,100	Association football	
51	Crystal Palace National Sports Centre	120,028	London, England	24,000	Association football	
52	Soldier Field	120,000	Chicago, Illinois, United States	61,000	American football	
53	Buddh International Circuit	120,000	Greater Noida, India	120,000	Motor racing	
54	Eden Gardens	120,000	Kolkata, India	65,000	Cricket	
55	Kyoto Racecourse	120,000	Kyoto, Japan	28,000	Horse racing	
56	Camp Nou	120,000	Barcelona, Spain	98,722	Association football	
57	Hockenheimring	120,000	Hockenheim, Germany	120,000	Motor racing	
58	EuroSpeedway Lausitz	120,000	Oberspreewald-Lausitz, Germany	120,000	Motor racing	
59	Circuit de Valencia	120,000	Cheste, Spain	120,000	Motor racing	
60	Mangueirão	120,000	Belém, Brazil	45,007	Association football	
61	Silesian Stadium	120,000	Chorzów, Poland	47,246	Association football, Motorcycle speedway	
62	Circuit de Nevers Magny-Cours	120,000	Magny-Cours, France	120,000	Motor racing	
63	Hungaroring	120,000	Mogyoród, Hungary	120,000	Motor racing	
64	El Cilindro	120,000	Avellaneda, Argentina	55,000	Association football	
65	Epsom Downs Racecourse	120,000	Epsom, England	10,875	Horse racing	
66	Autódromo José Carlos Pace	119,000	São Paulo, Brazil	119,000	Motor racing	
67	Ibrox Stadium	118,567	Glasgow, Scotland	51,700	Association football	
68	Castelão	118,496	Fortaleza, Brazil	64,846	Association football	
69	Los Angeles Memorial Coliseum	115,300	Los Angeles, California, United States	92,000	American football and Baseball	USC_vs_University_of_Oregon_November_2019
70	Michigan Stadium	115,109	Ann Arbor, Michigan, United States	107,601	American football	
71	Stadium Australia	114,714	Sydney, Australia	84,000	Rugby League, association football, Rugby Union, Australian rules football, cricket	
72	Salpausselkä	114,082	Lahti, Finland	80,000	Ski jumping	
73	Richmond International Raceway	112,029	Richmond, Virginia, United States	112,029	Motor racing	
74	Beaver Stadium	110,889	State College, Pennsylvania, United States	107,282	American football	
75	Kyle Field	110,633	College Station, Texas, United States	102,512	American football	
76	Ohio Stadium	110,045	Columbus, Ohio, United States	104,944	American football	
77	Olympiastadion	110,000	Berlin, Germany	74,228	Football	
78	Neyland Stadium	109,061	Knoxville, Tennessee, United States	100,011	American football	
79	AT&T Stadium	108,713	Arlington, Texas, United States	80,000	American football	
80	Kentucky Speedway	107,000	Sparta, Kentucky, United States	107,000	Motor racing	
81	Rose Bowl	106,869	Pasadena, California, United States	92,542	American football	
82	Estádio Beira-Rio	106,554	Porto Alegre, Brazil	51,300	Association football	
83	New Hampshire Motor Speedway	105,491	Loudon, New Hampshire, United States	93,521	Motor racing	
84	Stadium Puskás Ferenc	104,000	Budapest, Hungary	68,976	Association football	
85	Murrayfield Stadium	104,000	Edinburgh, Scotland	67,144	Rugby	
86	Luzhniki Stadium	103,000	Moscow, Russia	84,745	Association football	
87	Gottlieb-Daimler-Stadion	103,000	Stuttgart, Germany	58,000	Association football	
88	Odsal Stadium	102,569	Bradford, England	27,491	Rugby league	
89	Tiger Stadium	102,315	Baton Rouge, Louisiana, United States	102,000	American football	
90	Darrell K Royal–Texas Memorial Stadium	102,315	Austin, Texas, United States	100,119	American football	
90	Sonoma Raceway	102,000	Sonoma, California, United States	102,000	Motor racing	
91	Olimpiysky National Sports Complex	102,000	Kyiv, Ukraine	83,450	Association football	
92	Stade 5 Juillet 1962	102,000	Algiers, Algeria	66,000	Association football	
93	Bryant–Denny Stadium	101,821	Tuscaloosa, Alabama, United States	101,821	American football	
94	Narendra Modi Stadium	101,566	Ahmedabad, India	132,000	Cricket	
95	Autodromo Nazionale di Monza	100,000	Monza, Italy	118,865	Motor racing	
96	Algarve International Circuit	100,000	Portimão, Portugal	100,000	Motor racing	
97	Seoul Olympic Stadium	100,000	Seoul, South Korea	69,950	Association football	
98	Jawaharlal Nehru Stadium	100,000	Cochin, India	78,000	Association football	
99	Estadio Centenario	100,000	Montevideo, Uruguay	76,000	Association football	
100	Ellis Park Stadium	100,000	Johannesburg, South Africa	62,567	Rugby, association football	
101	Chang International Circuit	100,000	Buriram, Thailand	100,000	Motor racing	
102	Circuit Bugatti	100,000	Le Mans, France	100,000	Motor racing	
103	TT Circuit Assen	100,000	Assen, Netherlands	100,000	Motor racing	
104	Circuit Gilles Villeneuve	100,000	Montreal, Quebec, Canada	100,000	Motor racing	
105	Hipódromo de San Isidro	100,000	San Isidro, Argentina	100,000	Horse racing	
106	Stade des Martyrs	100,000	(Democratic Republic of the Congo) Kinshasa, DR Congo	80,000	Association football	
107	Goodwood Circuit	100,000	Chichester, England	100,000	Motor racing	

== Closed, proposed, and expanding venues ==
This list is for those venues that are currently closed, not in use, proposed, or are currently being expanded to 100,000 or more spectators.

Rank	Venue name	Highest capacity	Location	Use
1	Deutsches Stadion	400,000	Nuremberg, Germany	Proposed, never opened
2	Strahov Stadium	240,000	Prague, Czech Republic	Association football, never reached full capacity
3	Buddh International Circuit	200,000	Greater Noida, India	Motor racing (Current Capacity 120,000)
4	Ontario Motor Speedway	155,000	(United States) Ontario, California	Motor racing
5	Aintree Motor Racing Circuit	150,000	Aintree, England	Motor racing
6	Balatonring	140,000	Sávoly, Hungary	Motor racing (opening in TBD)
7	Estádio da Luz (1954)	135,000	Lisbon, Portugal	Association football
8	Wembley Stadium (1923)	127,000	London, England	Association football
9	West Ham Stadium	120,000	London, England	Association football, greyhound racing, speedway
10	Brookside Stadium	115,000	Cleveland, United States	American football, baseball
11	John F. Kennedy Stadium	102,000	Philadelphia, Pennsylvania, United States	American football
12	Hippodrome of Constantinople	100,000	Istanbul, Turkey	Chariot and Horse racing
13	Kirov Stadium	100,000	Saint Petersburg, Russia	Association football
14	Tower Athletic Grounds	100,000	New Brighton, England	Association football
15	10th-Anniversary Stadium	100,000	Warsaw, Poland	Association football
16	Zentralstadion	100,000	Leipzig, Germany	Association football
17	Estádio Olímpico Monumental	100,000	Porto Alegre, Brazil	Association football
18	New Trafford Stadium	100,000	Manchester, England	Association football, Proposed

== See also ==
- Lists of stadiums
