= List of stadiums in Europe =

The following is a list of stadiums in Europe.

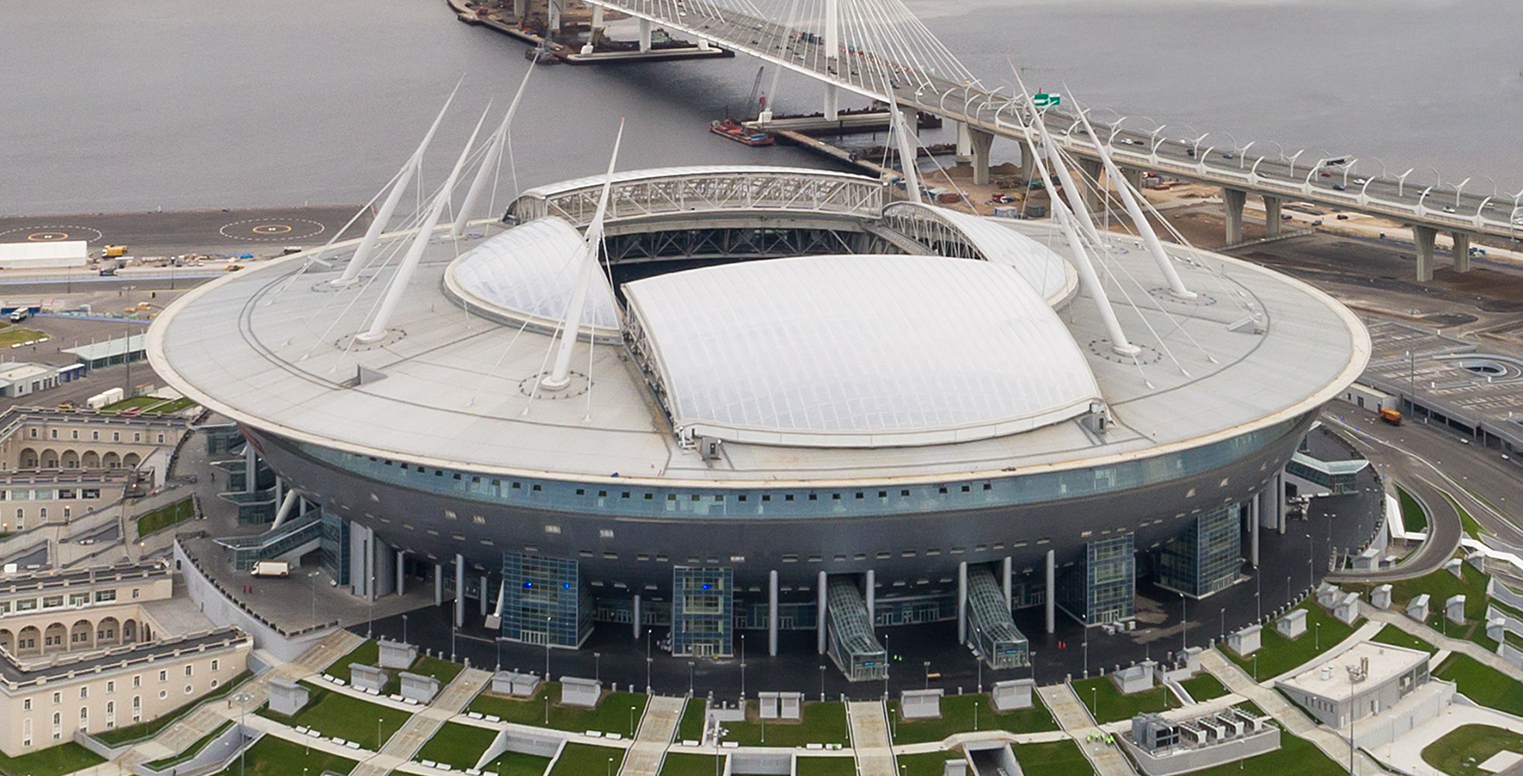
The Gazprom Arena, the home of FC Zenit.

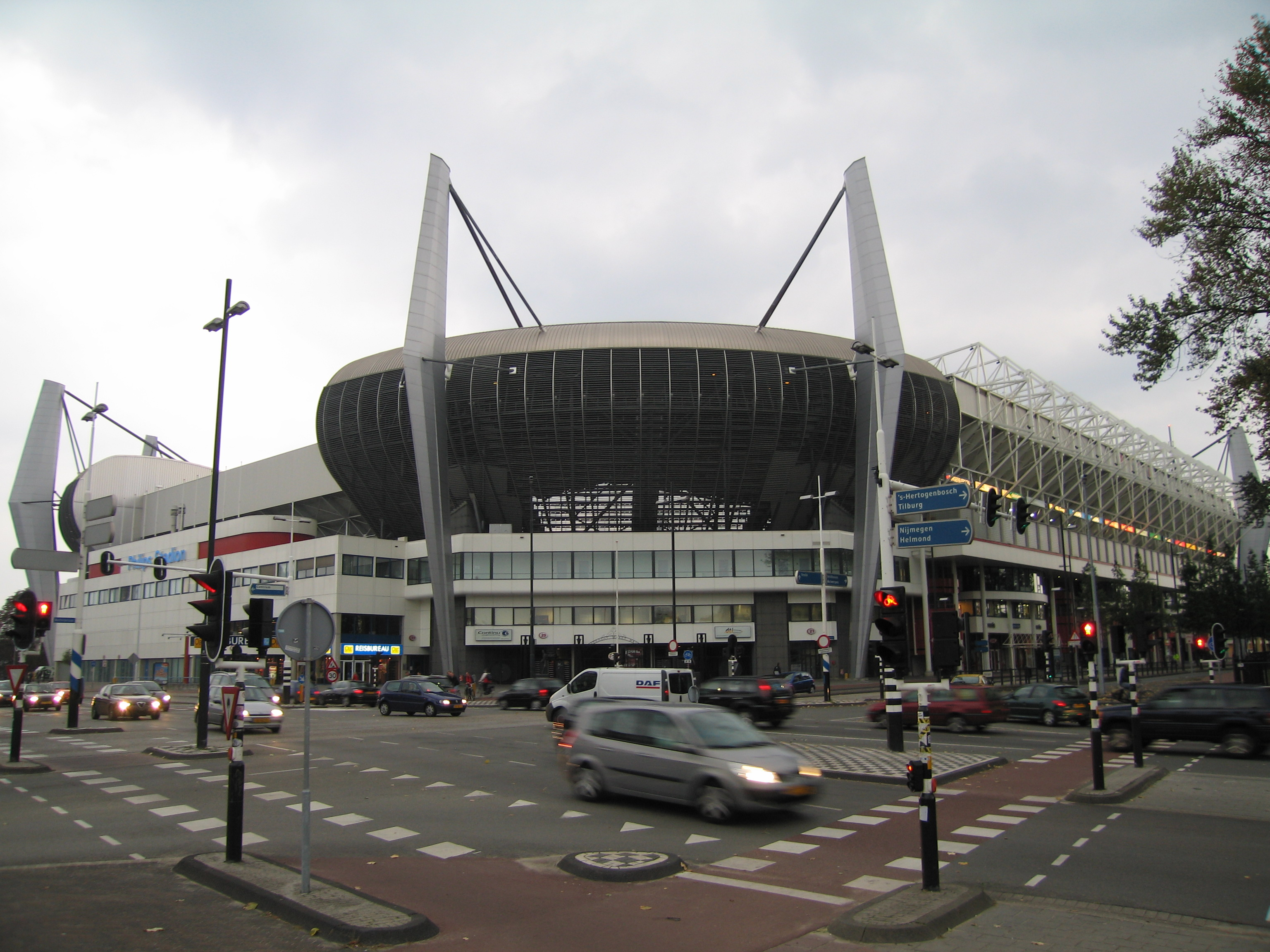
The Philips Stadion, the home of PSV from Eindhoven, a Dutch football club.

== List ==
=== Albania ===
- Abdurrahman Roza Haxhiu Stadium – Lushnjë
- Adush Muça Stadium – Ballsh
- Arena Kombëtare – Tirana
- Besa Stadium – Kavajë
- Brian Filipi Stadium – Lezhë
- Elbasan Arena – Elbasan
- Ersekë Stadium – Ersekë
- Flamurtari Stadium – Vlorë
- Kamëz Stadium – Kamëz
- Kastrioti Stadium – Krujë
- Laçi Stadium – Laç
- Liri Ballabani Stadium – Burrel
- Loni Papuçiu Stadium – Fier
- Loro Boriçi Stadium – Shkodër
- Luz i Vogël Stadium – Luz i Vogël
- Niko Dovana Stadium – Durrës
- Peqin Stadium – Peqin
- Qemal Stafa Stadium – Tirana
- Selman Stërmasi Stadium – Tirana
- Skënderbeu Stadium – Korçë
- Subi Bakiri Stadium – Gjirokastër
- Tomori Stadium – Berat
- Zeqir Ymeri Stadium – Kukës

=== Andorra ===
- Estadi Comunal d'Aixovall – Aixovall
- Estadi Comunal d'Andorra la Vella – Andorra la Vella
- Estadi Nacional – Andorra la Vella

=== Armenia ===
- Abovyan City Stadium – Abovyan
- Dilijan City Stadium – Dilijan
- Gyumri City Stadium – Gyumri
- Hrazdan Stadium – Yerevan
- Mika Stadium – Yerevan
- Urartu Stadium – Yerevan
- Vanadzor City Stadium – Vanadzor
- Vazgen Sargsyan Republican Stadium – Yerevan

=== Austria ===
- Ernst-Happel-Stadion – Vienna
- Fill Metallbau Stadion – Ried im Innkreis
- Gerhard Hanappi Stadium – Vienna
- Hypo-Arena – Klagenfurt
- Red Bull Arena – Salzburg
- Tivoli-Neu – Innsbruck
- UPC-Arena – Graz

=== Belarus ===
- Barysaŭ-Arena – Barysaŭ
- ASK Brescki – Brest
- Centraĺny Stadium – Homieĺ
- Dynama Stadium – Minsk
- CSK Nioman – Hrodna
- Spartak Stadium – Mahilioŭ
- Traktar Stadium – Minsk
- Viciebski CSK – Viciebsk

=== Belgium ===
- Albertpark – Ostend
- Bosuilstadion – Antwerp
- Constant Vanden Stock Stadium – Anderlecht
- Cristal Arena – Genk
- Daknamstadion – Lokeren
- Edmond Machtens Stadium – Molenbeek
- Freethiel Stadion – Beveren
- Guldensporen Stadion – Kortrijk
- Herman Vanderpoortenstadion – Lier
- Het Kuipje – Westerlo
- Jan Breydel Stadium – Bruges
- Jules Ottenstadion – Ghent
- King Baudouin Stadium – Brussels
- Olympisch Stadion – Antwerp
- Oscar Vankesbeeck Stadion – Mechlin
- Schiervelde Stadion – Roeselare
- Staaienveld – Sint-Truiden
- Stade Charles Tondreau – Mons
- Stade du Pays de Charleroi – Charleroi
- Stade du Tivoli – La Louvière
- Stade Le Canonnier – Mouscron
- Stade Maurice Dufrasne – Liège

=== Bosnia and Herzegovina ===
- Bijeli Brijeg Stadium – Mostar
- Bilino Polje – Zenica
- Koševo Stadium – Sarajevo
- East Sarajevo – East Sarajevo
- Stadion Grbavica – Sarajevo
- Gradski stadion (Orašje) – Orašje
- Stadion Otoka – Sarajevo
- Gradski stadion – Laktaši
- Maxima Stadium – Modriča
- Mokri Dolac Stadium – Posušje
- Stadion Pecara – Široki Brijeg
- Stadion Pirota – Travnik
- Pod Boricima Stadion – Bihać
- Police Stadium – Trebinje
- Stadion Tušanj – Tuzla
- Vrapčići Stadium – Mostar
- Gradski stadion – Žepče
- Gradski stadion – Bijeljina

=== Bulgaria ===
- Balgarska Armiya Stadium – Sofia
- Beroe Stadium – Stara Zagora
- Georgi Asparuhov Stadium – Sofia
- Gradski Stadium – Ruse
- Stadium Hristo Botev – Blagoevgrad
- Hristo Botev Stadium – Gabrovo
- Hristo Botev Stadium – Plovdiv
- Hristo Botev Stadium – Vratza
- Lokomotiv Stadium – Plovdiv
- Lokomotiv Stadium – Sofia
- Lovech Stadium – Lovech
- Naftex Stadium – Bourgas
- New Varna Stadium – Varna
- Panayot Volov Stadium – Shumen
- Plovdiv Stadium – Plovdiv
- Rakovski Stadium – Sevlievo
- Slavia Stadium – Sofia
- Septemvri Stadium – Sofia
- Spartak Stadium – Pleven
- Spartak Stadium – Sandanski
- Spartak Stadium – Varna
- Ticha Stadium – Varna
- Vasil Levski National Stadium – Sofia
- Yuri Gagarin Stadium – Varna

=== Croatia ===
- Gradski stadion u Koprivnici – Koprivnica
- Gradski stadion u Sinju – Sinj
- Gradski stadion u Sisku – Sisak
- Stadion Varteks – Varaždin
- Stadion Gradski vrt – Osijek
- Opus Arena –Osijek
- Stadion Hitrec-Kacian – Zagreb
- Stadion Kantrida – Rijeka
- Stadion Kranjčevićeva – Zagreb
- Stadion Maksimir – Zagreb
- Stadion Park mladeži – Split
- Stadion Poljud – Split
- Stadion Rujevica – Rijeka
- Stadion Stanovi – Zadar
- Stadion Stari plac – Split
- Stadion Šubićevac – Šibenik
- Stadion Velika Gorica – Velika Gorica

=== Cyprus ===
- Ammochostos Stadium – Larnaca
- Antonis Papadopoulos Stadium – Larnaca
- Ethnikos Achna Stadium – Achna
- Geroskipou stadium – Geroskipou
- GSP Stadium – Nicosia
- GSZ Stadium – Larnaca
- Makario Stadium – Nicosia
- Pafiako Stadium – Paphos
- Peyia Municipal Stadium – Peyia
- Tasos Markou Stadium – Paralimni
- Tsirion Stadium – Limassol

=== Czech Republic ===
- Bazaly – Ostrava
- Eden Arena (formerly Synot Tip Arena) – Prague
- Generali Arena – Prague
- Městský fotbalový stadion Miroslava Valenty – Uherské Hradiště
- Stadion Evžena Rošického – Prague
- Stadion Juliska – Prague
- Stadion Za Lužánkami – Brno
- Strahov Stadium – Prague

=== Denmark ===
- Atletion – Århus
- Blue Water Arena – Esbjerg
- Brøndby Stadium – Brøndby
- CASA Arena Horsens – Horsens
- Energi Nord Arena – Aalborg
- Farum Park – Farum
- Haderslev Fodboldstadion – Haderslev
- MCH Arena – Herning
- Parken Stadium – Copenhagen
- Silkeborg Stadion – Silkeborg
- TRE-FOR Park – Odense
- Viborg Stadion – Viborg

=== Estonia ===
- A. Le Coq Arena – Tallinn
- Kadrioru Stadium – Tallinn
- Kalevi Keskstaadion – Tallinn
- Pärnu Kalevi Stadium – Pärnu
- Rakvere Stadium – Rakvere
- Tamme Stadium – Tartu

=== Faroe Islands ===
- Gundadalur – Tórshavn
- Svangaskarð – Toftir
- Tórsvøllur – Tórshavn

=== Finland ===
- Helsinki Olympic Stadium – Helsinki
- Hietalahti Stadium – Vaasa
- Ratina Stadion – Tampere
- Salpausselkä skiing stadium – Lahti
- Sonera Stadium – Helsinki
- Veritas Stadion – Turku

=== France ===
- Allianz Riviera – Nice
- Amable-et-Micheline-Lozai Stadium – Le Petit-Quevilly
- Circuit de la Sarthe – Le Mans
- MMArena – Le Mans
- Parc des Princes – Paris
- Stade Chaban-Delmas – Bordeaux
- Stade de France – Saint-Denis, metro Paris
- Stade de Gerland – Lyon
- Stade de la Beaujoire – Nantes
- Stade de la Meinau – Strasbourg
- Stade de la Mosson – Montpellier
- Stade de l'Abbé-Deschamps – Auxerre
- Stade Félix-Bollaert – Lens
- Stade Pierre-Mauroy – Lille
- Stade Roland Garros – Paris
- Stade Saint-Symphorien – Metz
- Stade Vélodrome – Marseille
- Stadium Municipal – Toulouse
- Stadium Nord Lille Métropole – Lille

=== Germany ===
- Allianz Arena – Munich
- BayArena – Leverkusen
- Bielefelder Alm – Bielefeld
- Borussia-Park – Mönchengladbach
- Coface Arena – Mainz
- Deutsche Bank Park – Frankfurt
- DKB-Arena – Rostock
- Dreisamstadion – Freiburg
- Embdena-Stadion – Emden
- Energieteam Arena – Paderborn
- Esprit Arena – Düsseldorf
- Frankenstadion – Nuremberg
- Fritz-Walter-Stadion – Kaiserslautern
- Georg-Melches-Stadion – Essen
- Gerry Weber Stadion – Halle, NRW
- Grotenburg Stadion – Krefeld
- Grugastadion – Essen
- Heinz-von-Heiden-Arena – Hanover (Niedersachsenstadion)
- Hermann-Löns-Stadion – Paderborn
- Ludwigsparkstadion – Saarbrücken
- Mathias-Stinnes-Stadion – Essen
- MHPArena – Stuttgart
- Müngersdorfer Stadion – Cologne
- Nattenberg Stadion – Lüdenscheid
- Olympic Stadium – Berlin
- Olympic Stadium – Munich
- Osnatel-Arena – Osnabrück (Bremer Brücke)
- Red Bull Arena – Leipzig
- Rot-Weiss Tennis Club – Berlin
- Rothenbaum – Hamburg
- Rudolf-Harbig-Stadium – Dresden
- Ruhrstadion – Bochum
- Sportpark am Hallo – Essen
- Stadion am Bieberer Berg – Offenbach am Main
- Stadion am Bruchweg – Mainz
- Stadion der Freundschaft – Cottbus
- Südweststadion – Ludwigshafen am Rhein
- Uhlenkrugstadion – Essen
- Veltins-Arena – Gelsenkirchen (Arena AufSchalke)
- Volksparkstadion – Hamburg
- Volkswagen Arena – Wolfsburg
- Weserstadion – Bremen
- Westfalenstadion – Dortmund
- Wildparkstadion – Karlsruhe

=== Gibraltar ===
- Victoria Stadium – Gibraltar

=== Greece ===
- Agia Sophia Stadium – Athens
- Kaftanzoglio Stadium – Thessaloniki
- Karaiskaki Stadium – Piraeus
- Nea Smyrni Stadium – Athens
- Olympic Baseball Centre – Athens
- Olympic Hockey Centre – Athens
- Olympic Softball Stadium – Athens
- Kleanthis Vikelides Stadium – Thessaloniki
- Olympic Stadium – Athens
- Olympic Tennis Centre – Athens
- Olympic Velodrome – Athens
- Panathinaiko Stadium – Athens
- Pankritiko Stadium – Heraklion
- Panpeloponnesian Stadium – Patras
- Panthessalian Stadium – Volos
- Toumba Stadium – Thessaloniki

=== Hungary ===
- Bozsik Aréna – Budapest
- Diósgyőri Stadion – Miskolc
- ETO Park – Győr
- Fehérvári úti Stadion – Paks
- Groupama Aréna – Budapest
- Haladás Sportkomplexum – Szombathely
- Hidegkuti Nándor Stadion – Budapest
- MOL Aréna Sóstó – Székesfehérvár
- Nagyerdei Stadion – Debrecen
- Pancho Aréna – Felcsút
- Puskás Aréna – Budapest
- Szusza Ferenc Stadium – Budapest
- ZTE Aréna – Zalaegerszeg

=== Iceland ===
- Akranesvöllur – Akranes
- Akureyrarvöllur – Akureyri
- Fylkisvöllur – Reykjavík
- Hásteinsvöllur – Vestmannæyjar
- Kaplakrikavöllur – Hafnarfjörður
- Keflavíkurvöllur – Keflavík
- Kópavogsvöllur – Kópavogur
- KR-völlur – Reykjavík
- Laugardalsvöllur – Reykjavík

=== Ireland ===
- Breffni Park – Cavan
- Carlisle Grounds – Bray
- Croke Park – Dublin
- Dalymount Park – Dublin
- Donnybrook Stadium – Dublin
- Eamonn Deacy Park – Galway
- Ferrycarrig Park – Wexford
- Finn Park – Ballybofey
- Fitzgerald Stadium – Killarney
- Gaelic Grounds – Limerick
- Galway Sportsgrounds – Galway
- Kilcully – Cork
- Jackman Park – Limerick
- Lansdowne Road – Dublin
- MacHale Park – Castlebar
- Morton Stadium – Dublin
- Musgrave Park – Cork
- Nowlan Park – Kilkenny
- O'Moore Park – Portlaoise
- Oriel Park – Dundalk
- Páirc Uí Chaoimh – Cork
- Páirc Uí Rinn – Cork
- Parnell Park – Dublin
- Pearse Stadium – Galway
- RDS Arena – Dublin
- Richmond Park – Dublin
- Semple Stadium – Thurles
- Station Road – Newbridge, County Kildare
- St Colman's Park – Cobh
- Strokestown Road – Longford
- Thomond Park – Limerick
- Tolka Park – Dublin
- Turners Cross – Cork
- UCD Bowl – Dublin
- United Park – Drogheda
- Waterford Regional Sports Centre – Waterford

=== Italy ===
- Arena Civica, also known as Arena Napoleonica – Milan
- Colosseum (disused) – Rome
- Foro Italico – Rome
- Juventus Stadium – Turin
- San Siro, also known as the Stadio Giuseppe Meazza – Milan
- Stadio Artemio Franchi – Florence
- Stadio Atleti Azzurri d'Italia – Bergamo
- Stadio Brianteo – Monza
- Stadio Città di Arezzo (formerly Stadio Comunale) – Arezzo
- Stadio Danilo Martelli – Mantua
- Stadio della Vittoria – Bari
- Stadio delle Alpi – Turin
- Stadio Ezio Scida – Crotone
- Stadio Flaminio – Rome
- Stadio Friuli – Udine
- Stadio Luigi Ferraris – Genoa
- Stadio Marc'Antonio Bentegodi – Verona
- Stadio Mario Rigamonti – Brescia
- Stadio Olimpico – Rome
- Stadio Olimpico di Torino – Turin
- Stadio Renato Dall'Ara – Bologna
- Stadio Renzo Barbera – Palermo
- Stadio San Filippo – Messina
- Stadio San Nicola – Bari
- Stadio San Paolo – Naples
- Stadio Sant'Elia – Cagliari
- Stadio Via del Mare – Lecce
- Velodromo Vigorelli – Milan

=== Jersey ===
- Springfield Stadium – St. Helier

=== Kosovo ===
- Fadil Vokrri Stadium – Pristina
- Adem Jashari Olympic Stadium – Mitrovica
- Zahir Pajaziti Stadium – Podujevë

=== Latvia ===
- Skonto Stadium – Riga
- Daugava Stadium – Liepāja
- Ventspils Olimpiskais Stadions – Ventspils
- Olympic Sports Center of Zemgale – Jelgava
- Celtnieks Stadium – Daugavpils
- Daugava Stadium – Daugavpils

=== Liechtenstein ===
- Rheinpark Stadion – Vaduz

=== Lithuania ===
- Aukštaitija Stadium – Panevėžys
- Lithuania National Stadium – Vilnius
- S. Darius and S. Girėnas Stadium – Kaunas
- Vėtra Stadium – Vilnius
- Žalgiris Stadium – Vilnius
- Žalgiris Stadium – Klaipėda

=== Luxembourg ===
- Stade de Luxembourg – Luxembourg City

=== North Macedonia ===
- Philip II Arena – Skopje
- Stadion Tumbe Kafe – Bitola
- Gradski stadion Tetovo – Tetovo

=== Malta ===
- Ta' Qali National Stadium – Ta' Qali

=== Moldova ===
- Sheriff Stadium – Tiraspol
- Stadionul Constructorul – Chişinău
- Stadionul Moldova – Chişinău
- Stadionul Republican – Chişinău
- Zimbru Stadium – Chişinău

=== Monaco ===
- Monte Carlo Country Club – Monte Carlo
- Stade Louis II – Fontvieille

=== Montenegro ===
- Gradski Stadion – Berane
- Gradski Stadion – Nikšić
- Podgorica City Stadium – Podgorica
- Stadion Pod Malim Brdom – Petrovac

=== Netherlands ===
- 711 Stadion – Velsen
- Abe Lenstra Stadion – Heerenveen
- AFAS Stadion – Alkmaar
- Bingoal Stadion – The Hague
- Cambuurstadion – Leeuwarden
- Covebo Stadion – De Koel – Venlo
- De Adelaarshorst – Deventer
- De Grolsch Veste – Enschede
- De Oude Meerdijk – Emmen
- Erve Asito – Almelo
- Euroborg – Groningen
- Fortuna Sittard Stadion – Sittard
- Frans Heesenstadion – Oss
- GelreDome – Arnhem
- Goffertstadion – Nijmegen
- GS Staalwerken Stadion – Helmond
- Jan Louwers Stadion – Eindhoven
- Johan Cruijff ArenA – Amsterdam
- Koning Willem II Stadion – Tilburg
- Kras Stadion – Volendam
- MAC³PARK stadion – Zwolle
- Mandemakers Stadion – Waalwijk
- Matchoholic Stadion – Dordrecht
- Parkstad Limburg Stadion – Kerkrade
- Philips Stadion – Eindhoven
- Rat Verlegh Stadion – Breda
- Sparta-Stadion – Rotterdam
- Stadion De Geusselt – Maastricht
- Stadion De Vijverberg – Doetinchem
- Stadion De Vliert – 's-Hertogenbosch
- Stadion Feijenoord – Rotterdam
- Stadion Galgenwaard – Utrecht
- Van Donge & De Roo Stadion – Rotterdam
- Yanmar Stadion – Almere

=== Cyprus ===
- GSE Stadium – Famagusta
- Zafer Stadı – Güzelyurt

=== Norway ===
- Aker Stadion – Molde
- Alfheim stadion – Tromsø
- Åråsen Stadion – Lillestrøm
- Aspmyra Stadion – Bodø
- Bislett Stadion – Oslo
- Brann Stadion – Bergen
- Briskeby Arena – Hamar
- Bryne Stadion – Bryne
- Color Line Stadion – Ålesund
- Fredrikstad Stadium – Fredrikstad
- Holmenkollen ski jump – Oslo
- Lerkendal Stadion – Trondheim
- Lysgårdsbakken – Lillehammer
- Marienlyst Stadion – Drammen
- Melløs Stadion – Moss
- Nadderud stadion – Bekkestua
- Skagerak Arena – Skien
- Sør Arena – Kristiansand
- Storstadion – Sandefjord
- Ullevaal Stadion – Oslo
- Viking Stadion – Stavanger

=== Poland ===
- ArcelorMittal Park – Sosnowiec
- Arena Lublin – Lublin
- Chorten Arena – Białystok
- Enea Stadion – Poznań
- Ernest Pohl Stadium – Zabrze
- Grzegorz Lato Stadium – Mielec
- Exbud Arena – Kielce
- Florian Krygier Stadium - Szczecin
- Henryk Reyman Stadium – Kraków
- KGHM Zagłębie Arena – Lubin
- Marshal Józef Piłsudski Stadium – Kraków
- Orlen Stadion - Płock
- PGE Narodowy – Warsaw
- Piotr Wieczorek Stadium – Gliwice
- Polish Army Stadium – Warsaw
- Polsat Plus Arena Gdańsk – Gdańsk
- Silesian Stadium – Chorzów
- Stadion BBOSiR – Bielsko-Biała
- Stadion GOSiR – Gdynia
- Tarczyński Arena – Wrocław
- Tychy Stadium – Tychy
- Widzew Stadium – Łódź
- Władysław Król Stadium – Łódź

=== Portugal ===
- Estádio Algarve – between Faro and Loulé
- Estádio Cidade de Barcelos – Barcelos
- Estádio Cidade de Coimbra – Coimbra
- Estádio da Luz – Lisbon
- Estádio de São Miguel, Ponta Delgada
- Estádio do Bessa XXI – Porto
- Estádio do Bonfim – Setúbal
- Estádio do Dragão – Porto
- Estádio do Restelo – Lisbon
- Estádio do Marítimo – Funchal
- Estádio D. Afonso Henriques – Guimarães
- Estádio José Alvalade – Lisbon
- Estádio Dr. Magalhães Pessoa – Leiria
- Estádio Municipal de Águeda – Águeda
- Estádio Municipal de Aveiro – Aveiro
- Estádio Municipal de Braga – Braga
- Estádio Nacional – Oeiras
- Estádio 1º de Maio – Braga
- Estádio Municipal Dr. José Vieira de Carvalho – Maia
- Estoril Court Central – Oeiras
- Autódromo do Algarve – Portimão

=== Romania ===
- Arena Națională – Bucharest
- Stadionul Dinamo – Bucharest
- Stadionul Giuleşti-Valentin Stănescu – Bucharest
- Stadionul Steaua – Bucharest
- Stadionul Cetate – Alba Iulia
- Stadionul Francisc von Neumann – Arad
- Stadionul Municipal – Bacău
- Stadionul Municipal – Botoşani
- Stadionul Municipal – Braşov
- Stadionul Silviu Ploeşteanu – Braşov
- Stadionul Municipal – Brăila
- Stadionul Concordia – Chiajna
- Stadionul Dr. Constantin Rădulescu – Cluj-Napoca
- Cluj Arena – Cluj-Napoca
- Stadionul Ion Moina – Cluj-Napoca
- Stadionul Farul – Constanţa
- Stadionul Extensiv – Craiova
- Stadionul Ion Oblemenco – Craiova
- Stadionul Municipal – Drobeta-Turnu Severin
- Stadionul Marin Anastasovici – Giurgiu
- Stadionul Nicolae Rainea – Galaţi
- Stadionul Michael Klein – Hunedoara
- Stadionul Emil Alexandrescu – Iaşi
- Stadionul Iftimie Ilisei – Medgidia
- Stadionul Gaz Metan – Mediaş
- Stadionul Iuliu Bodola – Oradea
- Stadionul Viitorul – Ovidiu
- Stadionul Jiul – Petroşani
- Stadionul Ceahlăul – Piatra Neamţ
- Stadionul Nicolae Dobrin – Piteşti
- Stadionul Astra – Ploieşti
- Stadionul Ilie Oană – Ploieşti
- Stadionul Moldova – Roman
- Stadionul Olimpia – Satu Mare
- Stadionul Municipal – Sibiu
- Stadionul Areni – Suceava
- Stadionul Tudor Vladimirescu – Târgu Jiu
- Stadionul Trans-Sil – Târgu Mureş
- Stadionul Delta – Tulcea
- Stadionul Dan Păltinișanu – Timișoara
- Stadionul Anghel Iordănescu – Voluntari

=== Russia ===
- Akhmat-Arena – Grozny
- Anzhi Arena – Kaspiysk
- Arena CSKA – Moscow
- Arena Khimki – Khimki
- Arsenal Stadium – Tula
- Central Dynamo Stadium – Moscow
- Central Stadium – Astrakhan
- Central Stadium – Kazan
- Central Stadium – Volgograd
- Dynamo Stadium – Moscow
- Eduard Streltsov Stadium – Moscow
- Fisht Olympic Stadium – Sochi
- Kazan Arena – Kazan
- Khazar Stadion – Makhachkala
- Khimik Stadion – Kemerovo
- Krasnodar Stadium – Krasnodar
- Krestovsky Stadium – St. Petersburg
- Kuban Stadium – Krasnodar
- Lokomotiv Stadium – Moscow
- Luzhniki Stadium – Moscow
- Metallurg Stadion – Samara
- Olimp-2 – Rostov-on-Don
- Otkrytiye Arena – Moscow
- Petrovsky Stadium – St. Petersburg
- Republikan Spartak Stadion – Vladikavkaz
- SKA SKVO Stadion – Rostov-on-Don
- Tsentralnyi Profsoyuz Stadion – Voronezh

=== San Marino ===
- Stadio Olimpico – Serravalle

=== Serbia ===
- Rajko Mitić stadium – Belgrade
- Partizan Stadium – Belgrade
- Omladinski Stadium – Belgrade
- Čair Stadium – Niš
- Smederevo Stadium – Smederevo
- Čika Dača Stadium – Kragujevac
- Karađorđe Stadium – Novi Sad
- Jagodina City Stadium – Jagodina
- Pirot Stadium – Pirot
- Subotica City Stadium – Subotica
- Železnik Stadium – Belgrade
- Užice City Stadium – Užice
- Novi Pazar City Stadium – Novi Pazar
- Čika Dača Stadium – Kragujevac
- Mladost Stadium – Kruševac
- Zemun Stadium – Belgrade
- City Stadium Šabac – Šabac
- Yumco Stadium – Vranje
- City Stadium Kikinda – Kikinda
- Čukarički Stadion – Belgrade
- King Peter I Stadium – Belgrade
- Detelinara Stadium – Novi Sad
- Hajduk Stadium – Kula
- Slavko Maletin Vava Stadium – Bačka Palanka
- Stadium next to Pyrite – Bor
- Metalac Stadium – Gornji Milanovac
- Ivanjica Stadium – Ivanjica

=== Slovakia ===
- Štadión Antona Malatinského – Trnava
- Tehelné Pole Stadion – Bratislava
- Vsesportový Areal – Košice

=== Slovenia ===
- Arena Petrol – Celje
- Bežigrad Stadium – Ljubljana
- Stožice Stadium – Ljubljana
- Ljudski vrt – Maribor
- Stadion Matije Gubca – Krško
- Bonifika Stadium – Koper

=== Spain ===
- Camp Nou – Barcelona
- El Molinón – Gijón
- Estadio Anoeta – San Sebastián
- Estadio Balaídos – Vigo
- Estadio Benito Villamarín – Seville
- Estadio Carlos Tartiere – Oviedo
- Estadio de la Cartuja – Seville
- Estadio Gran Canaria – Las Palmas
- Estadio José Rico Pérez – Alicante
- Estadio La Rosaleda – Málaga
- Estadi Olímpic Lluís Companys – Barcelona
- Estadio Martínez Valero – Elche
- Estadio Metropolitano – Madrid
- Estadio Nueva Condomina – Murcia
- Estadio Ramón Sánchez Pizjuán – Seville
- Estadio Riazor – A Coruña
- Estadio San Mamés – Bilbao
- Estadio Santiago Bernabéu – Madrid
- Estadi RCDE – Cornellà de Llobregat
- La Romareda – Zaragoza
- Mestalla – Valencia

=== Sweden ===
- Behrn Arena – Örebro
- Borås Arena – Borås
- Domnarvsvallen – Borlänge
- Fredriksskans – Kalmar
- Strawberry Arena – Solna, Stockholm
- Gamla Ullevi – Gothenburg
- Grimsta IP – Stockholm
- Guldfågeln Arena – Kalmar
- Idrottsparken – Norrköping
- Malmö Stadion – Malmö
- Norrporten Arena – Sundsvall
- Olympia – Helsingborg
- Örjans Vall – Halmstad
- Rambergsvallen – Gothenburg
- Råsunda Stadium – Solna, Stockholm
- Swedbank Park – Västerås
- Stadion – Malmö
- Söderstadion – Stockholm
- Södertälje Fotbollsarena – Södertälje
- Stadsparksvallen – Jönköping
- Starke Arvid Arena – Ljungskile
- 3Arena – Stockholm
- Stockholm Olympic Stadium – Stockholm
- Strömvallen – Gävle
- Ullevi – Gothenburg
- Vångavallen – Trelleborg
- Värendsvallen – Växjö

=== Switzerland ===
- Letzigrund – Zürich
- St. Jakob-Park – Basel
- Stade de Genève – Geneva
- Stade de Suisse, Wankdorf – Bern
- Stadion Zürich – Zürich

=== Turkey ===
- Atatürk Olympic Stadium – Istanbul
- Başakşehir Fatih Terim Stadium – Istanbul
- Beşiktaş Stadium – Istanbul
- Rams Park – Istanbul

=== Ukraine ===
- Avanhard Stadium – Luhansk
- Avanhard Stadium – Lutsk
- Avanhard Stadium – Uzhhorod
- Butovsky Vorskla Stadium – Poltava
- Central Stadium – Zaporizhia
- Chornomorets Stadium – Odesa
- Dnipro Arena – Dnipro
- Donbas Arena – Donetsk
- Volodymyr Boiko Stadium – Mariupol
- Lobanovsky Dynamo Stadium – Kyiv
- Lokomotiv Stadium – Simferopol
- MCS Rukh – Ivano-Frankivsk
- Metalist Stadium – Kharkiv
- Metalurh Stadium – Kryvyi Rih
- Olimpiysky National Sports Complex – Kyiv
- RSC Olimpiyskiy – Donetsk
- Tsentralnyi Stadion – Cherkasy
- Ukraina Stadium – Lviv
- Yuvileiny Stadium – Sumy

=== United Kingdom ===
==== Northern Ireland ====
- Brandywell Stadium – Derry
- Casement Park – Belfast
- Healy Park – Omagh
- The Oval – Belfast
- Ravenhill Stadium – Belfast
- Solitude – Belfast
- Windsor Park – Belfast

==== Scotland ====
- Murrayfield Stadium – Edinburgh
- Celtic Park – Glasgow
- Hampden Park – Glasgow
- Ibrox Stadium – Glasgow

==== Wales ====
- Cardiff Arms Park – Cardiff
- Cardiff City Stadium – Cardiff
- Liberty Stadium – Swansea
- Millennium Stadium – Cardiff
- Parc y Scarlets – Llanelli
- SWALEC Stadium – Cardiff

== Gallery ==
European stadiums

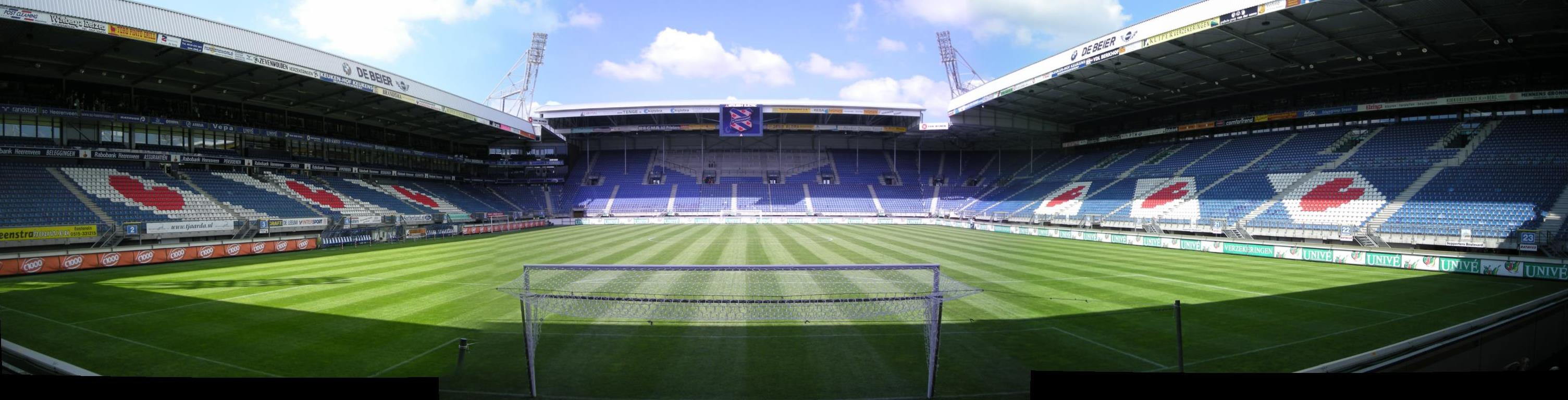
Abe Lenstra Stadion

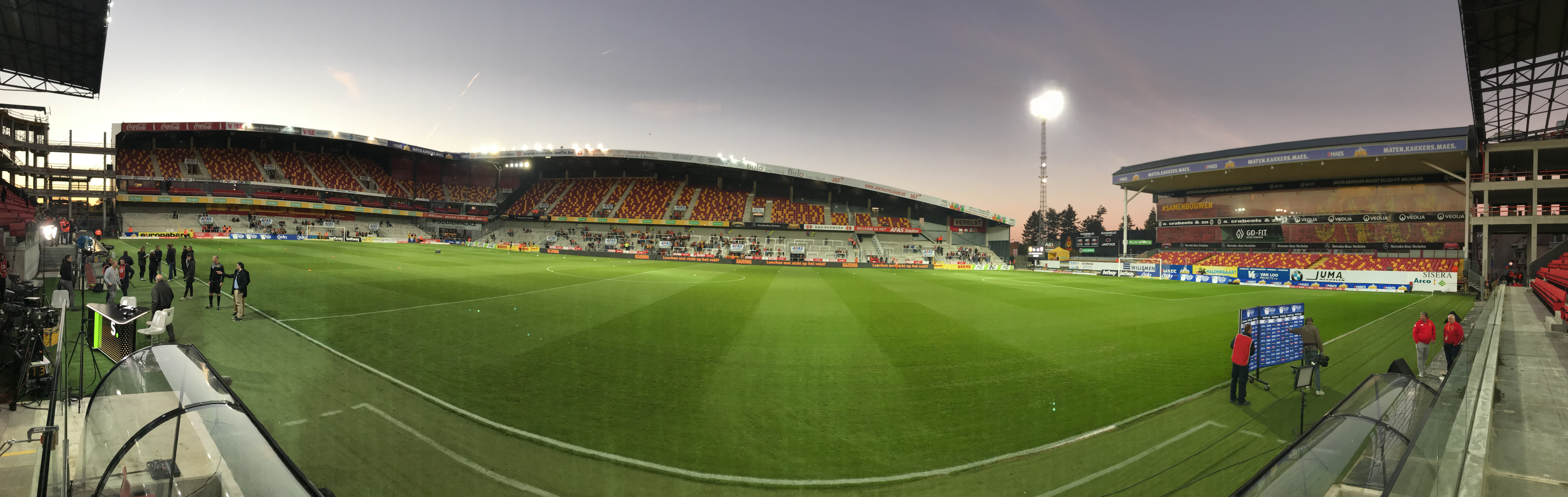
AFAS Stadion

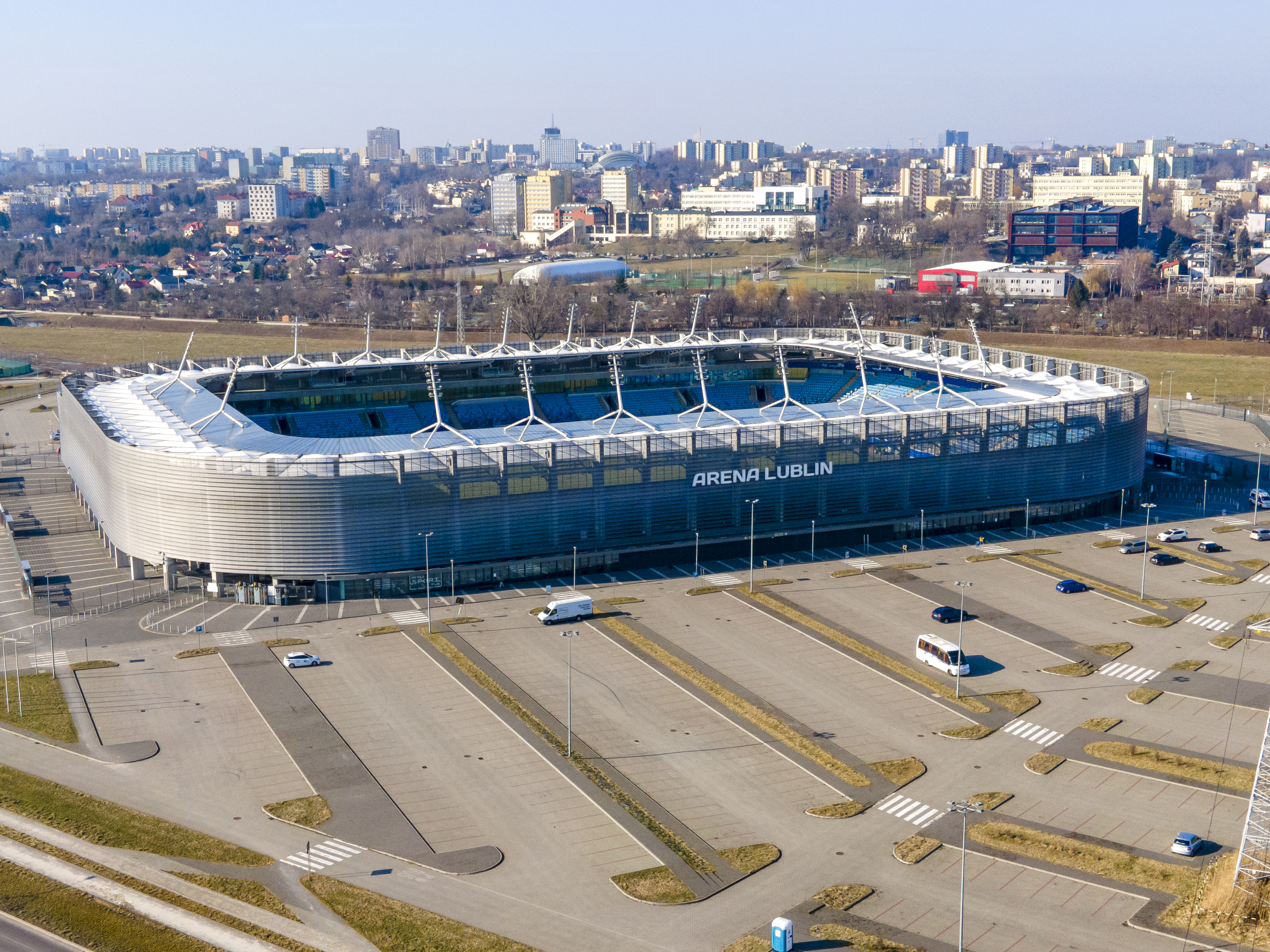
Arena Lublin

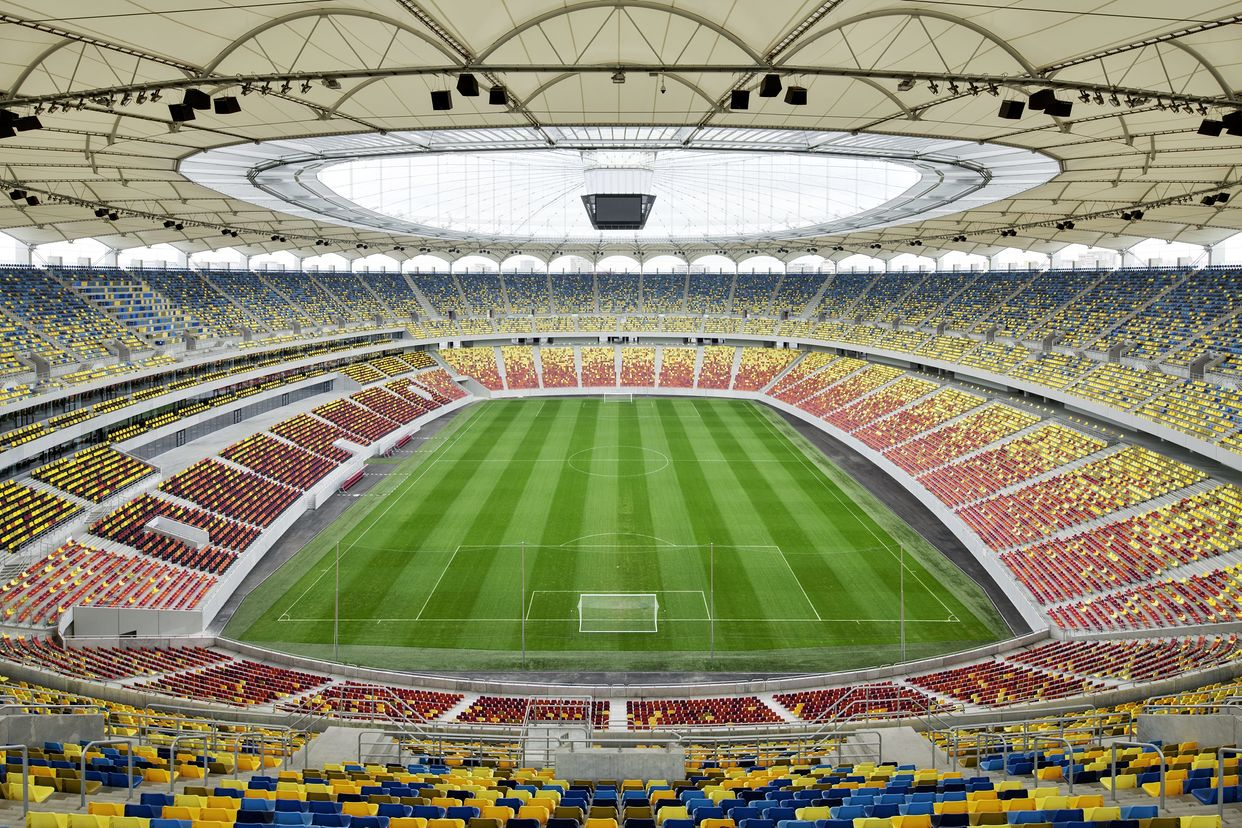
Arena Națională

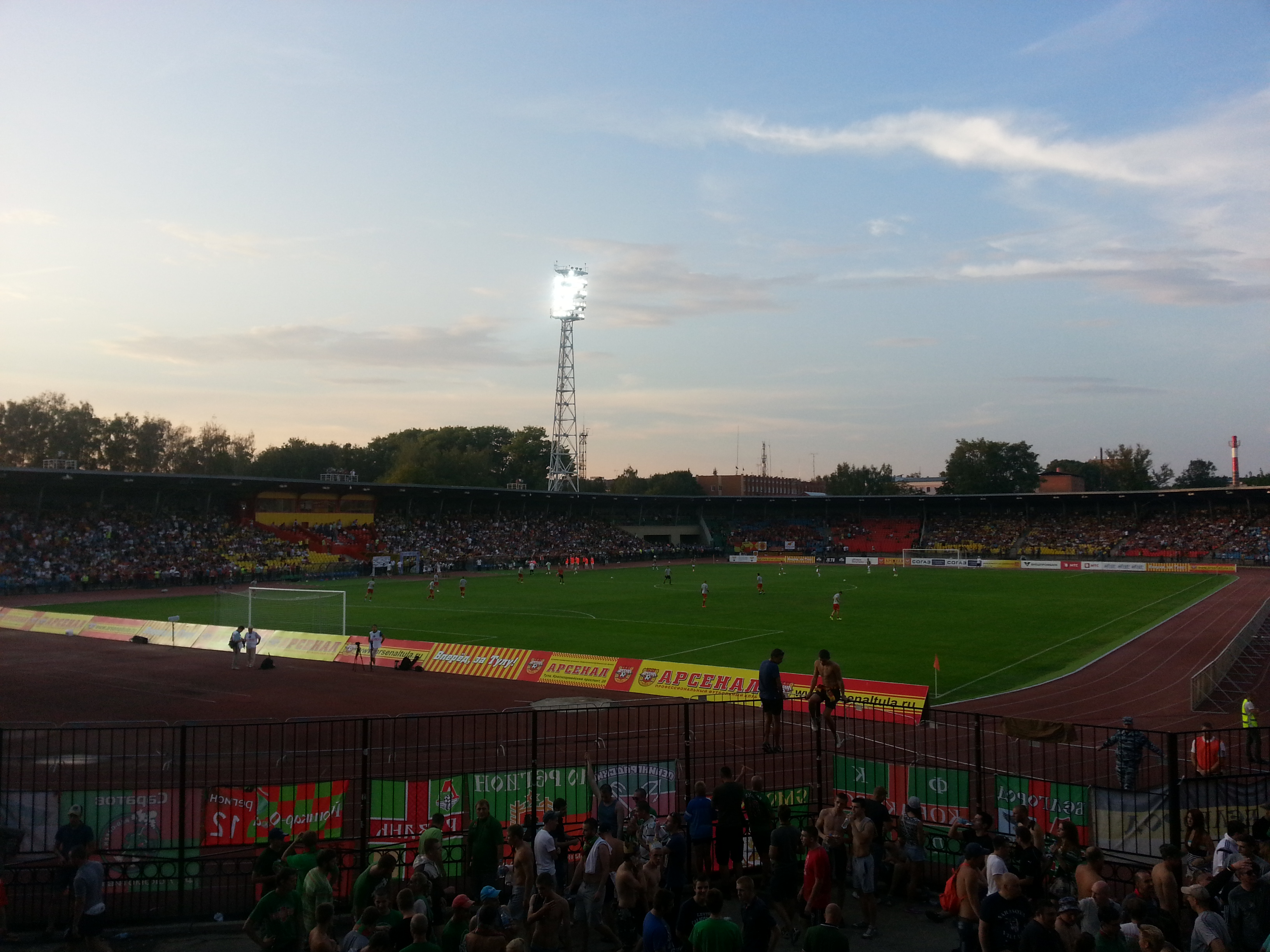
Arsenal Stadium

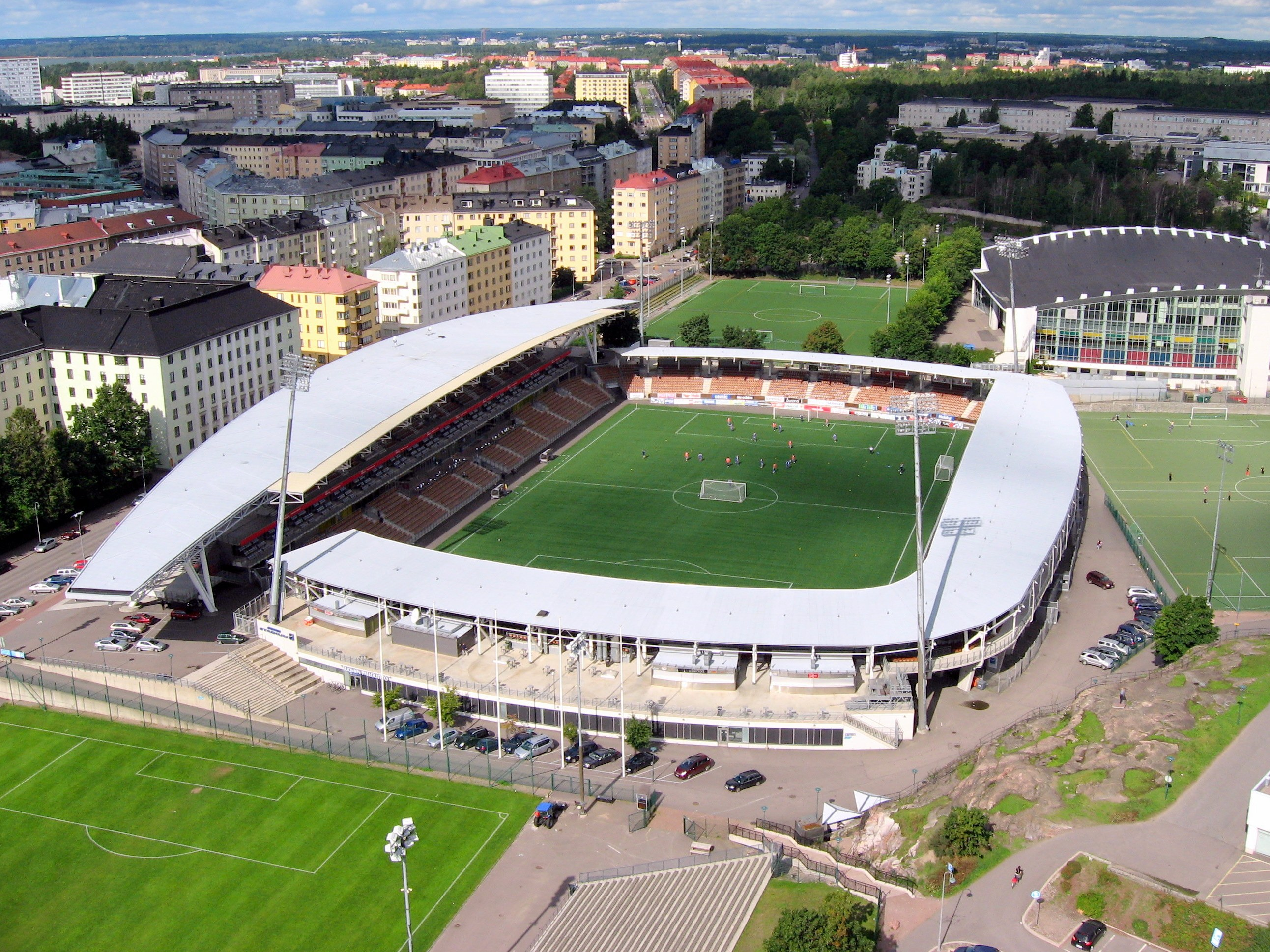
Bolt Arena

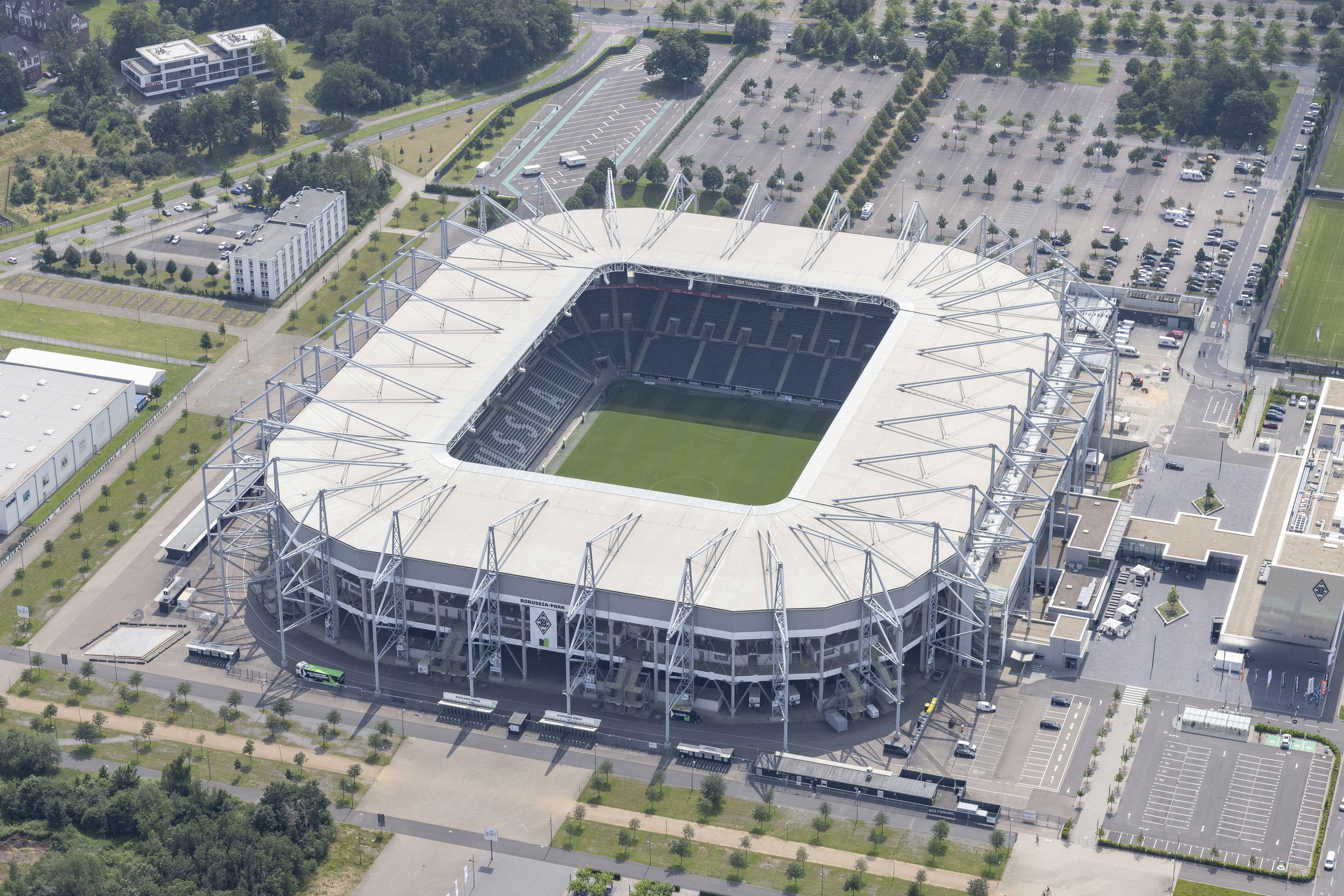
BORUSSIA-PARK

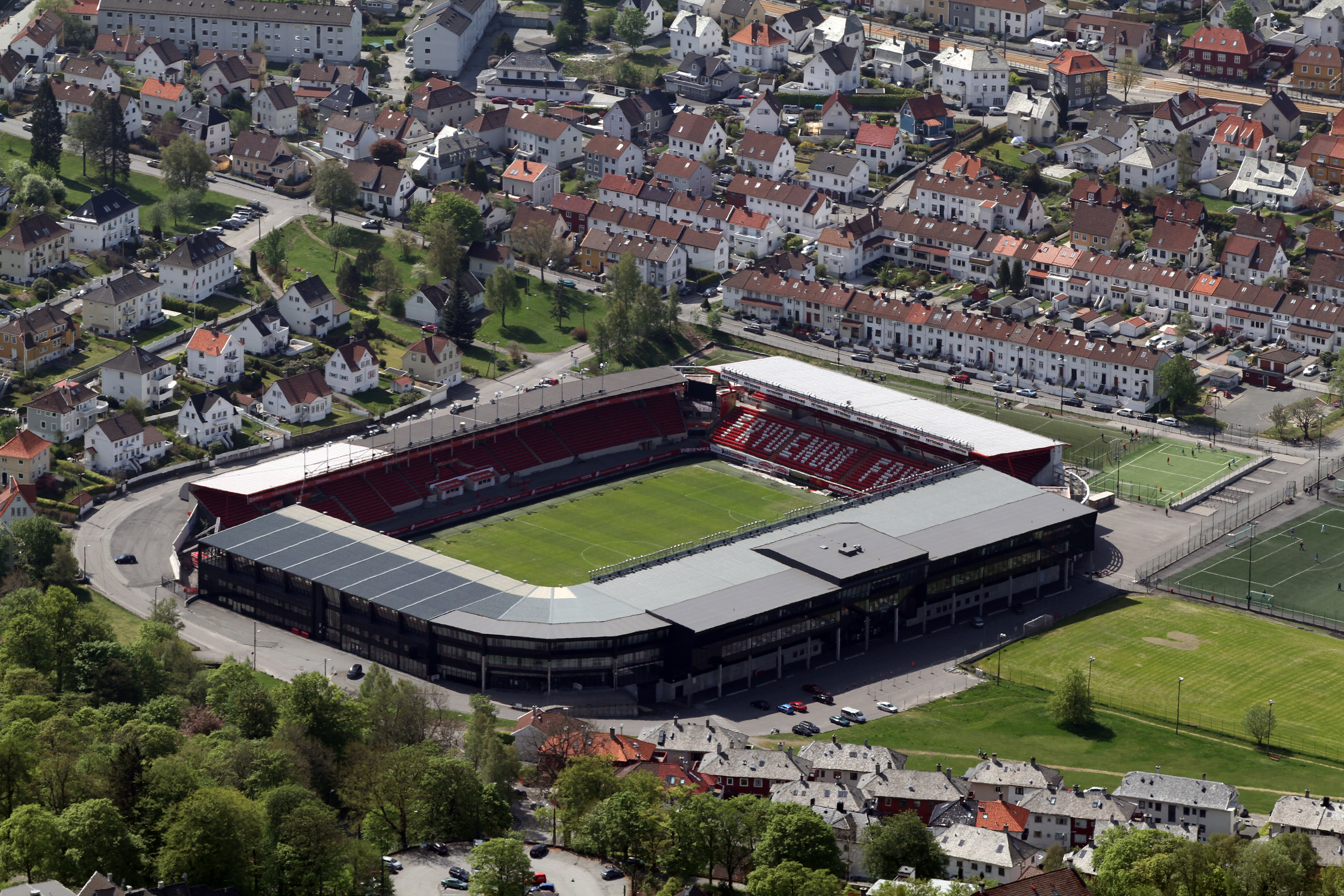
Brann stadion

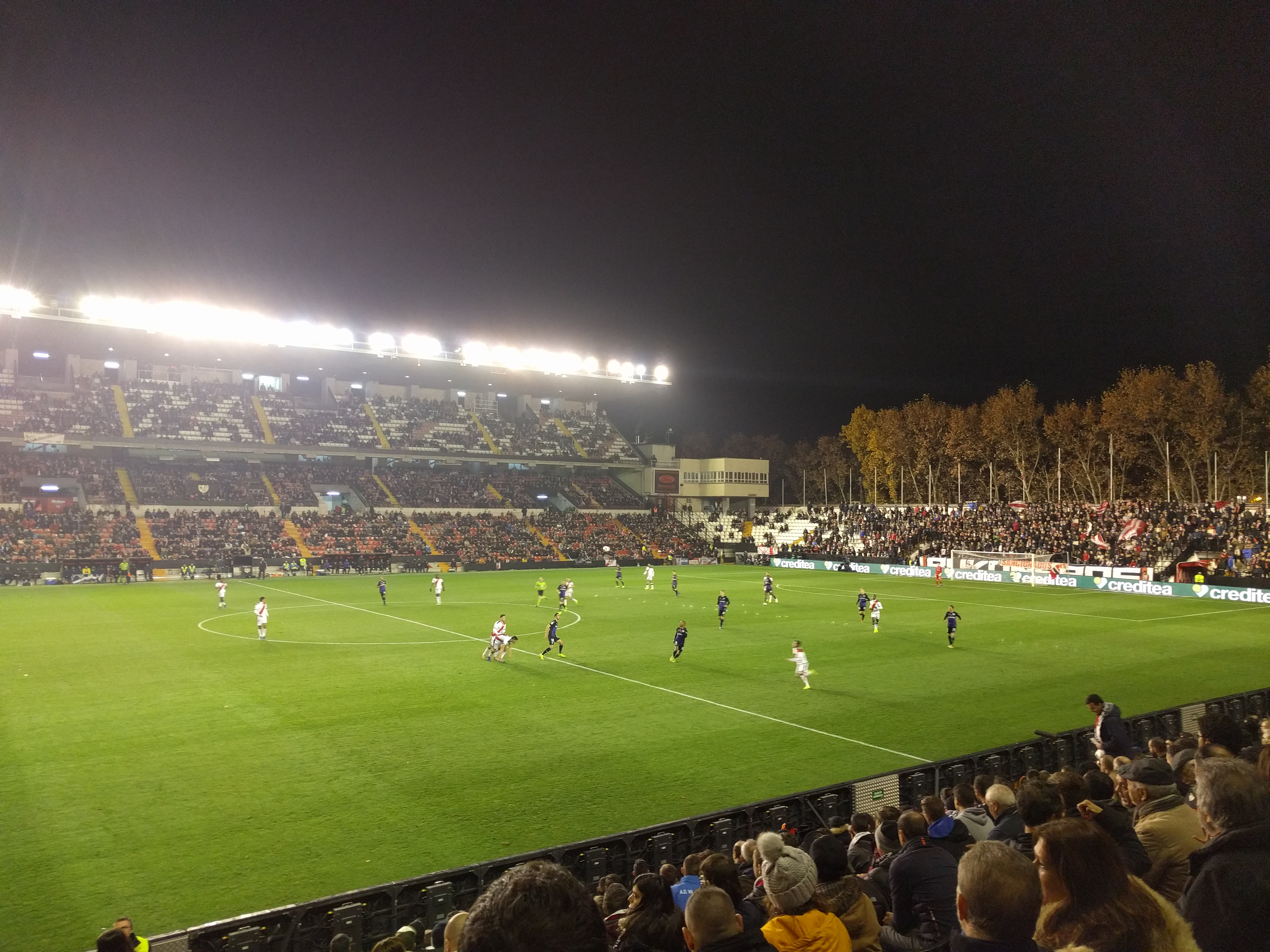
Campo de fútbol de Vallecas

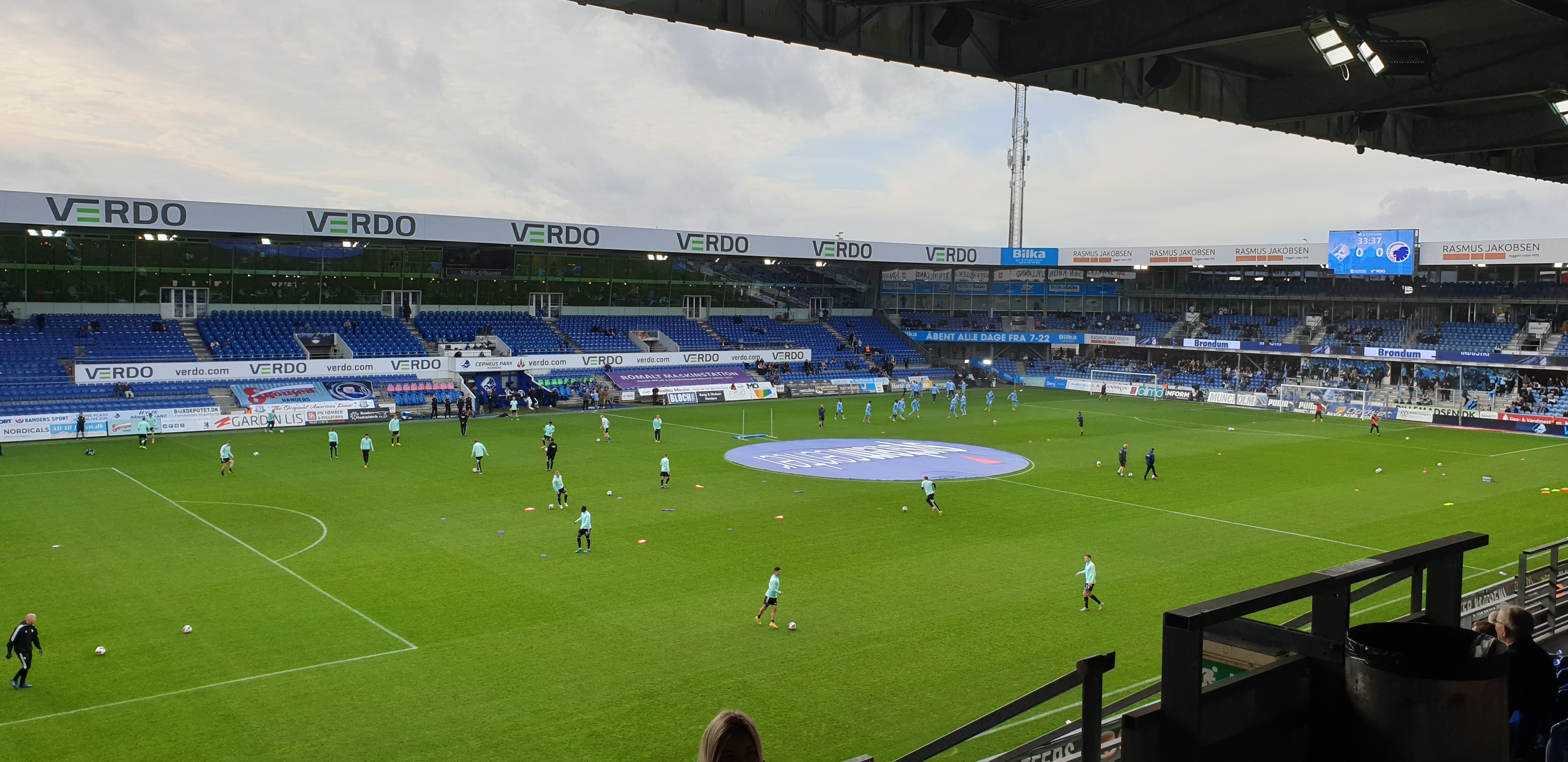
Cepheus Park Randers

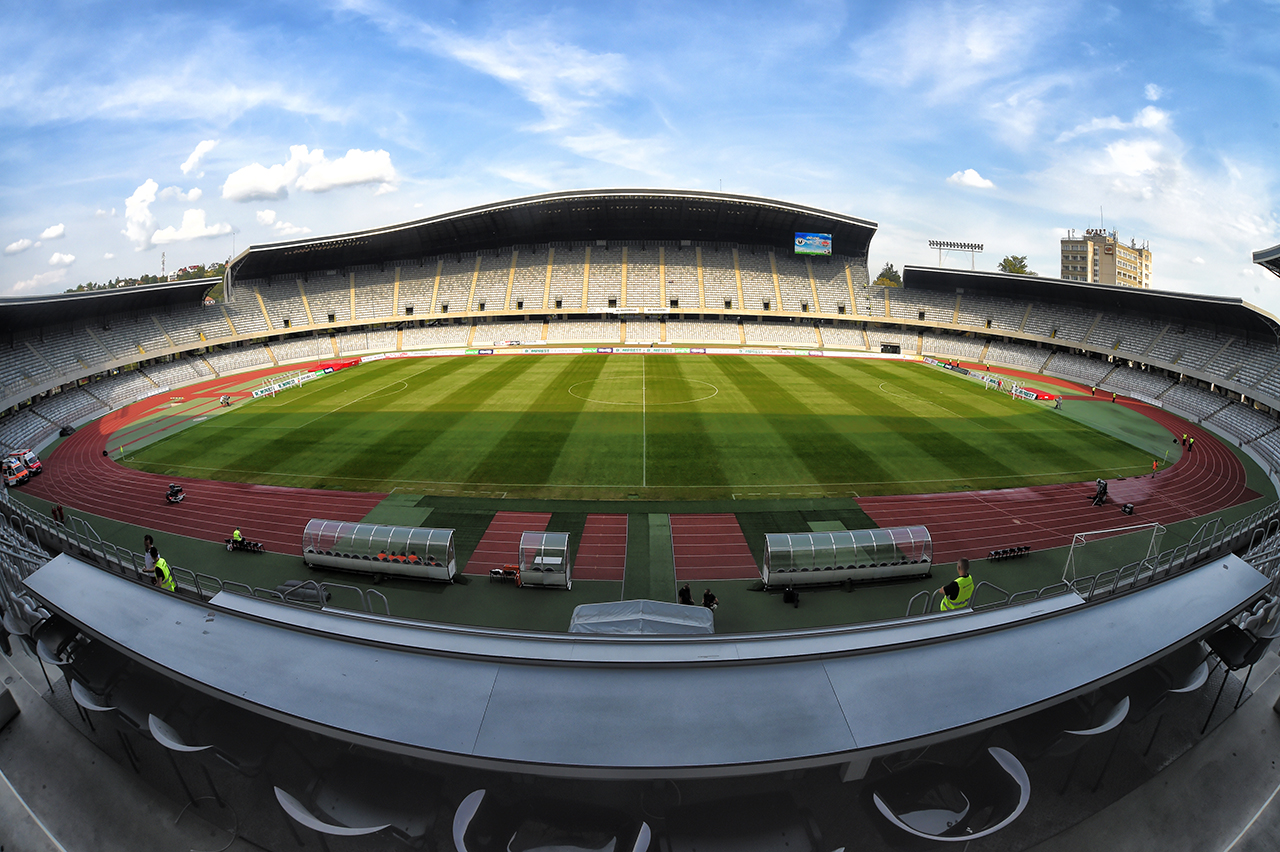
Cluj Arena

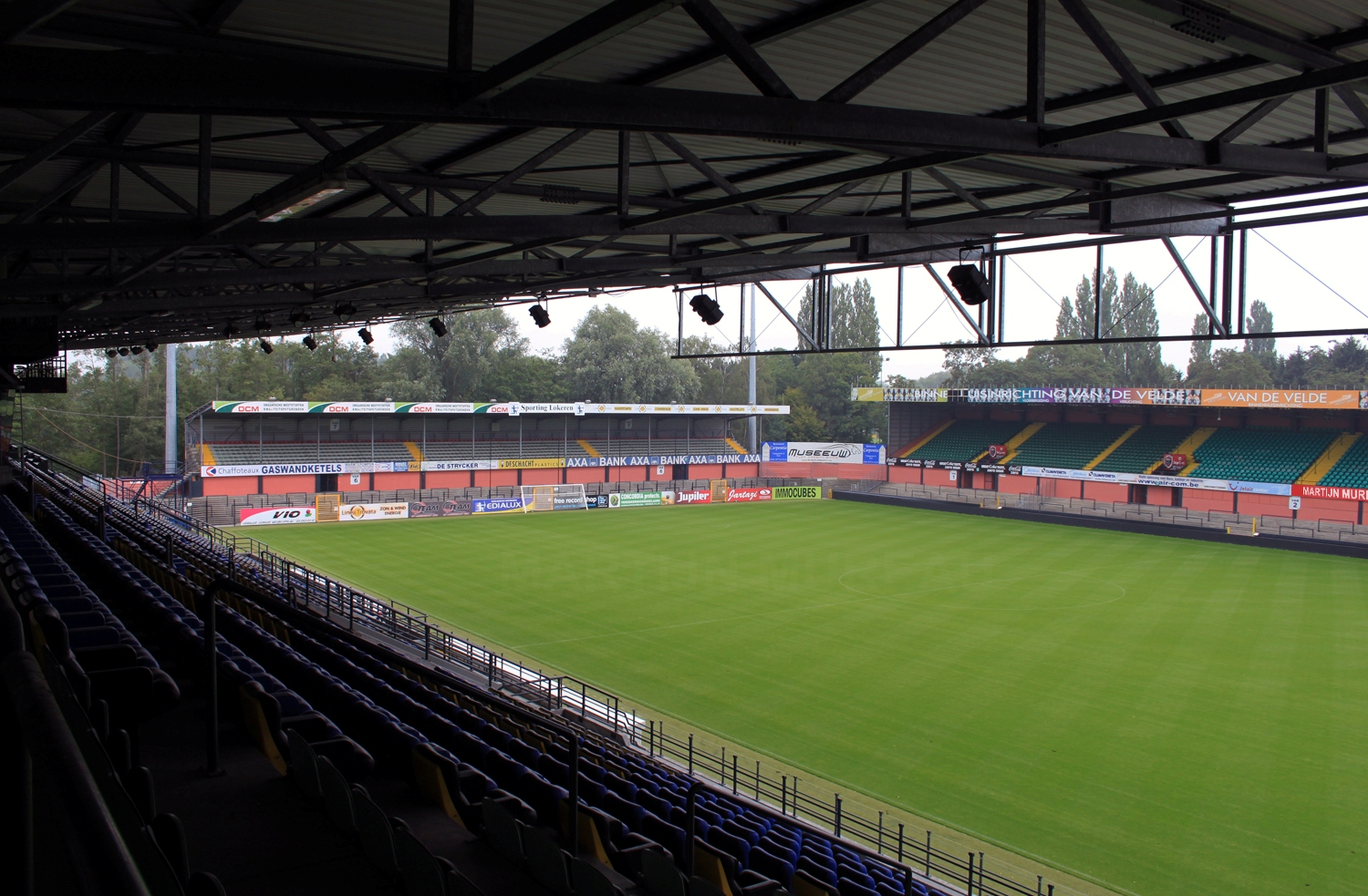
Daknamstadion

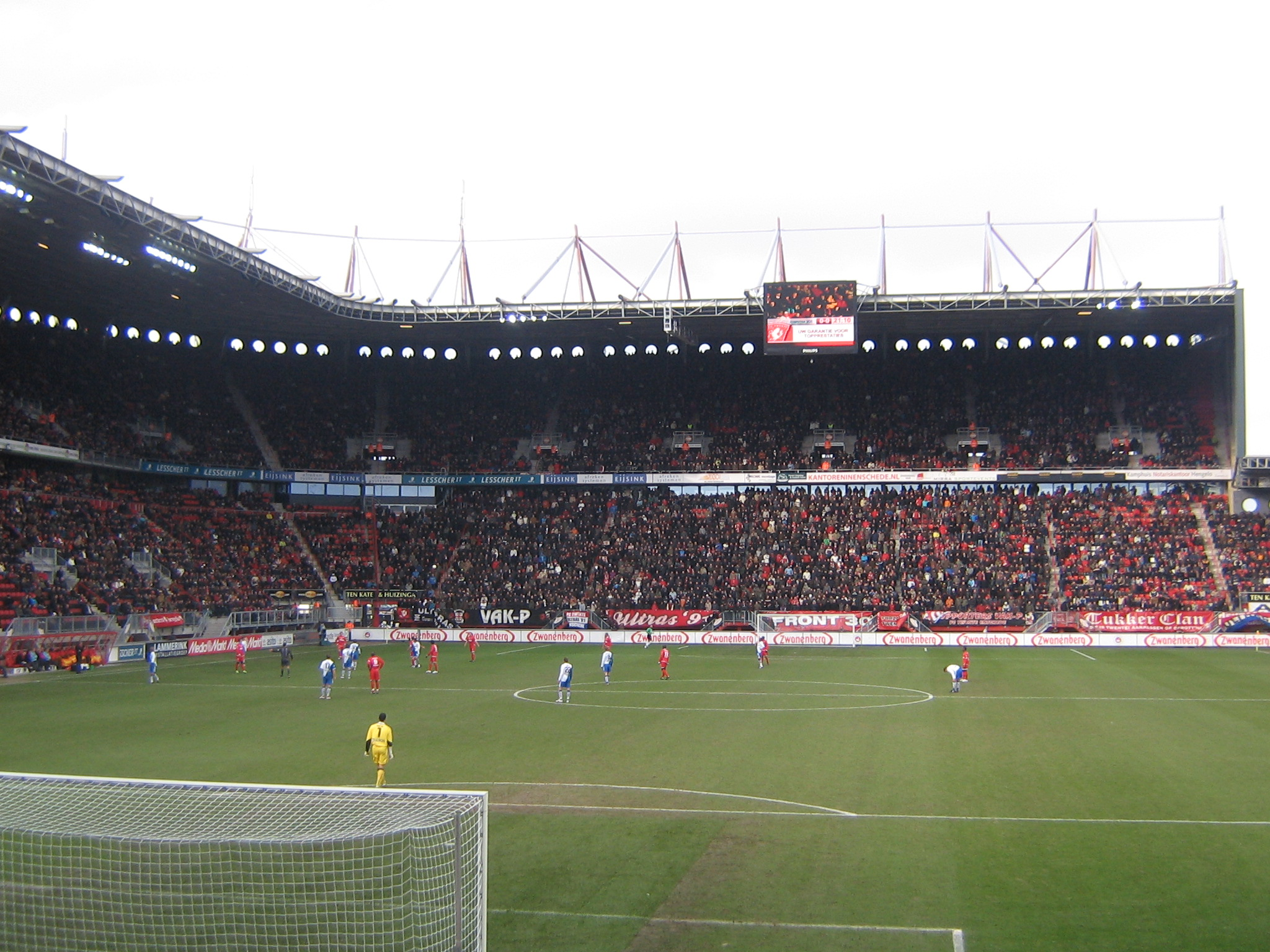
De Grolsch Veste

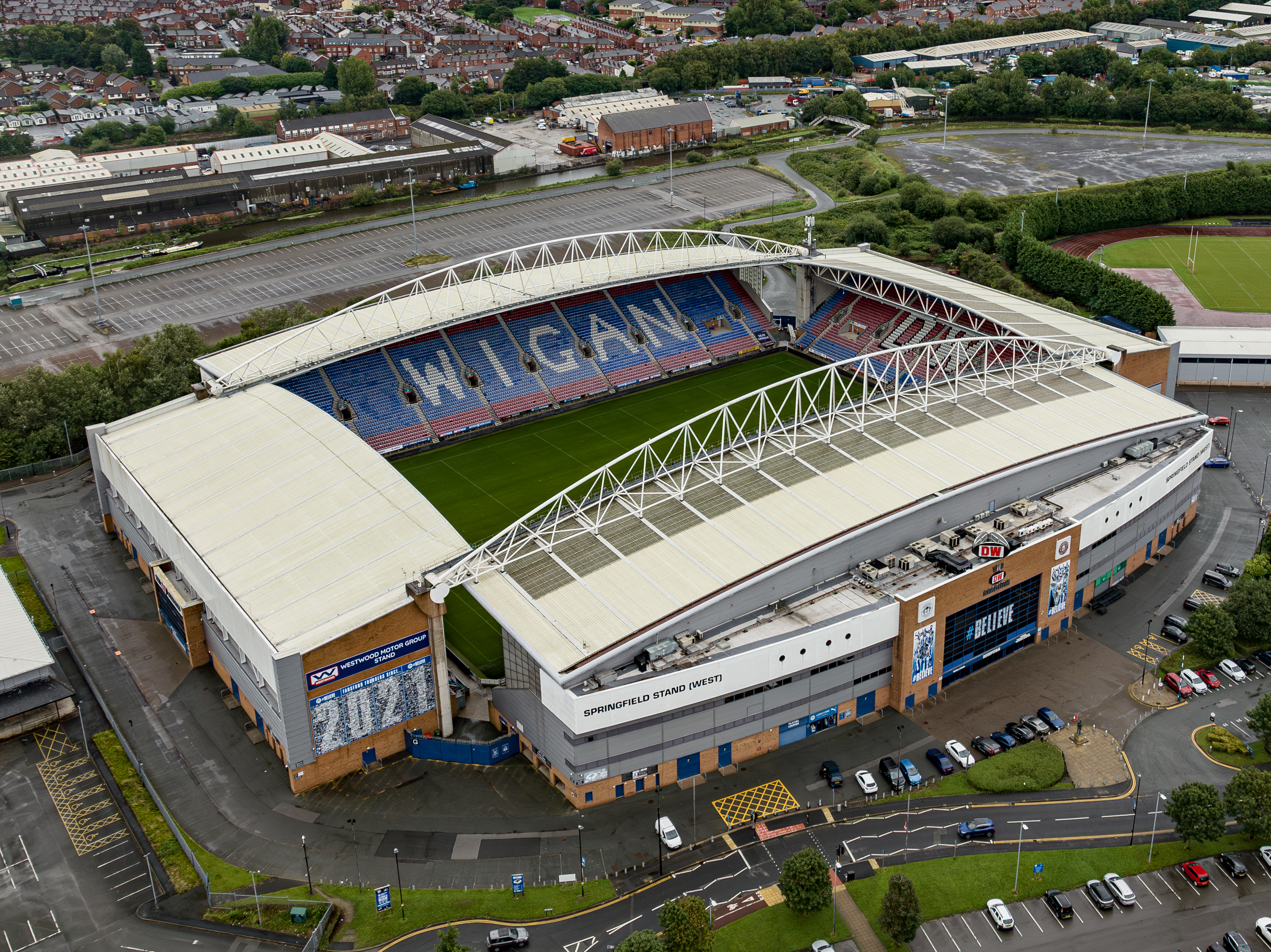
DW Stadium

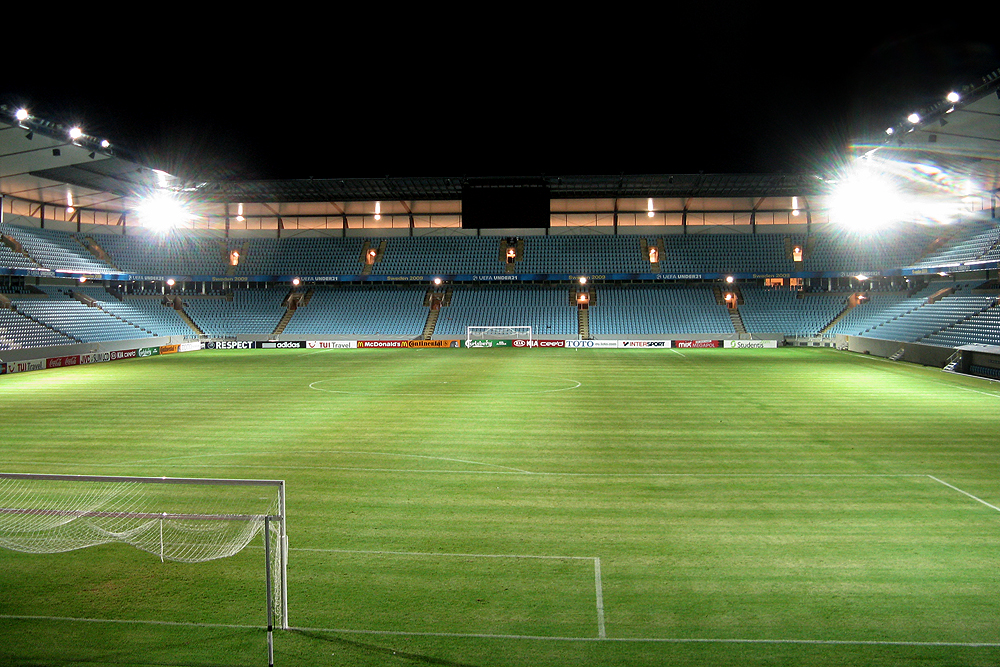
Eleda Stadion

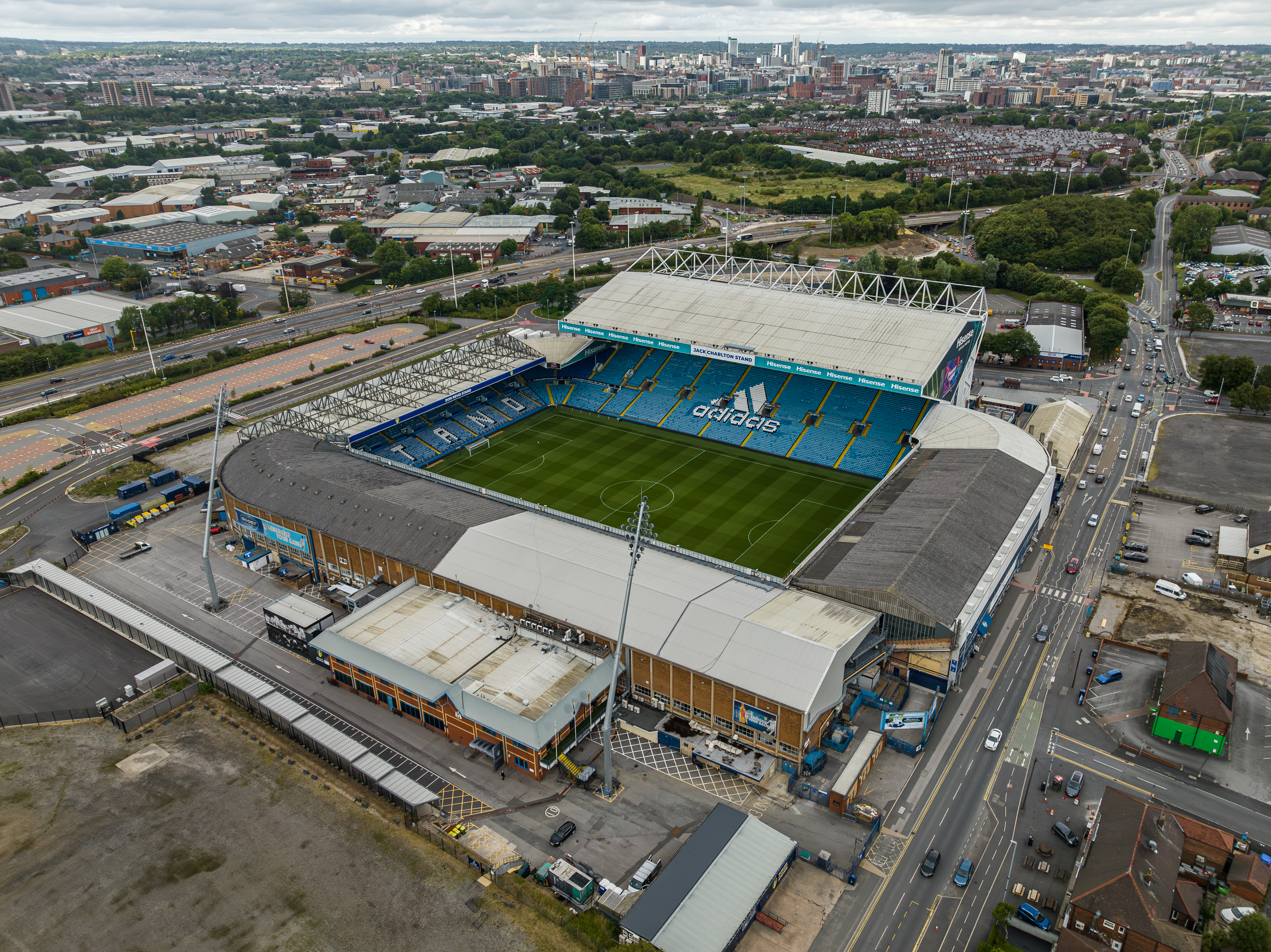
Elland Road Stadium

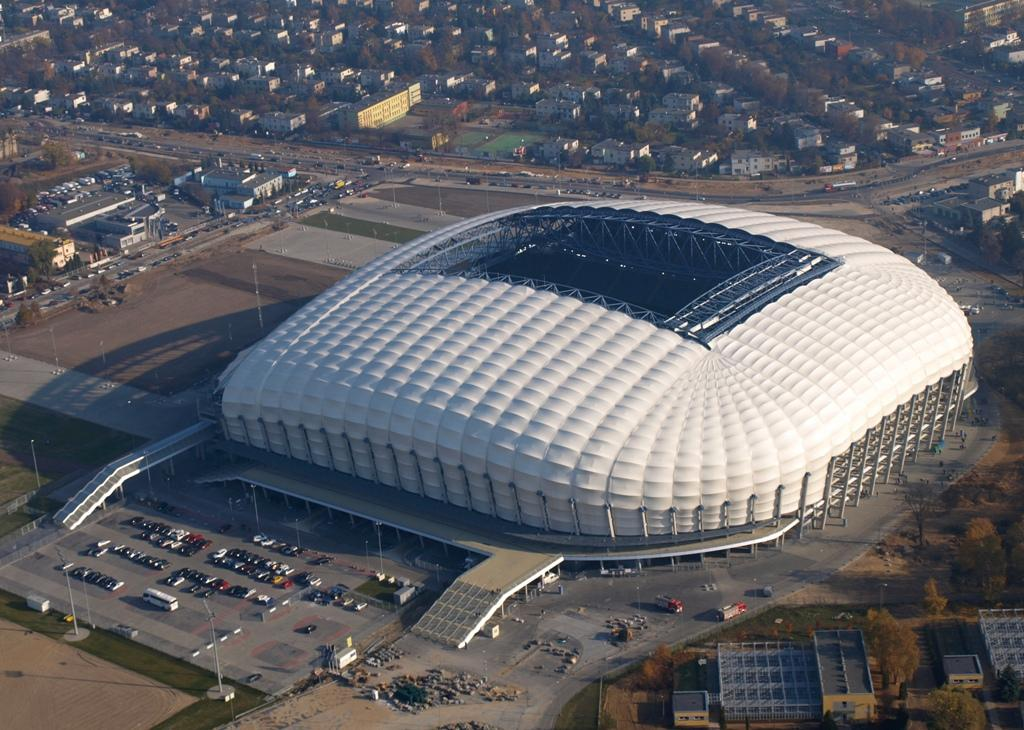
ENEA Stadion

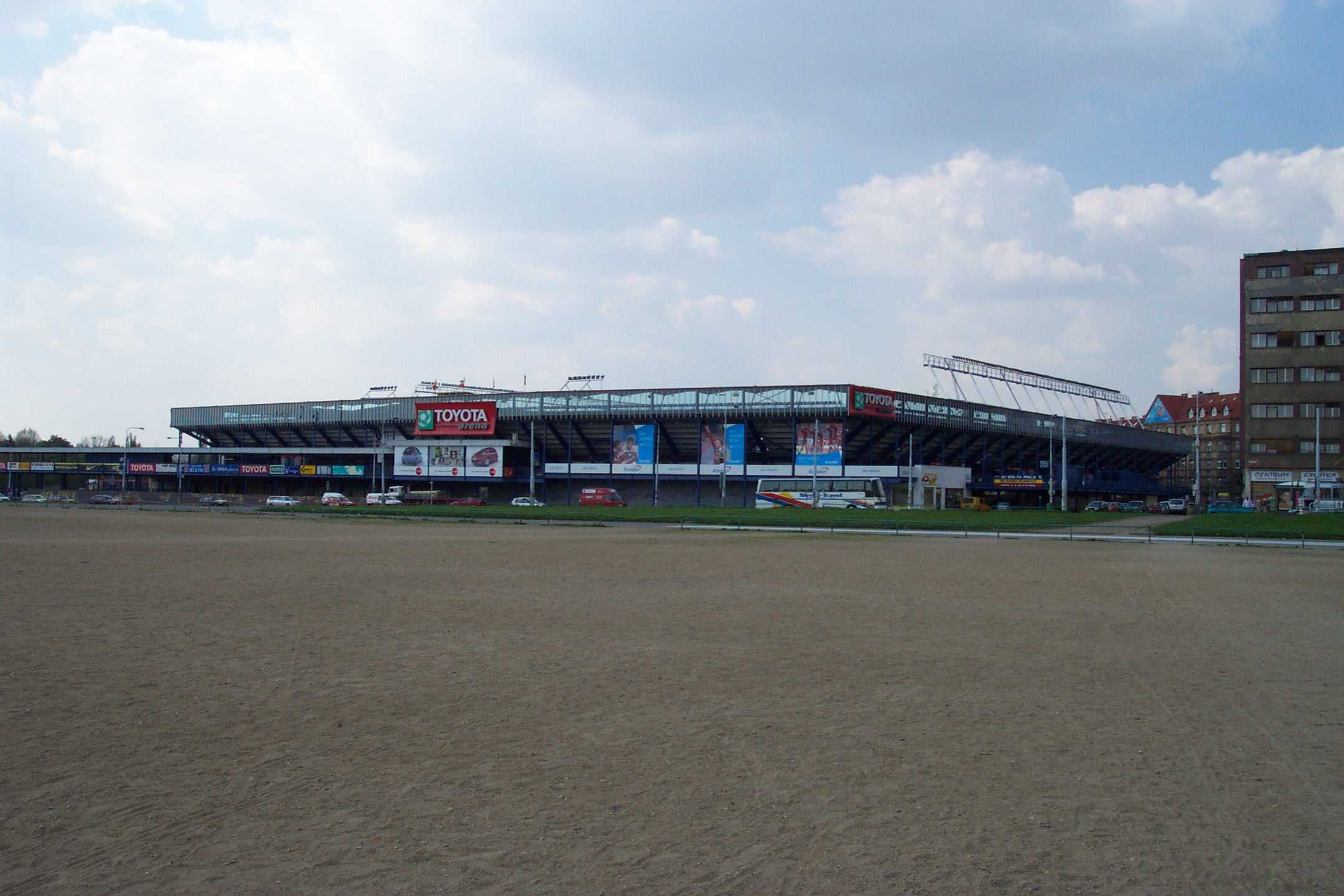
epet ARENA

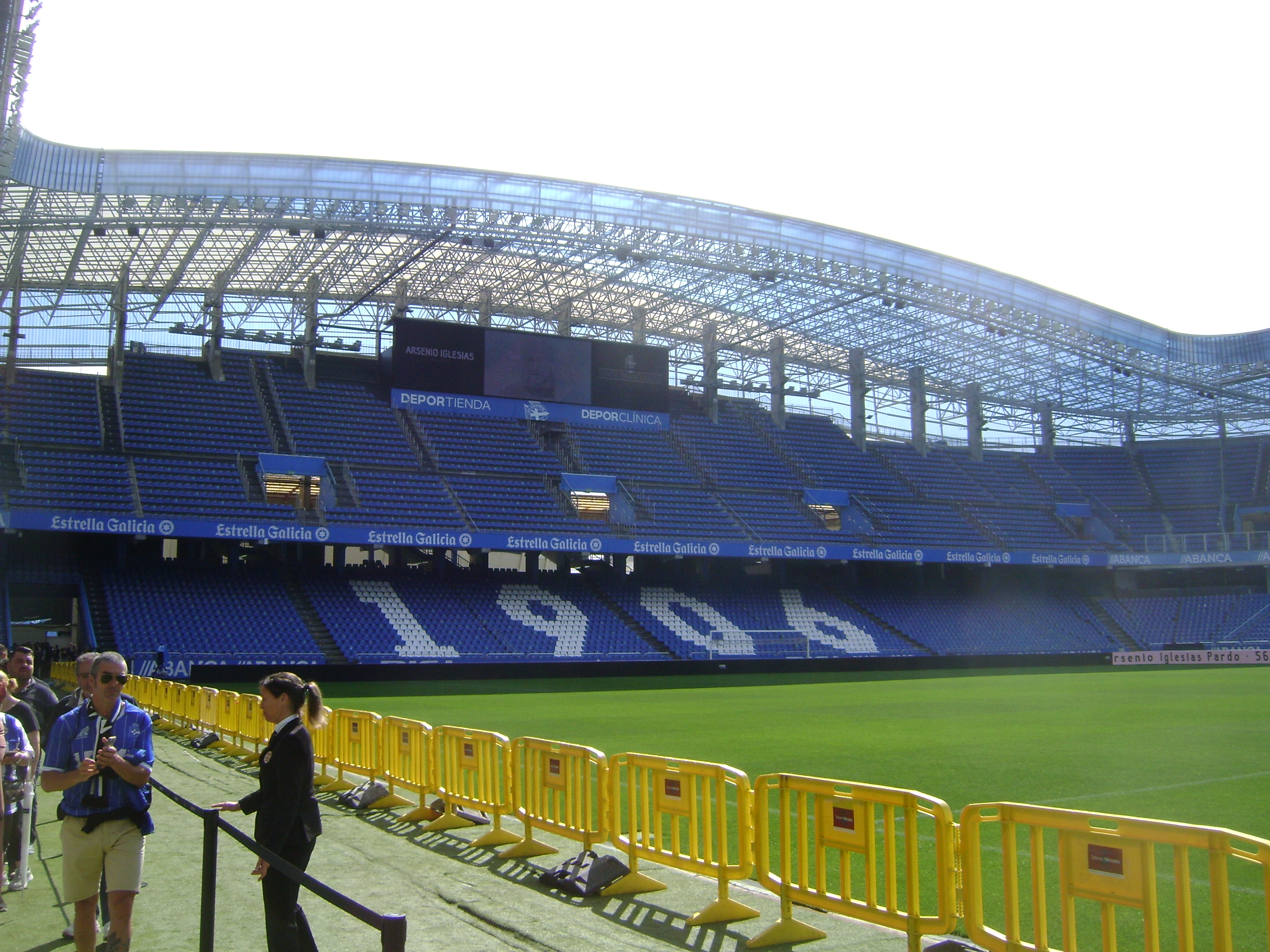
Estadio ABANCA-RIAZOR

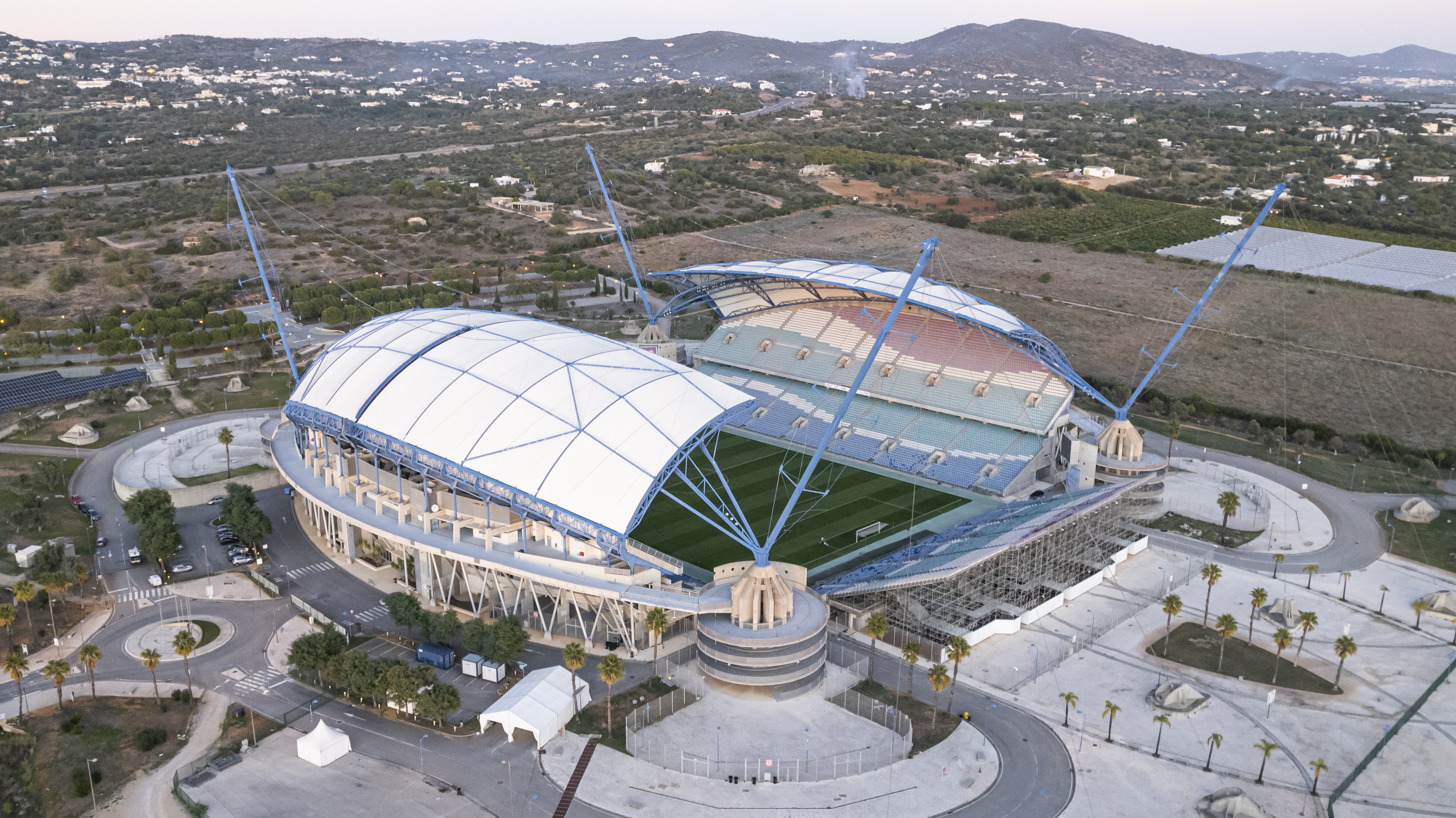
Estádio Algarve

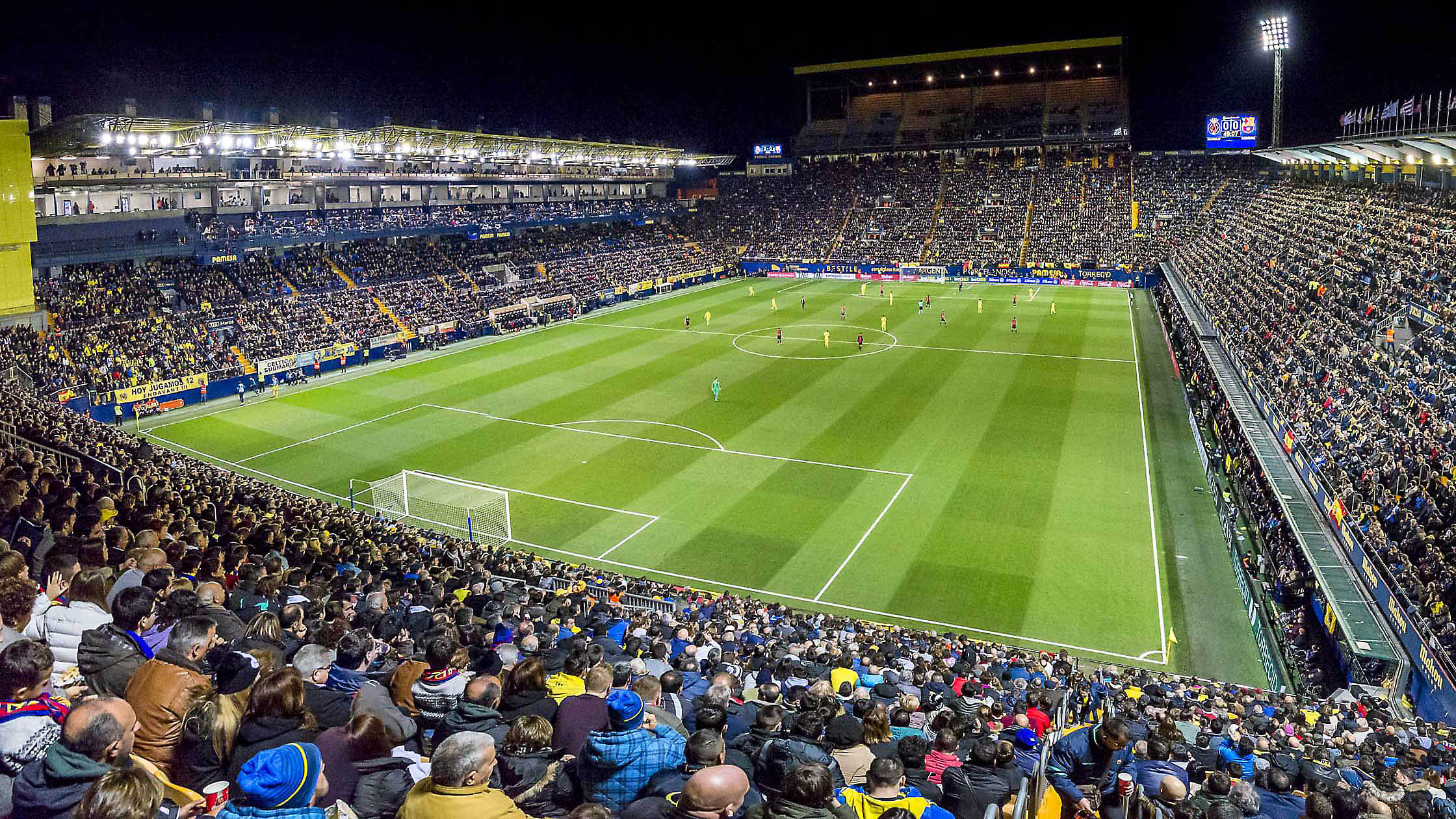
Estadio de la Cerámica

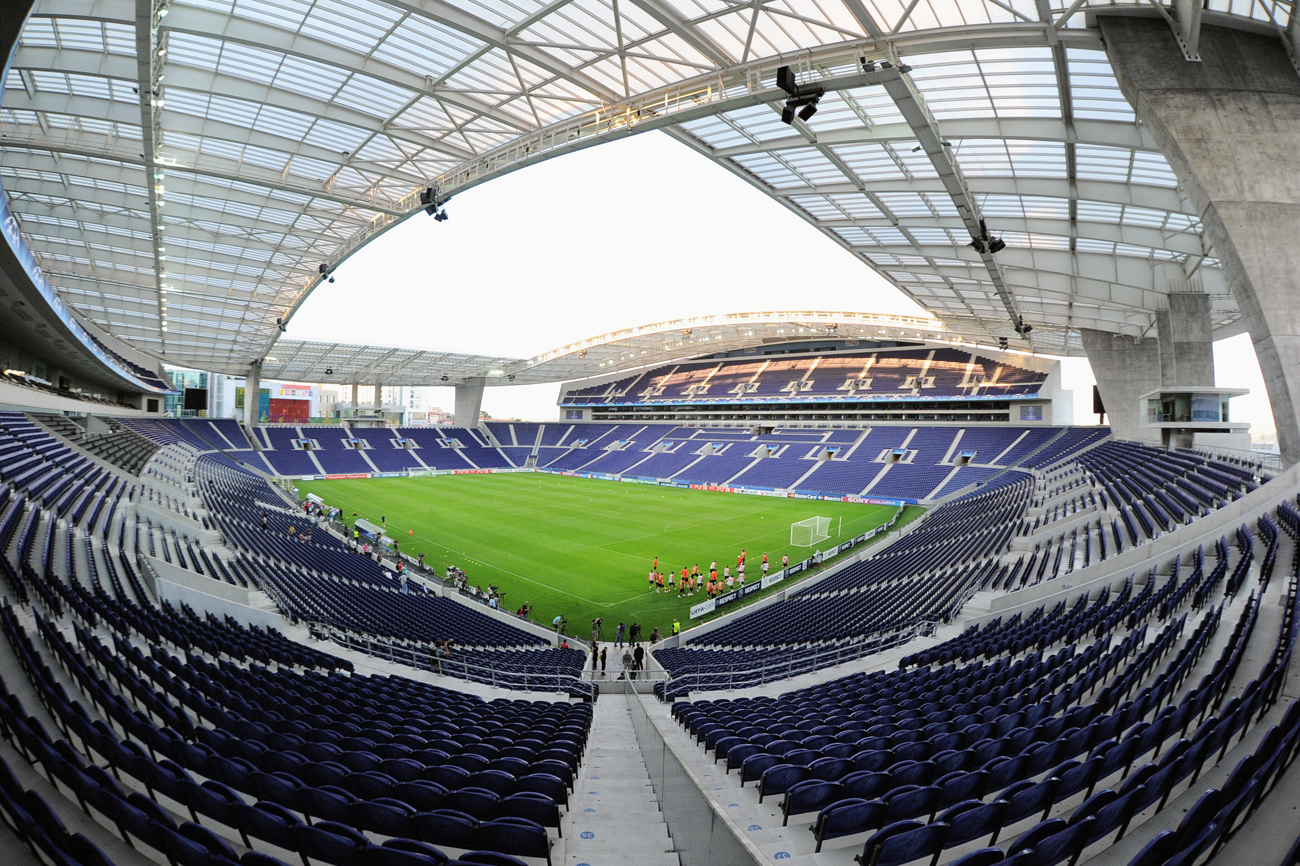
Estádio do Dragão

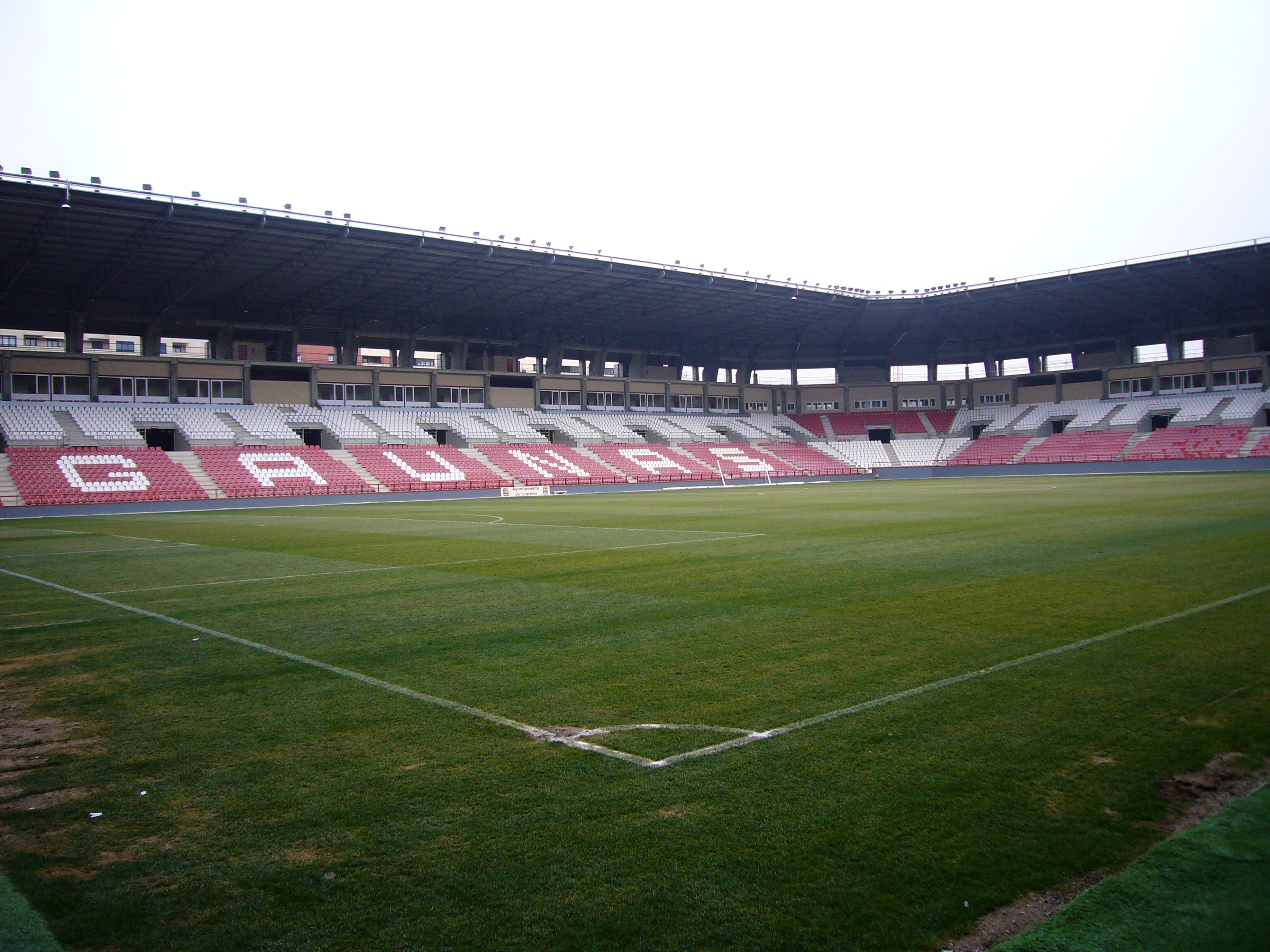
Estadio Las Gaunas

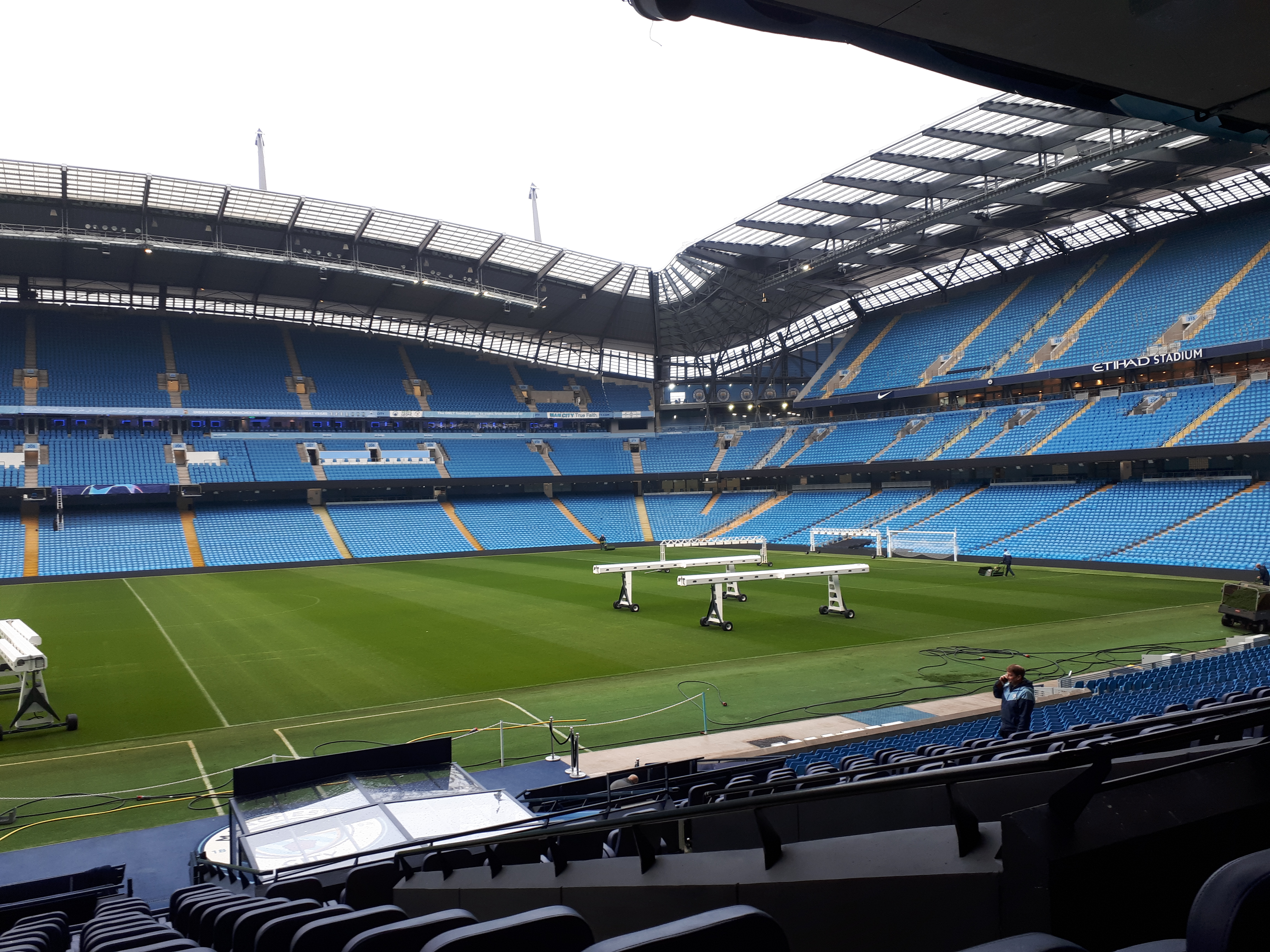
Etihad Stadium

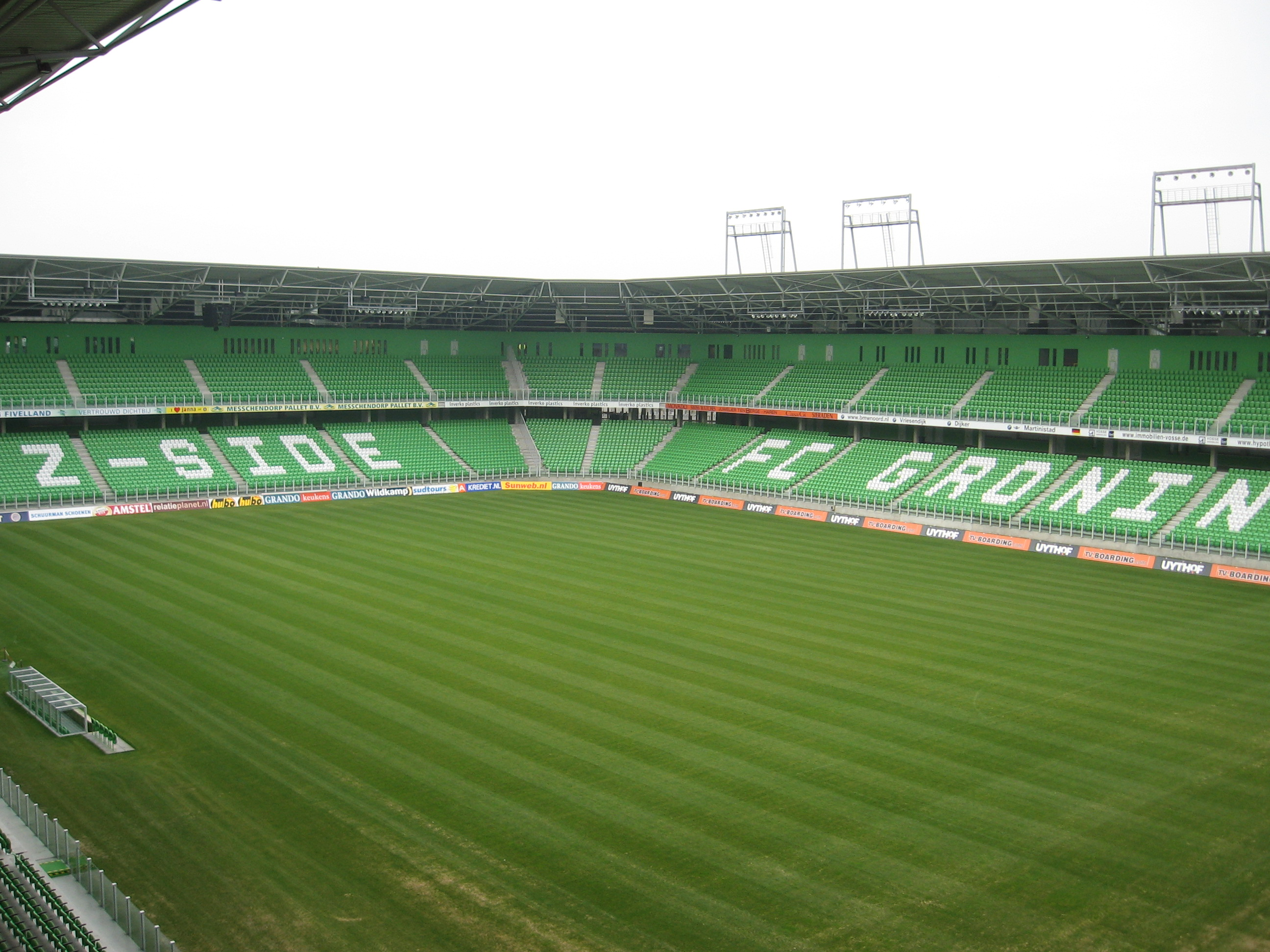
Euroborg

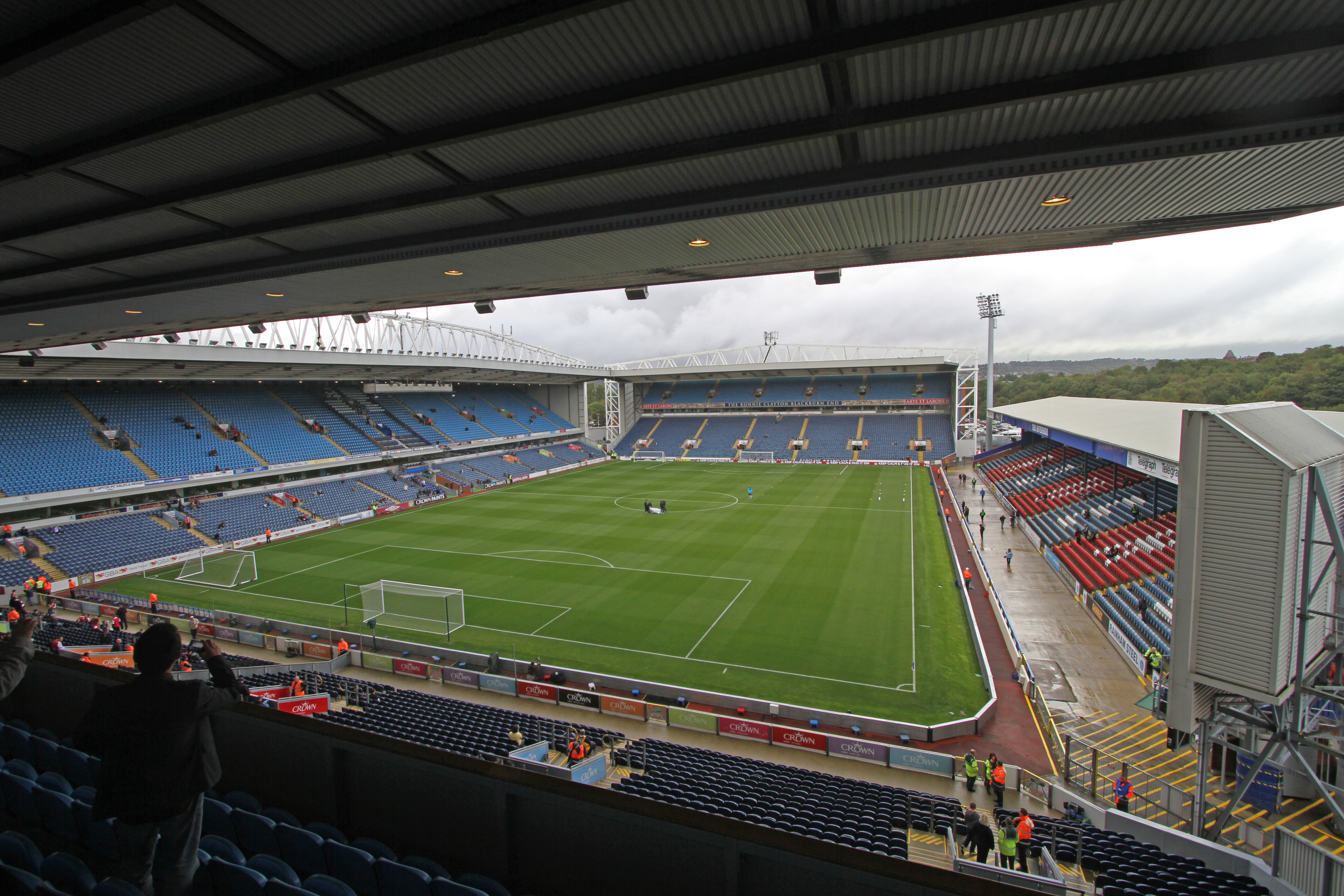
Ewood Park

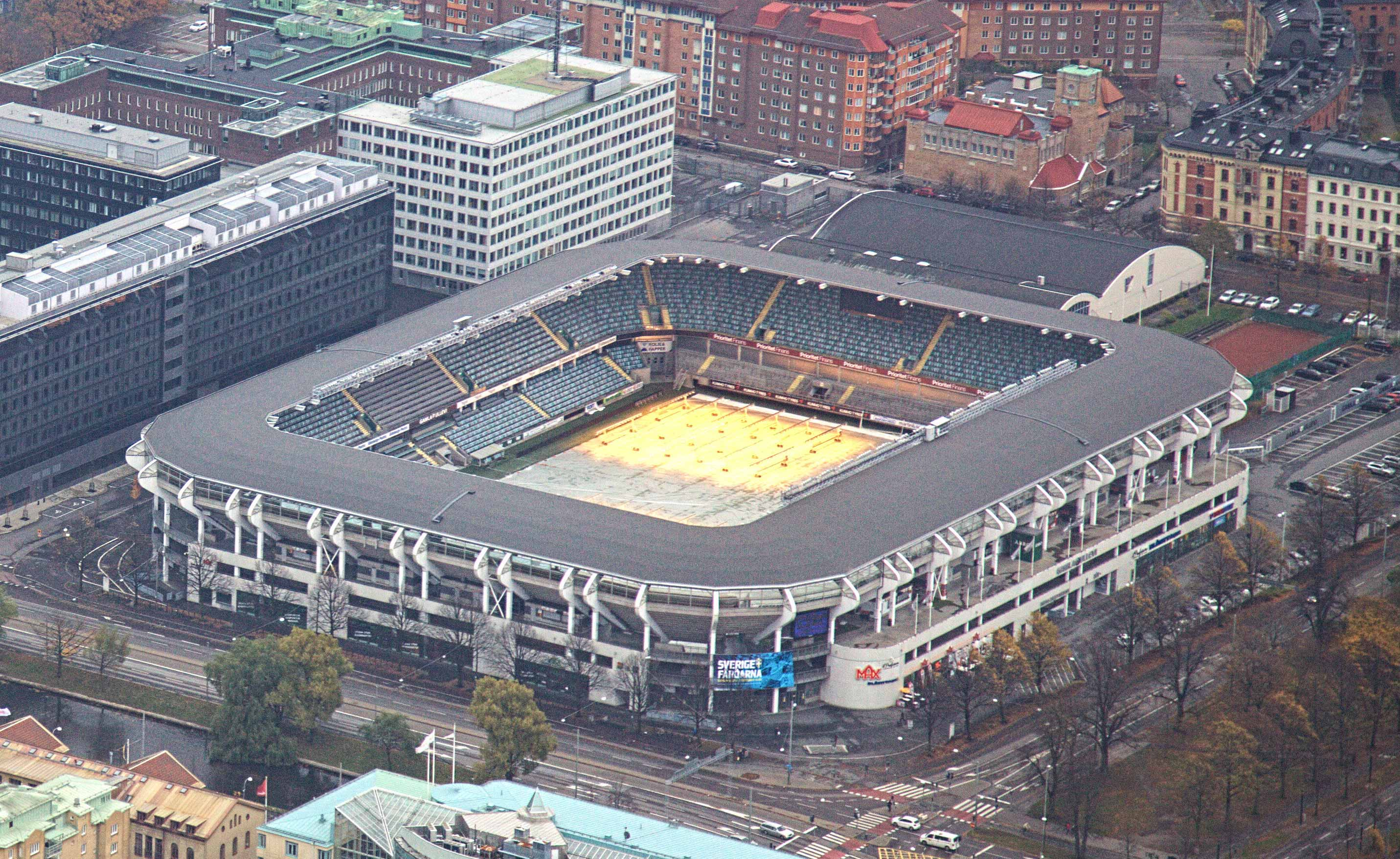
Gamla Ullevi

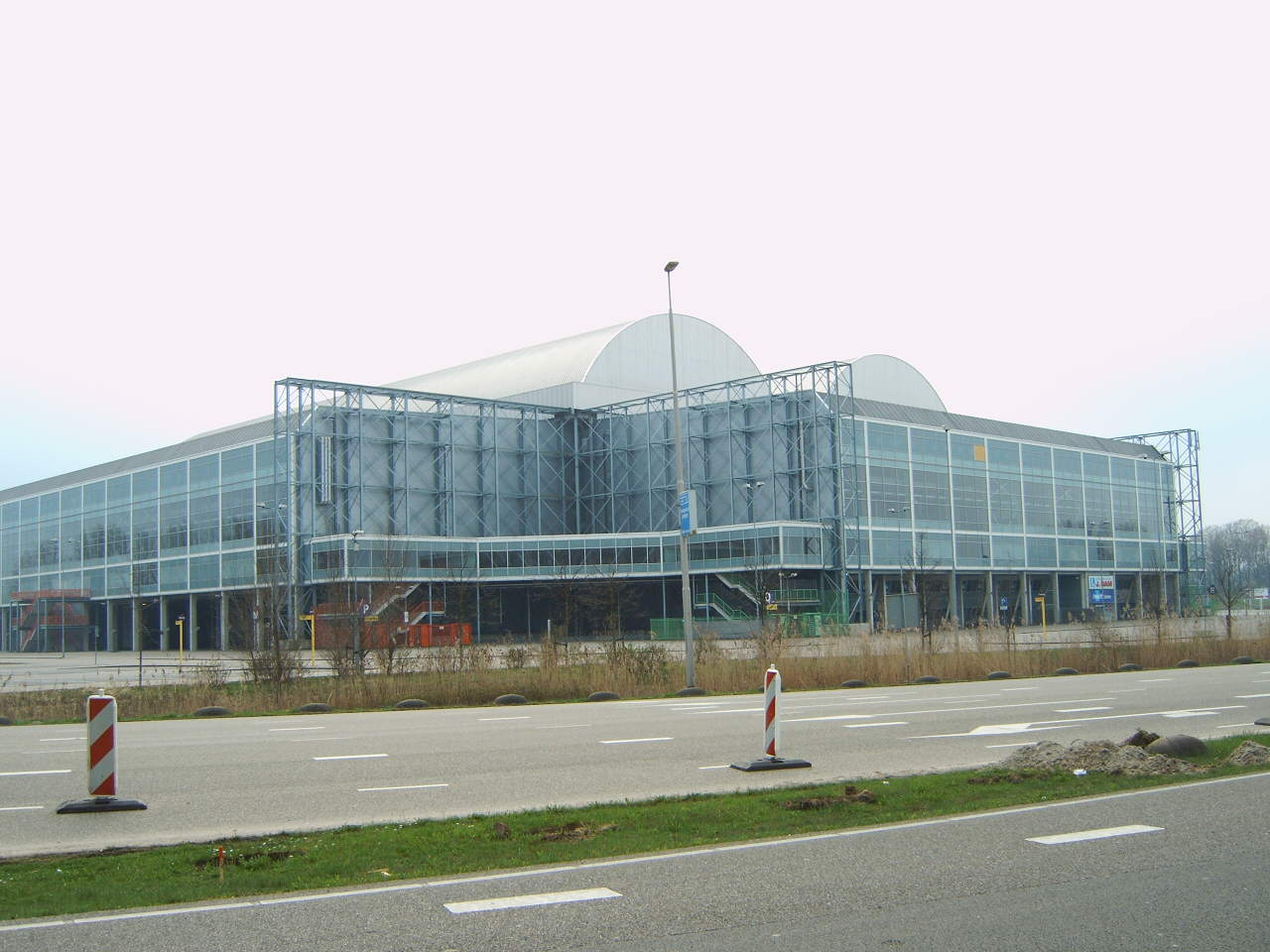
GelreDome

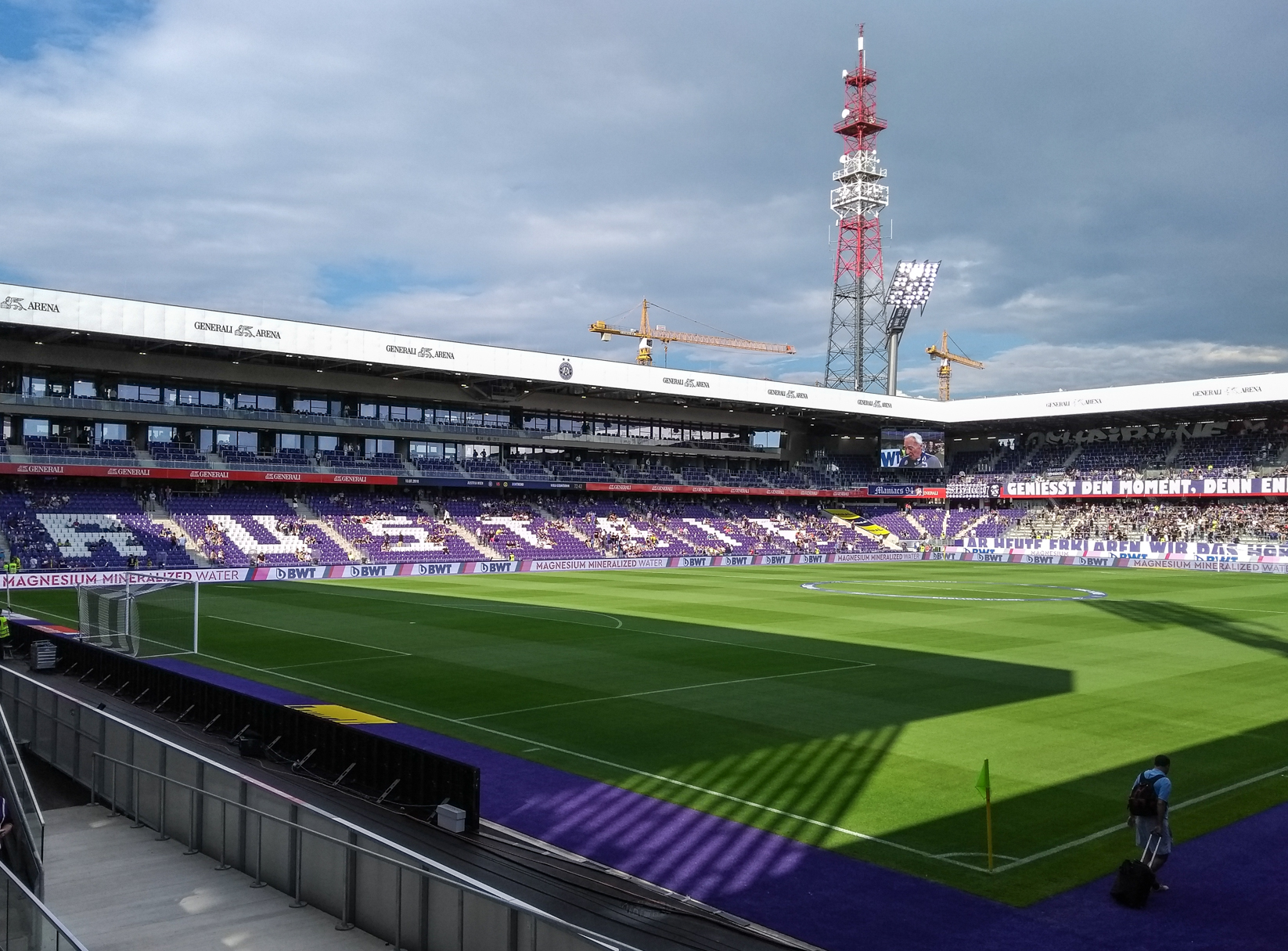
Generali Arena

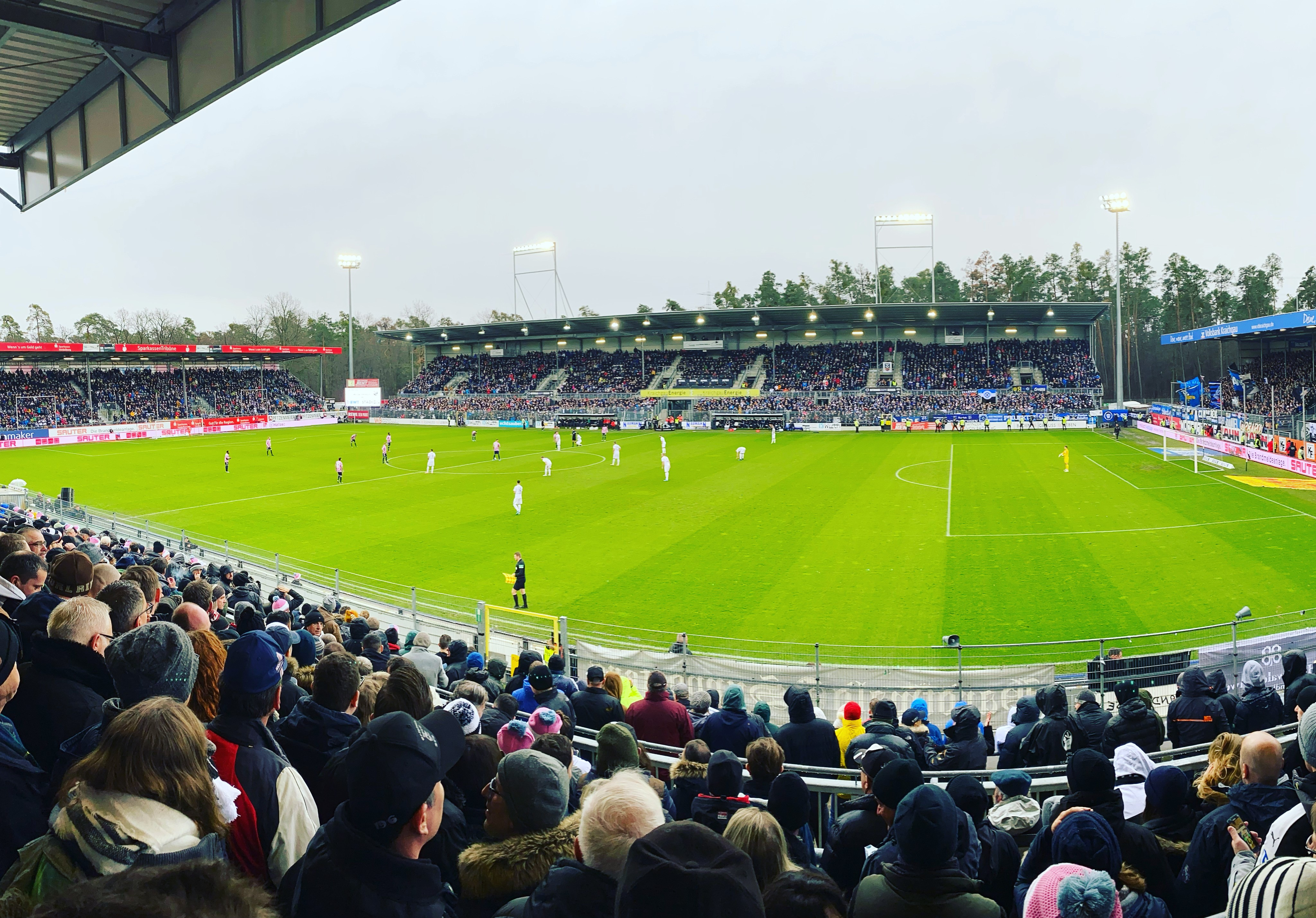
GP Stadion am Hardtwald

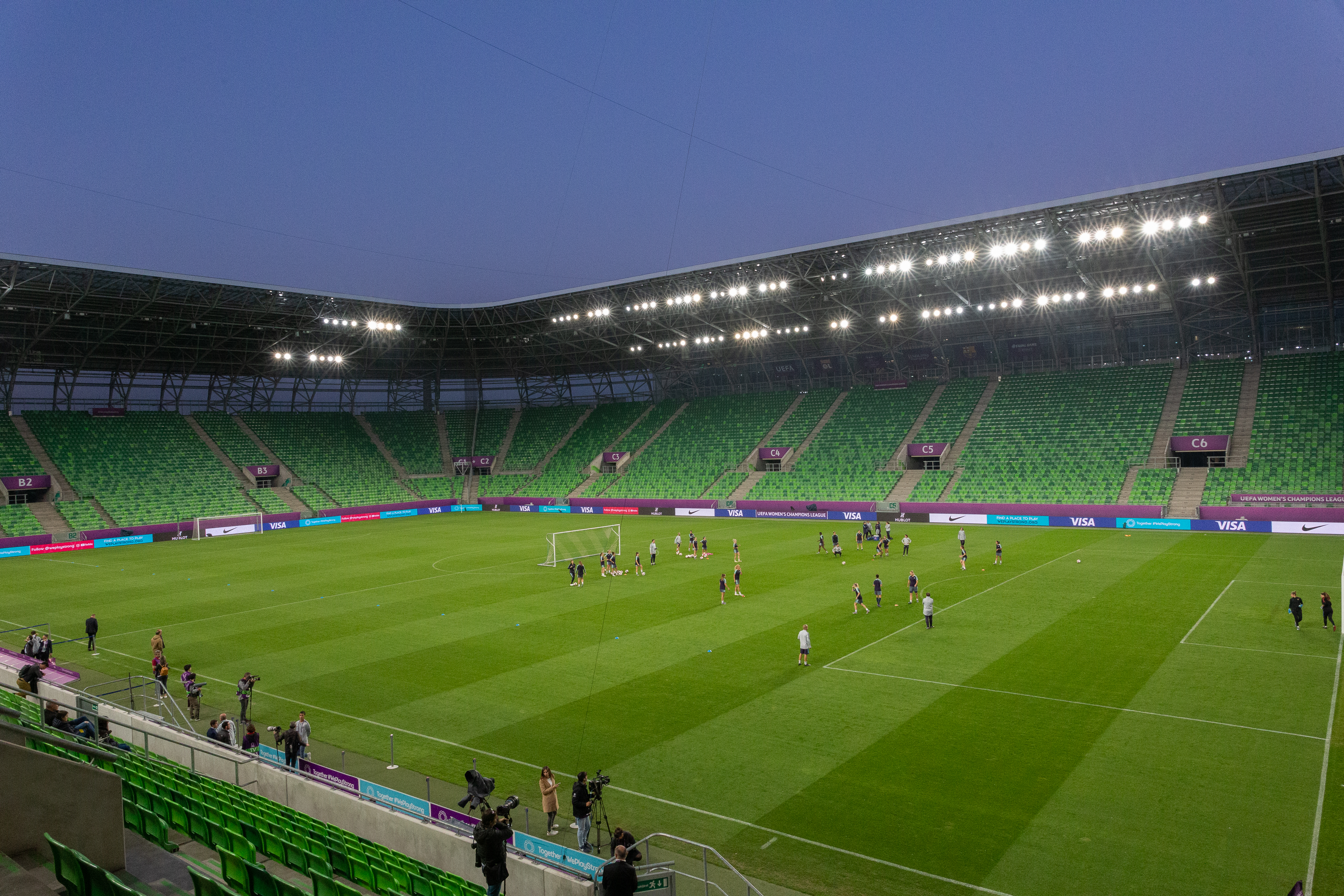
Groupama Aréna

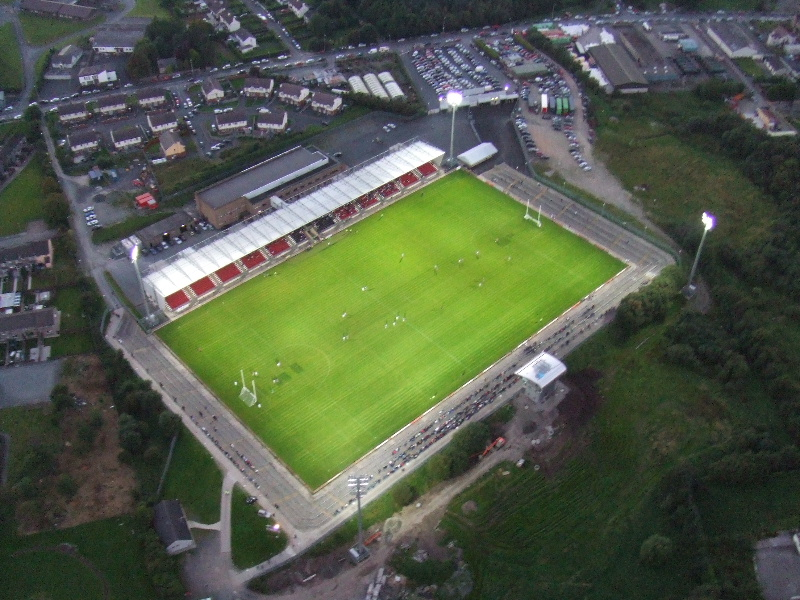
Healy Park

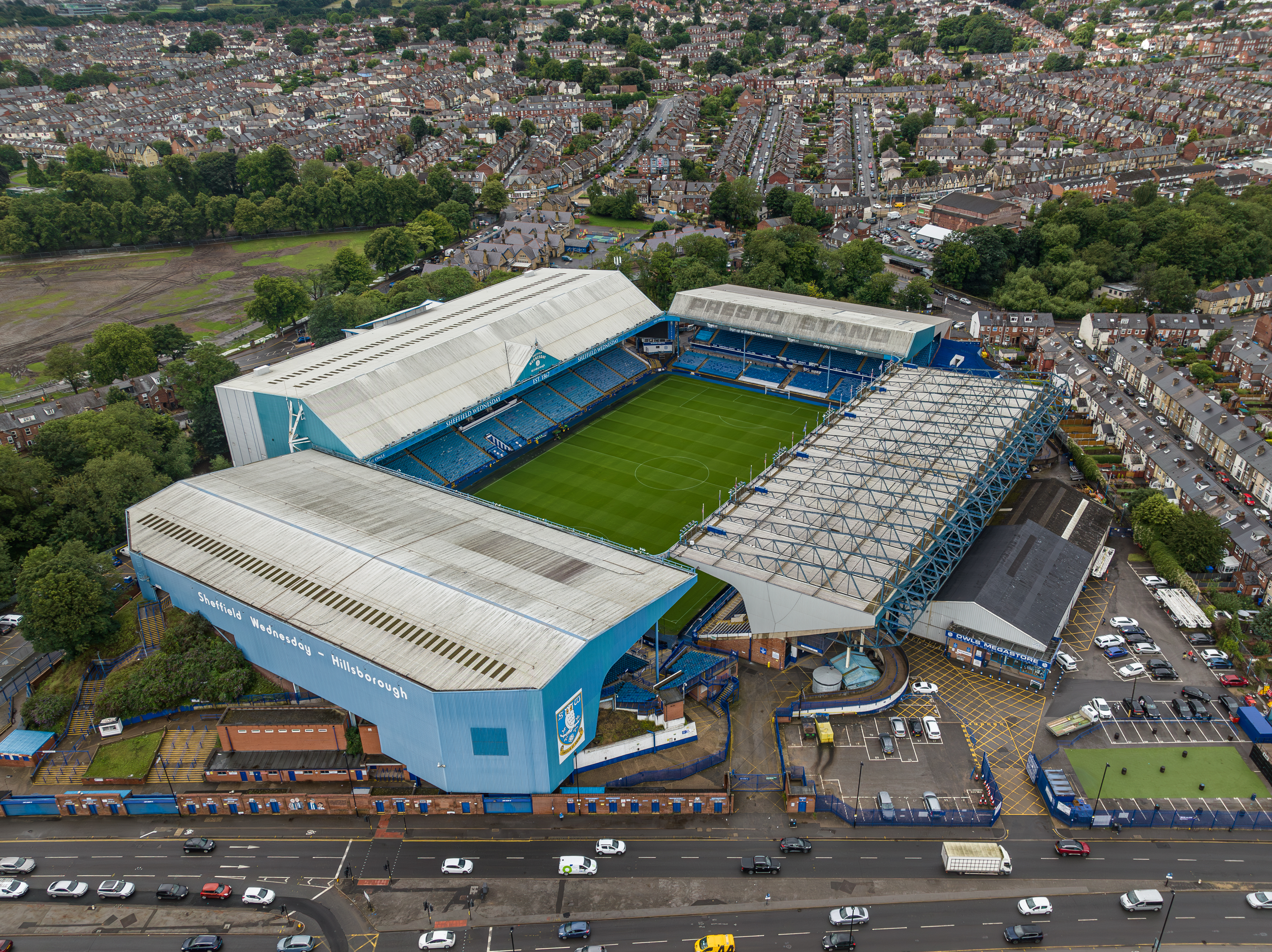
Hillsborough Stadium

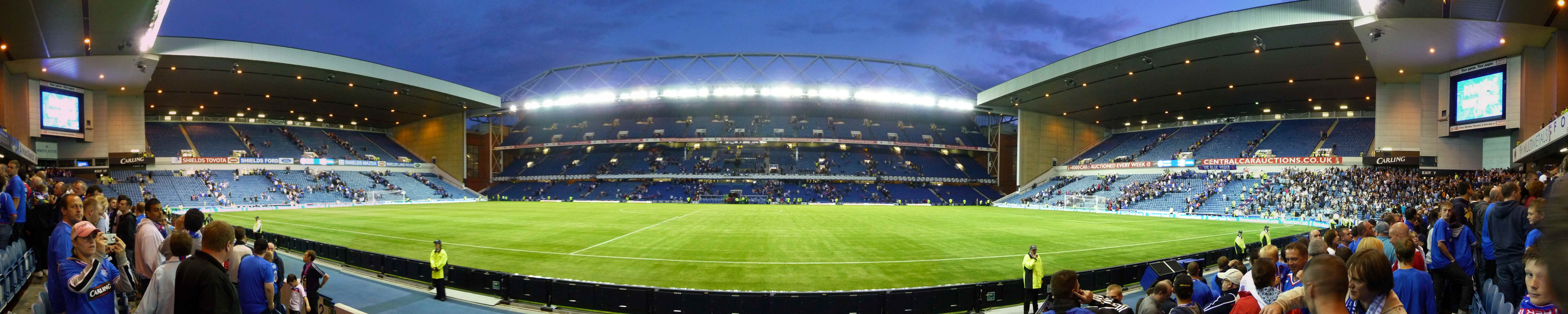
Ibrox Stadium

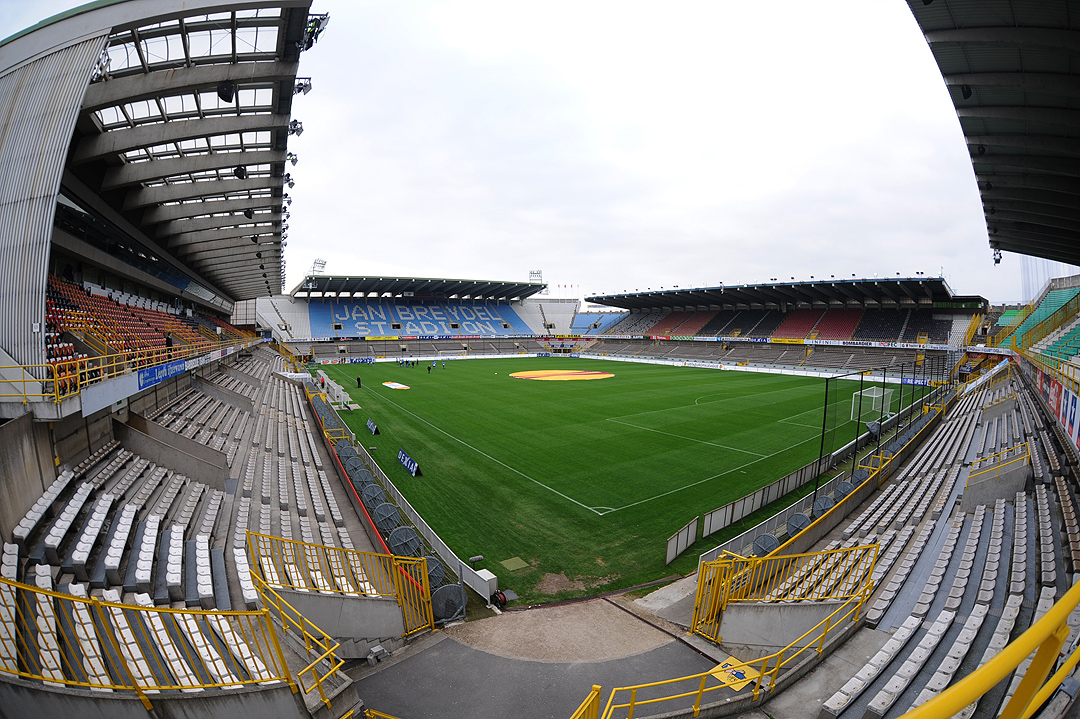
Jan Breydelstadion

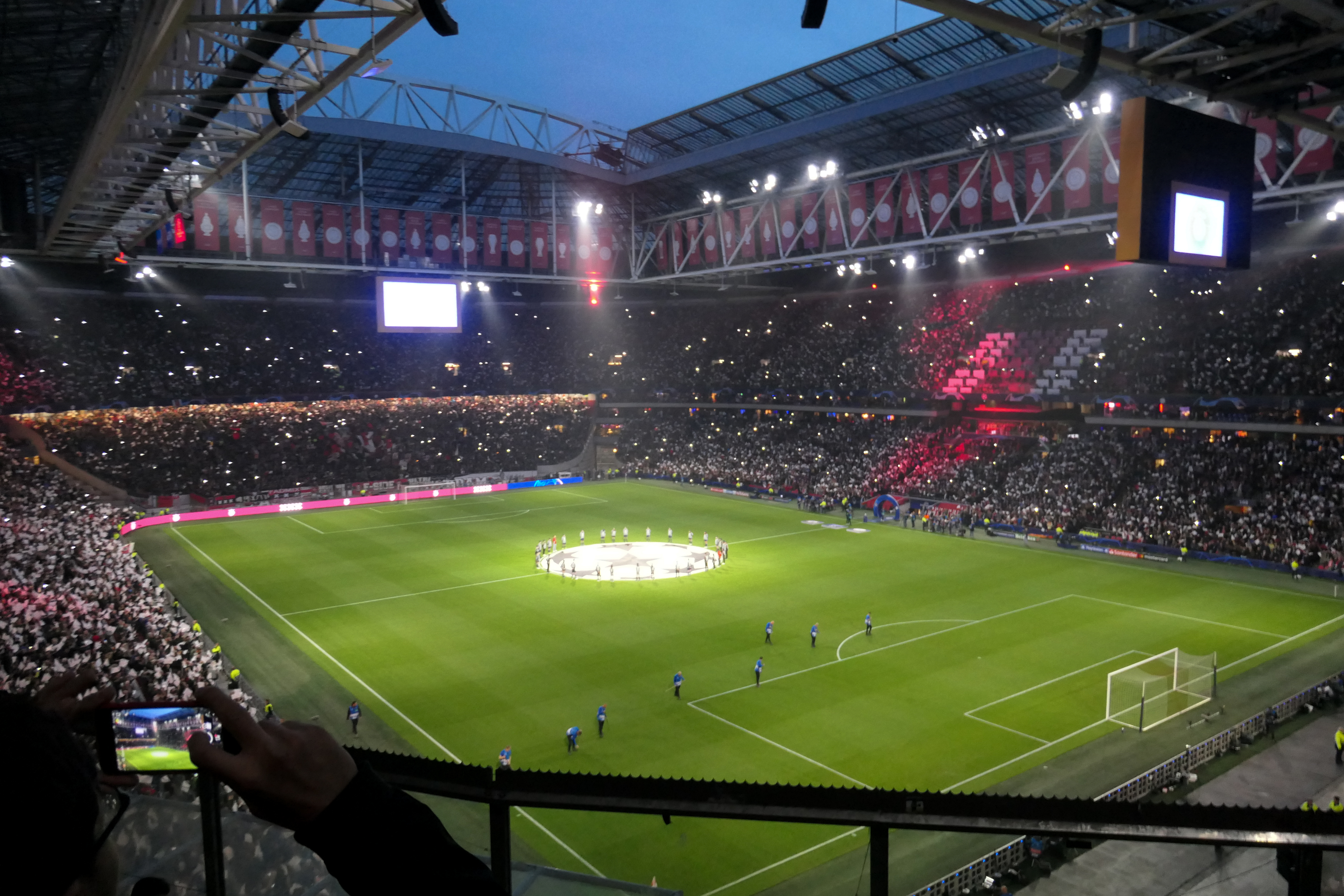
Johan Cruijff Arena

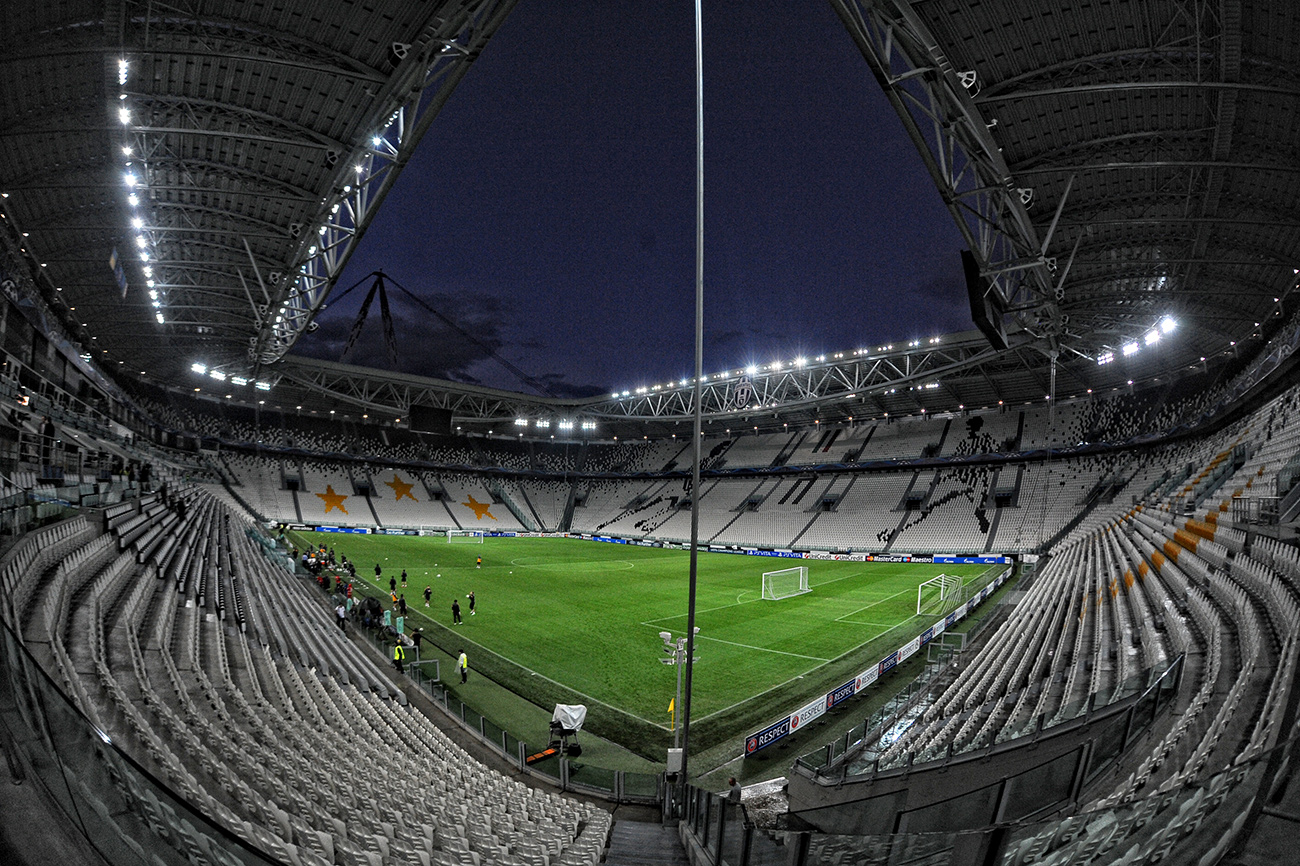
Juventus Stadium

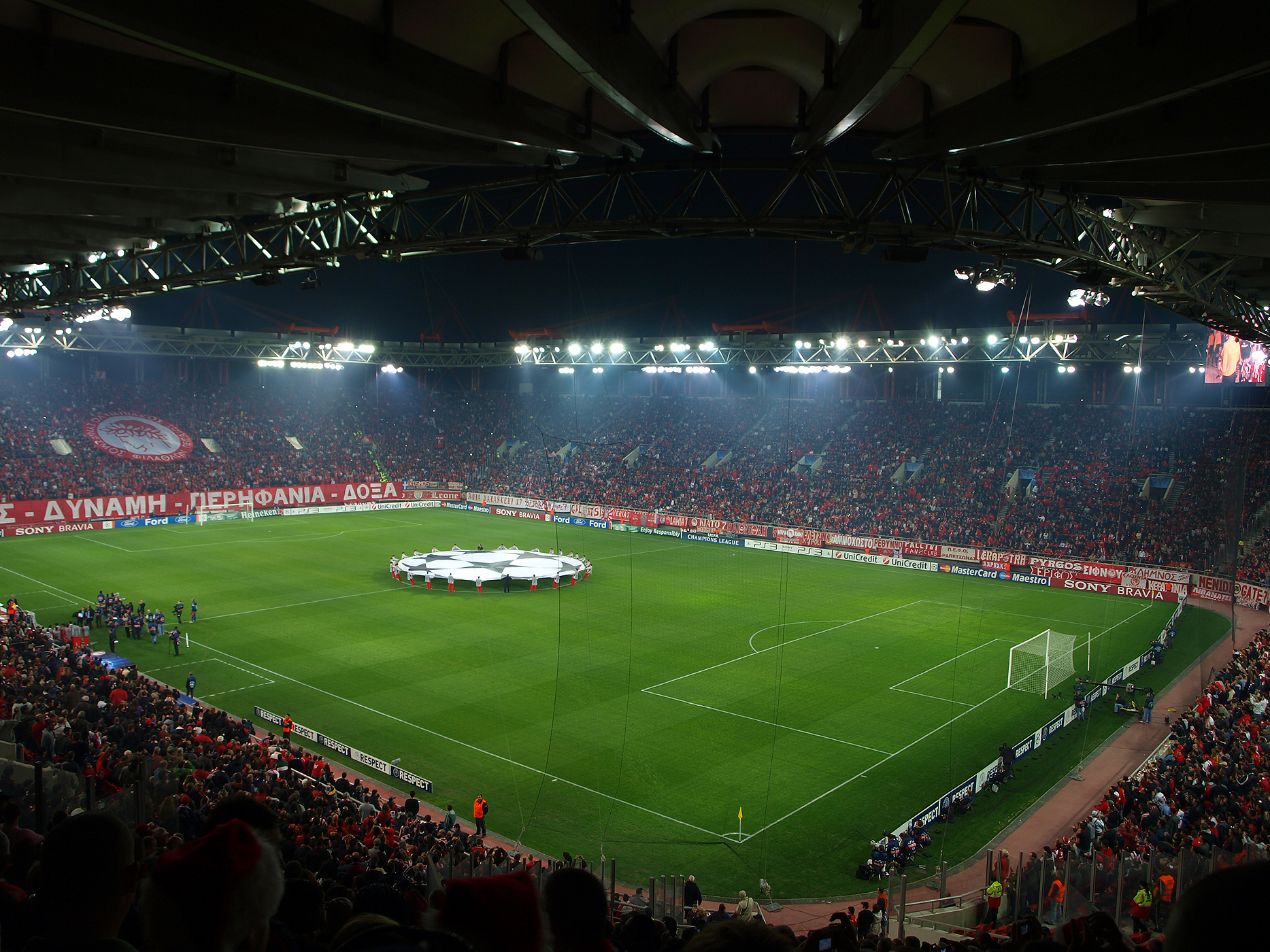
Karaiskakis Stadium

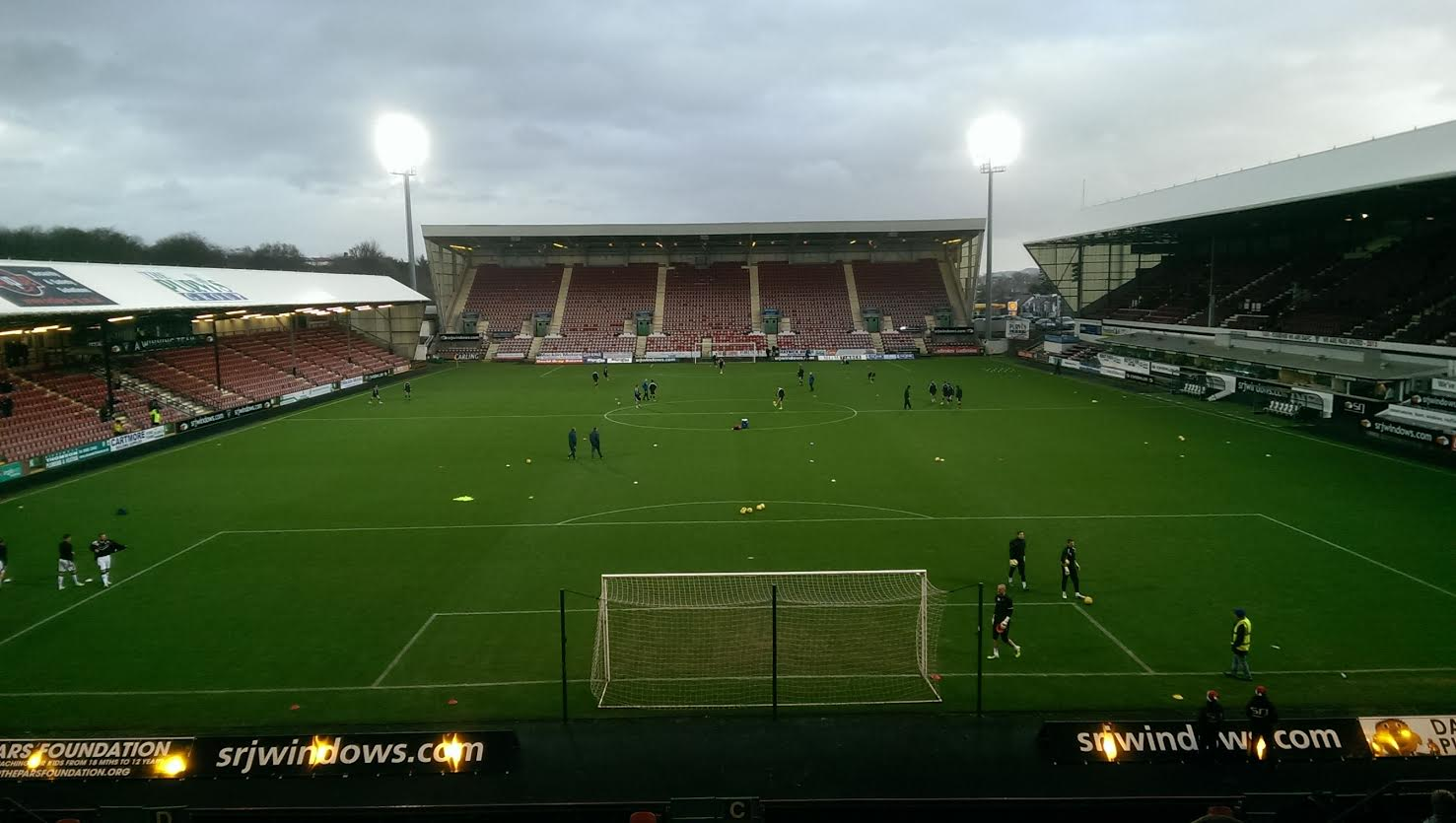
KDM Group East End Park

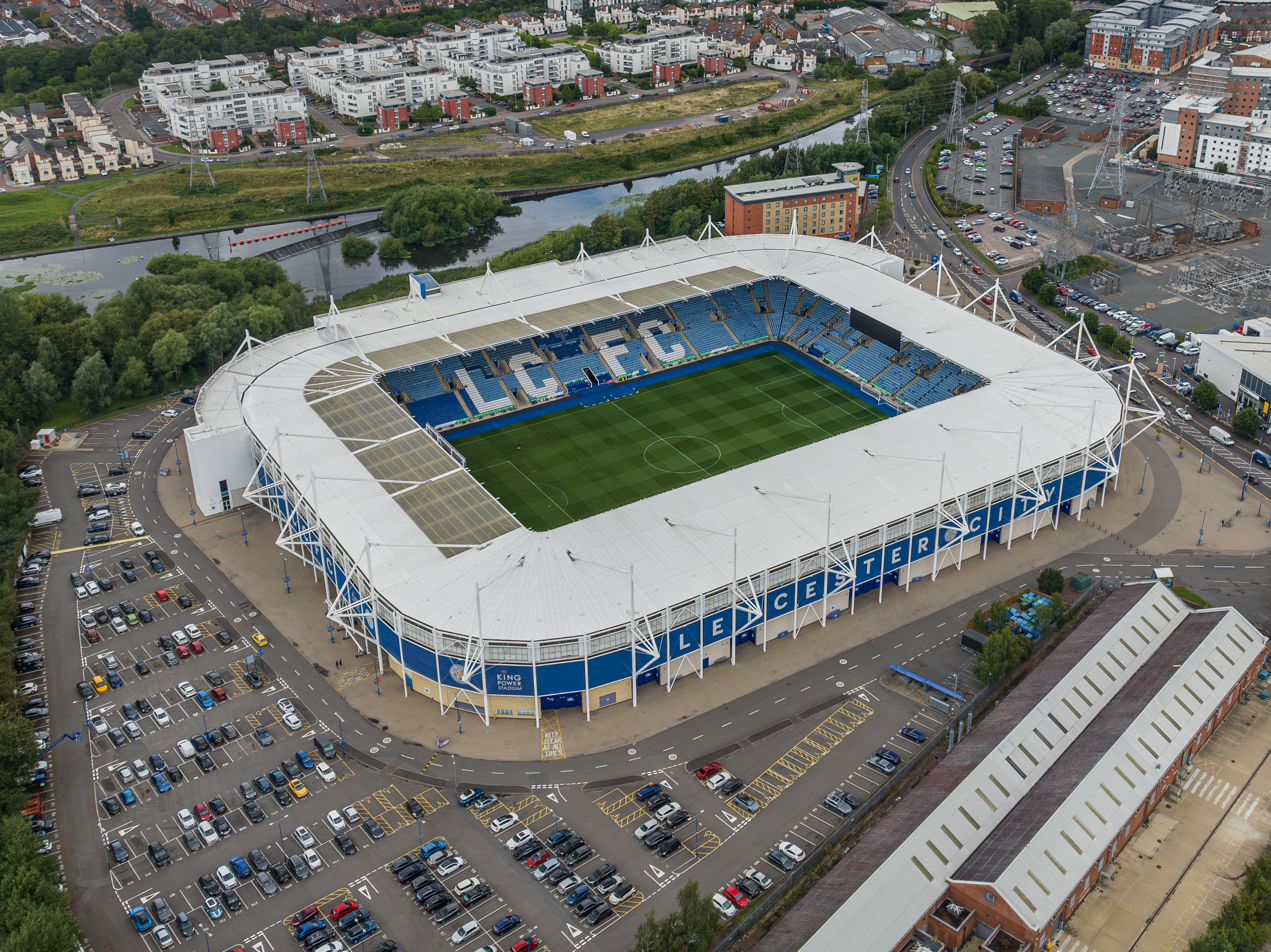
King Power Stadium

Ljudski vrt

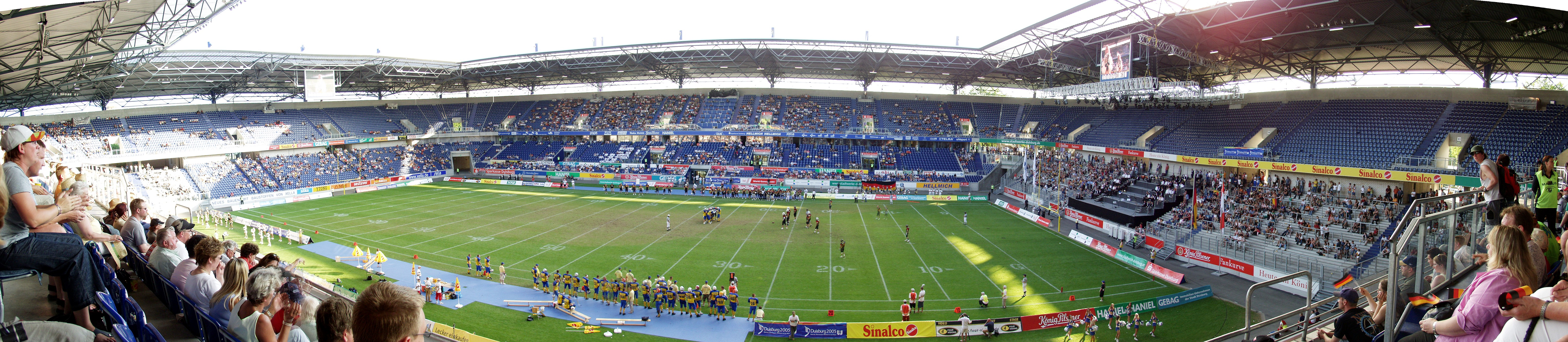
MSV-Arena

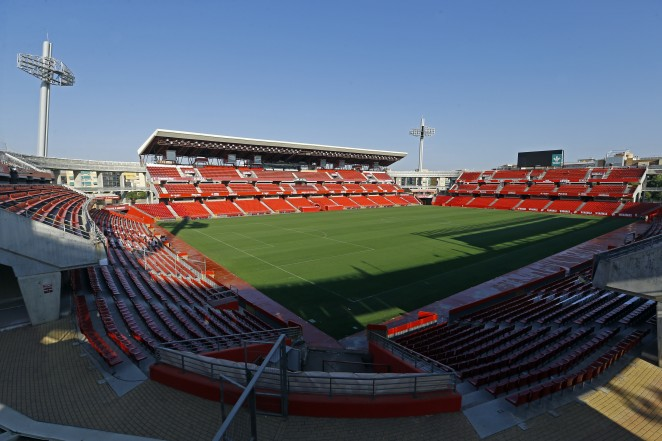
Nuevo Estadio de Los Cármenes

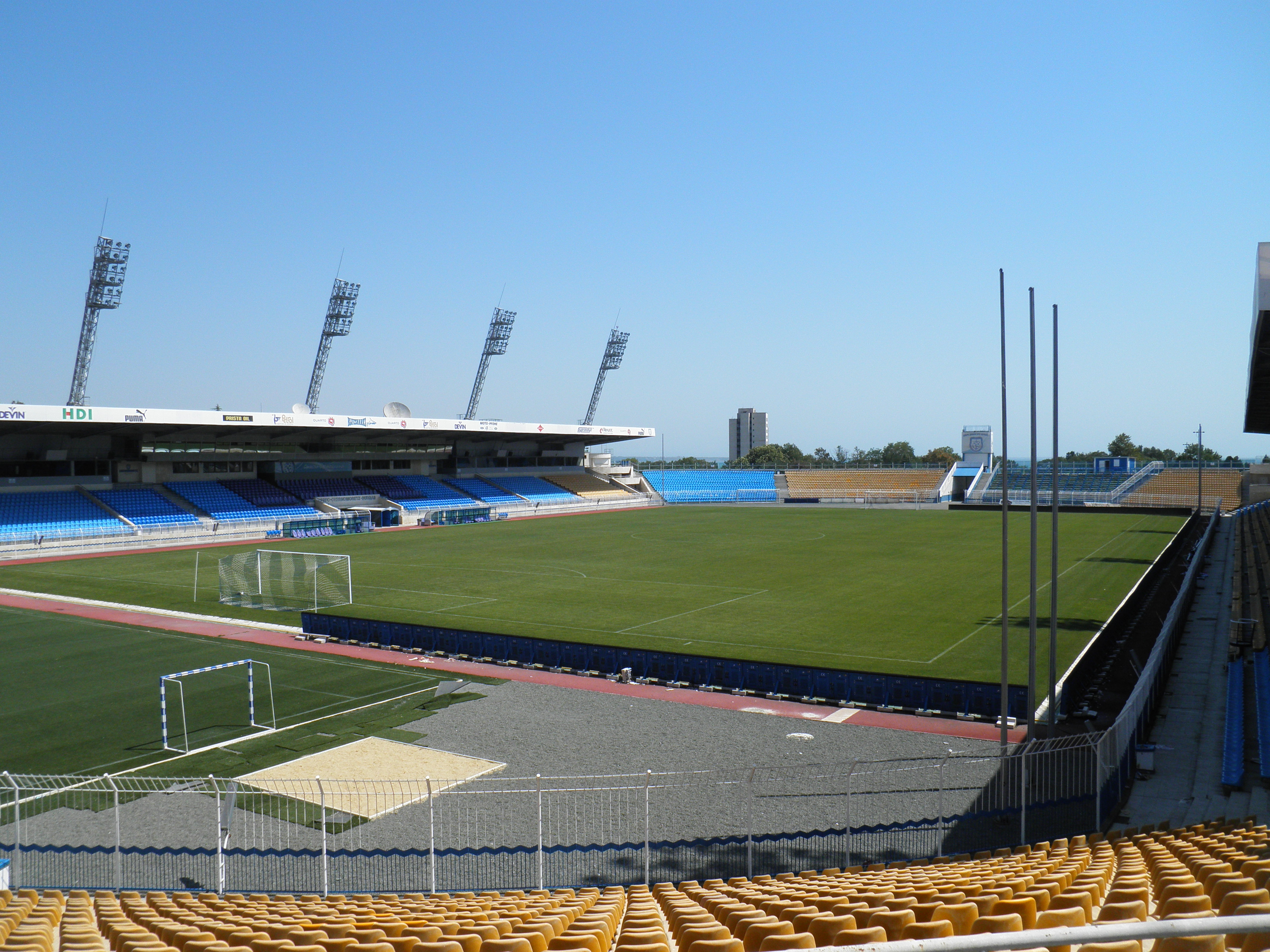
Lazur Stadium

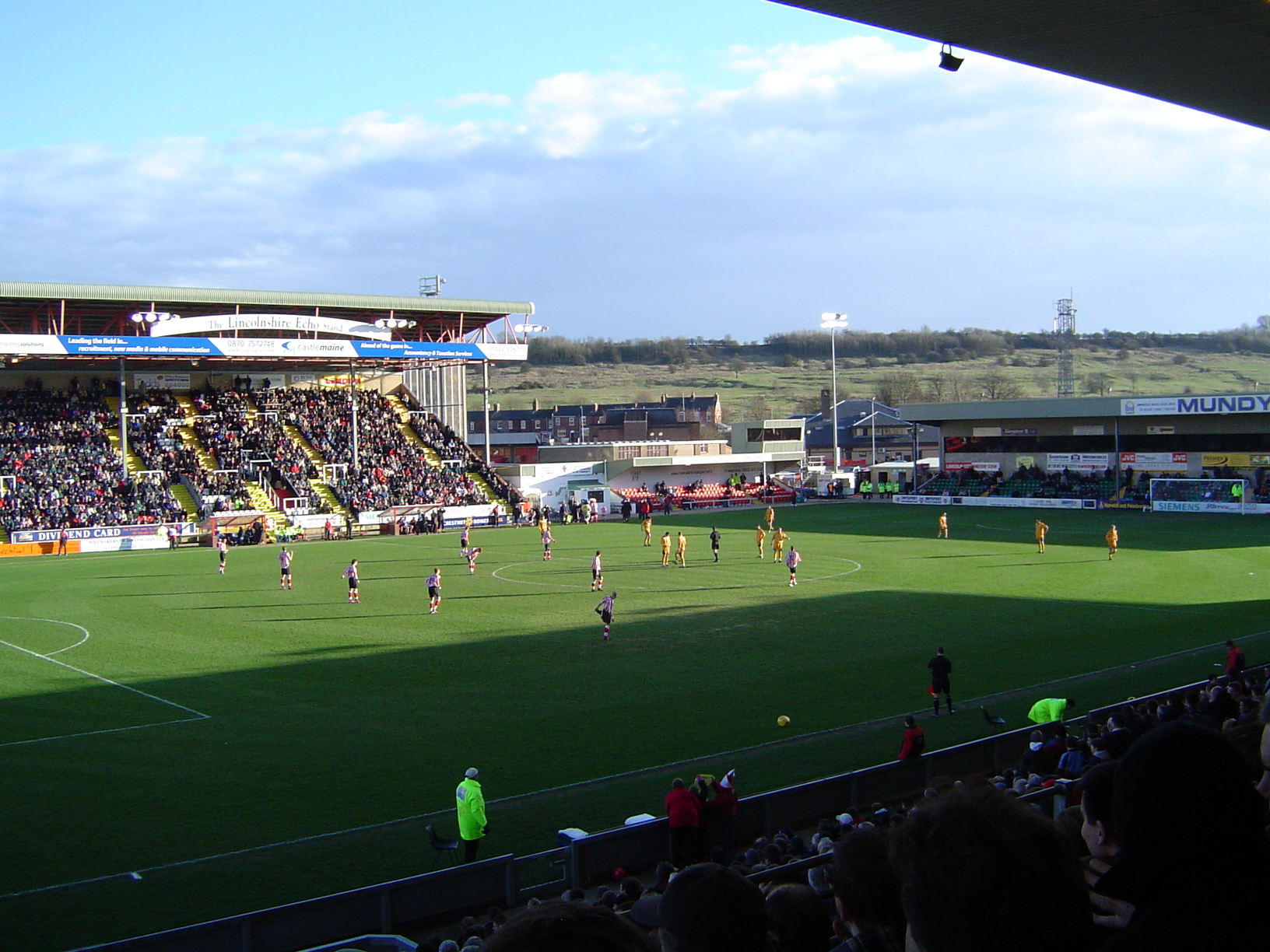
LNER Stadium

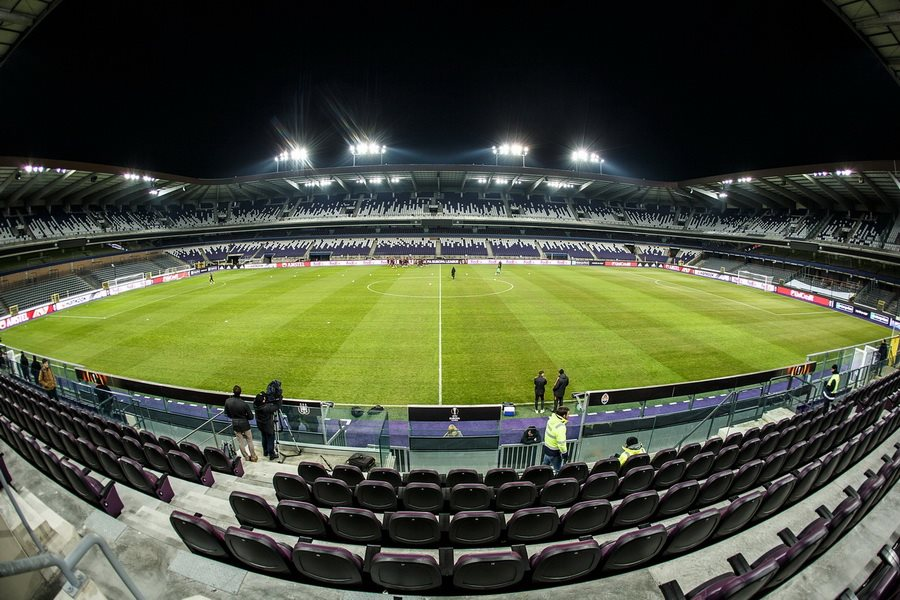
Lotto Park

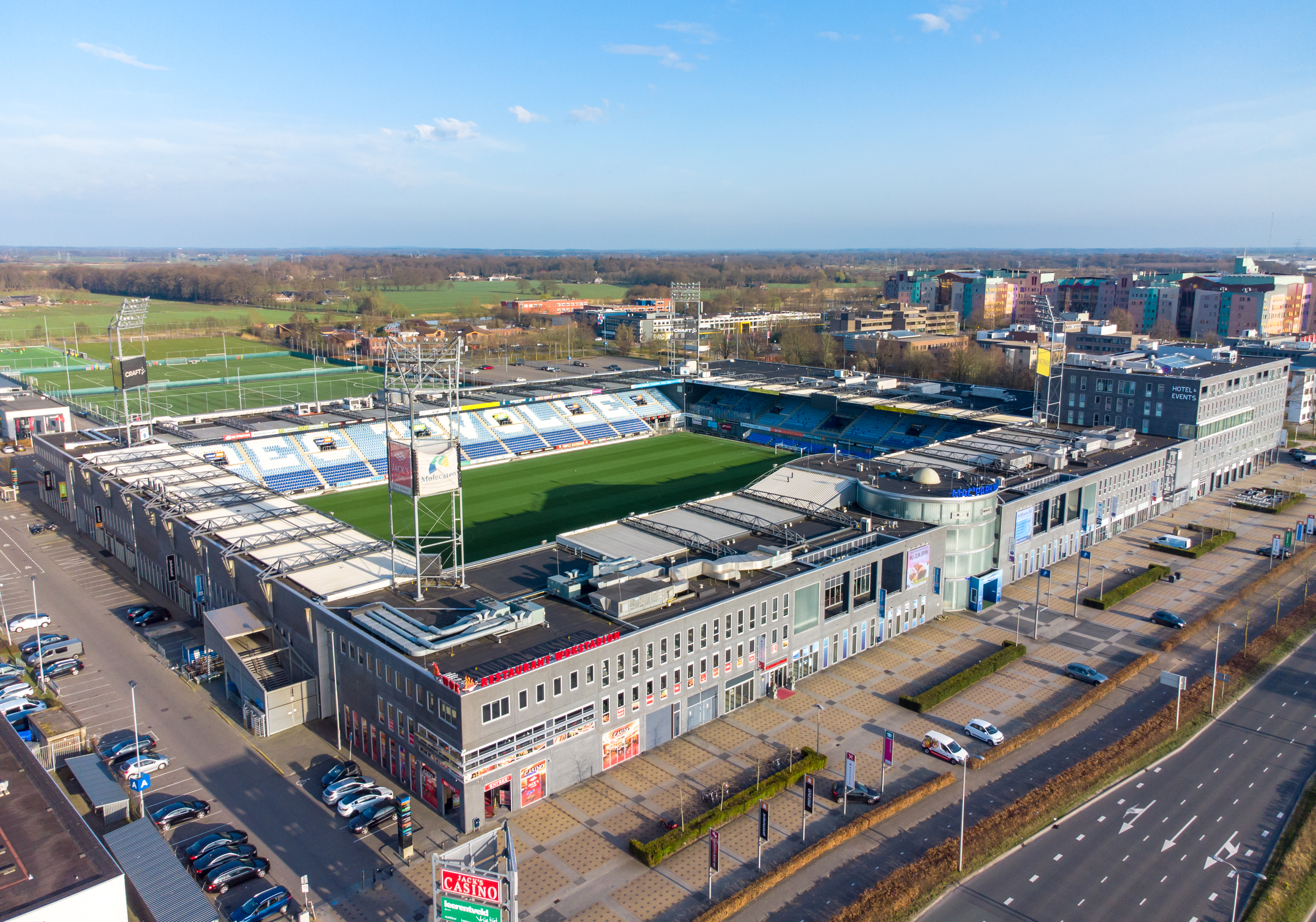
MAC³PARK Stadion

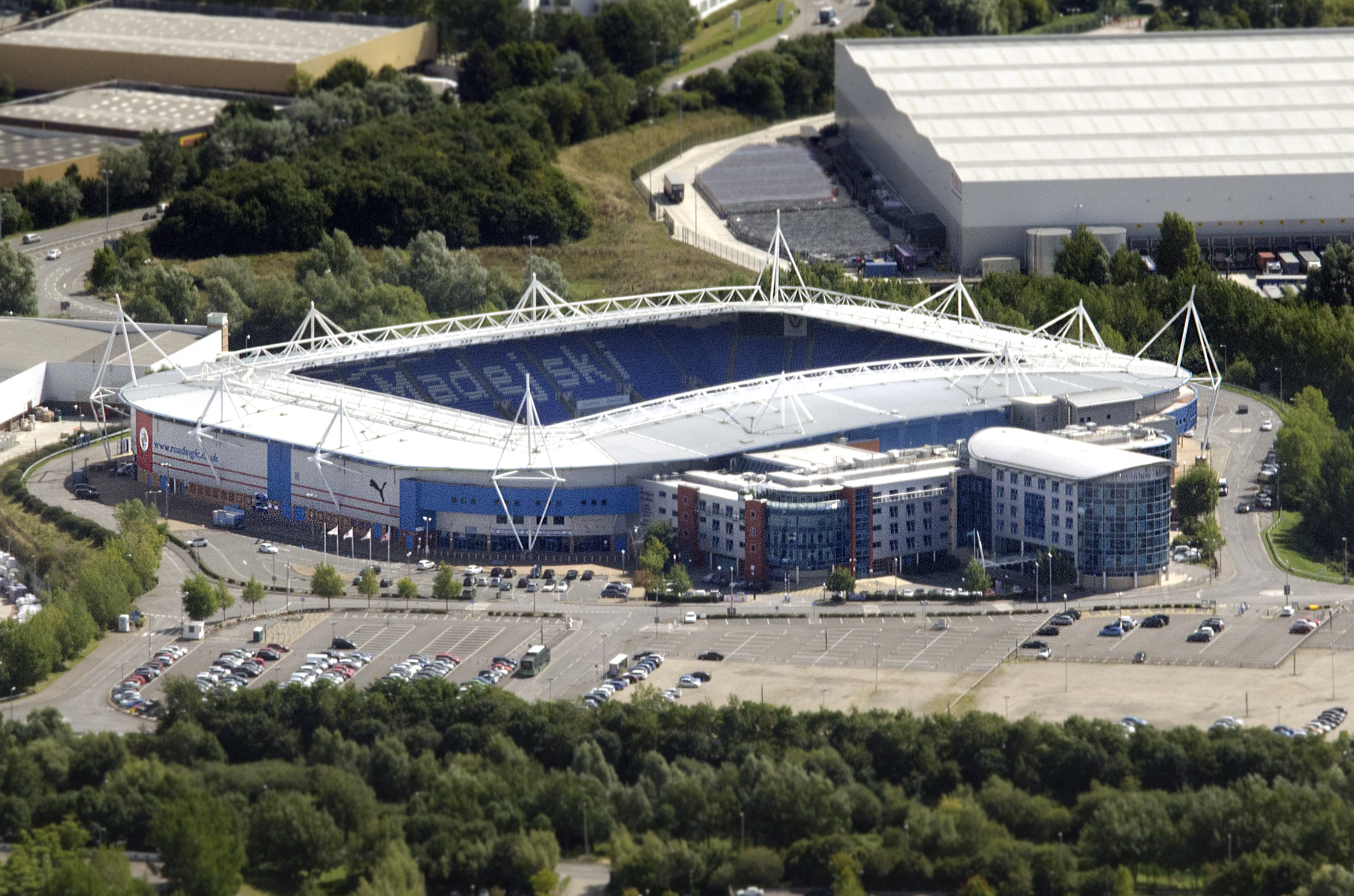
Madejski Stadium

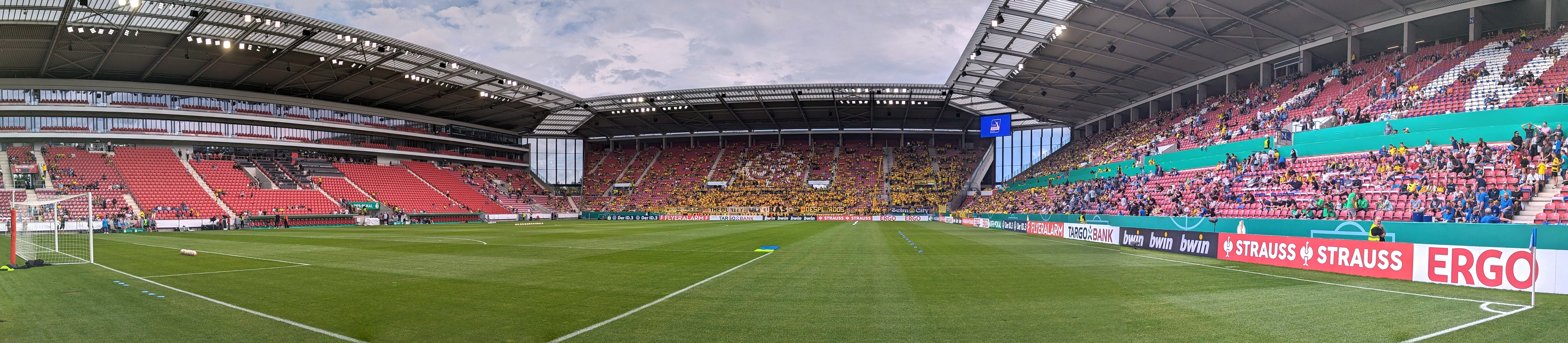
MEWA ARENA

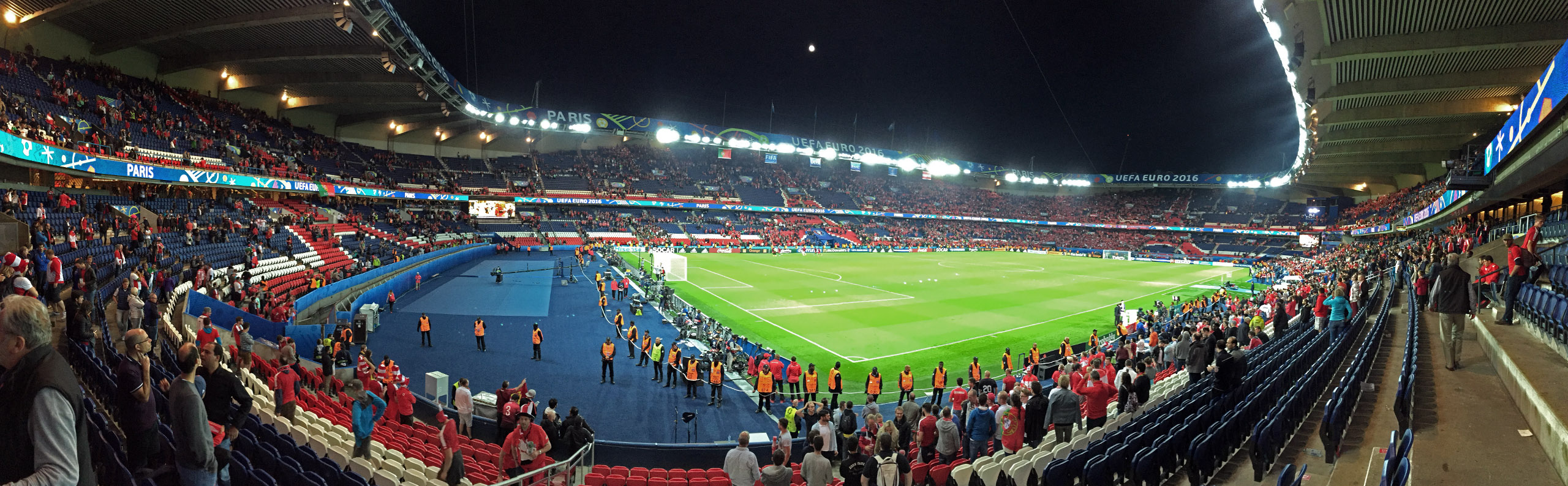
Parc des Princes

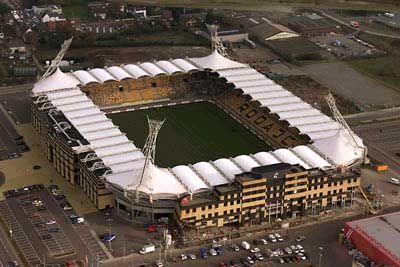
Parkstad Limburg Stadion

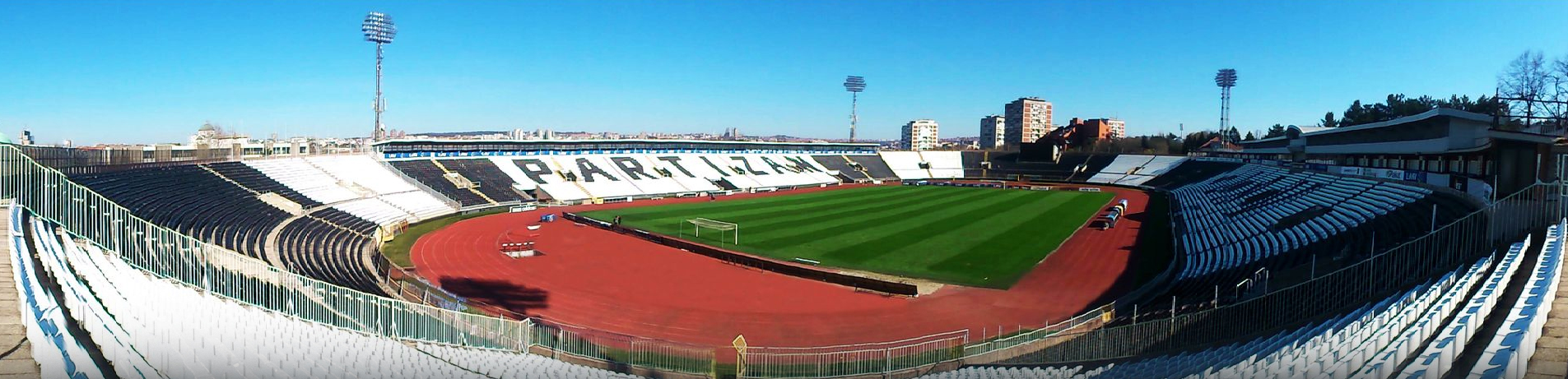
Partizan Stadium

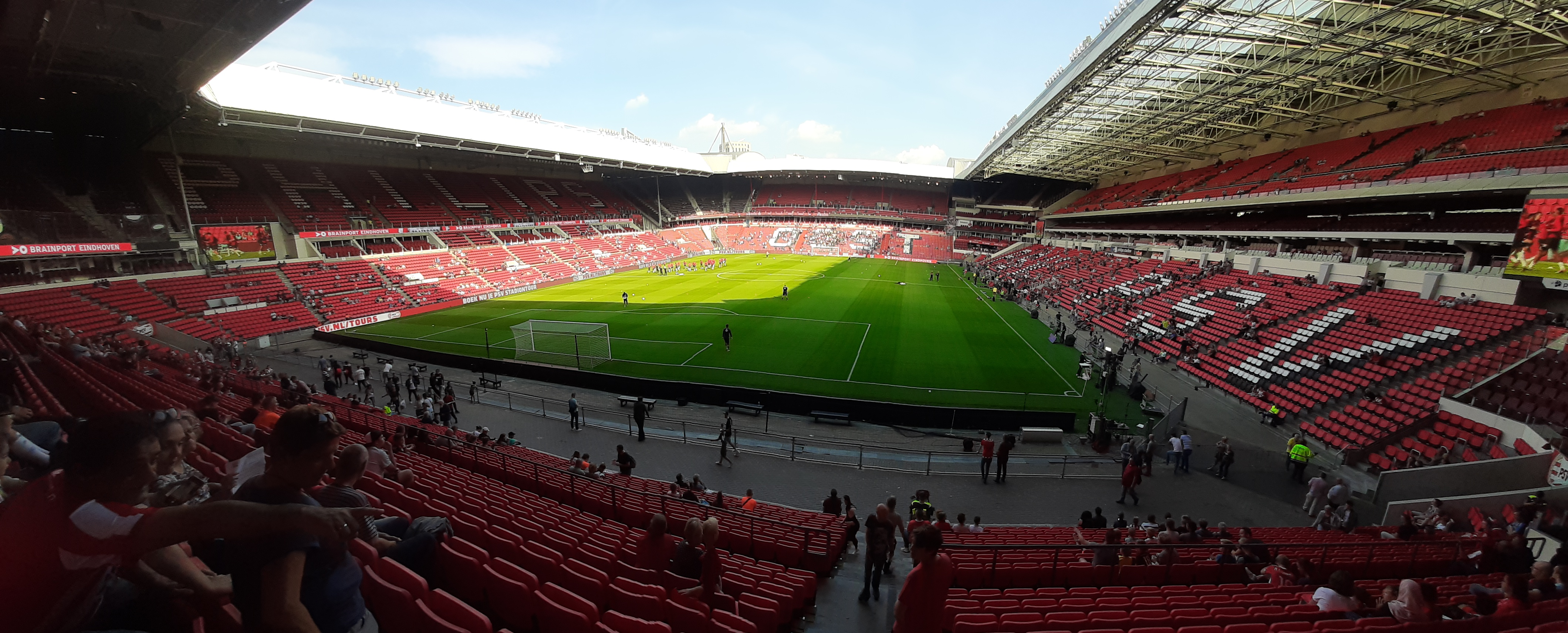
Philips Stadion

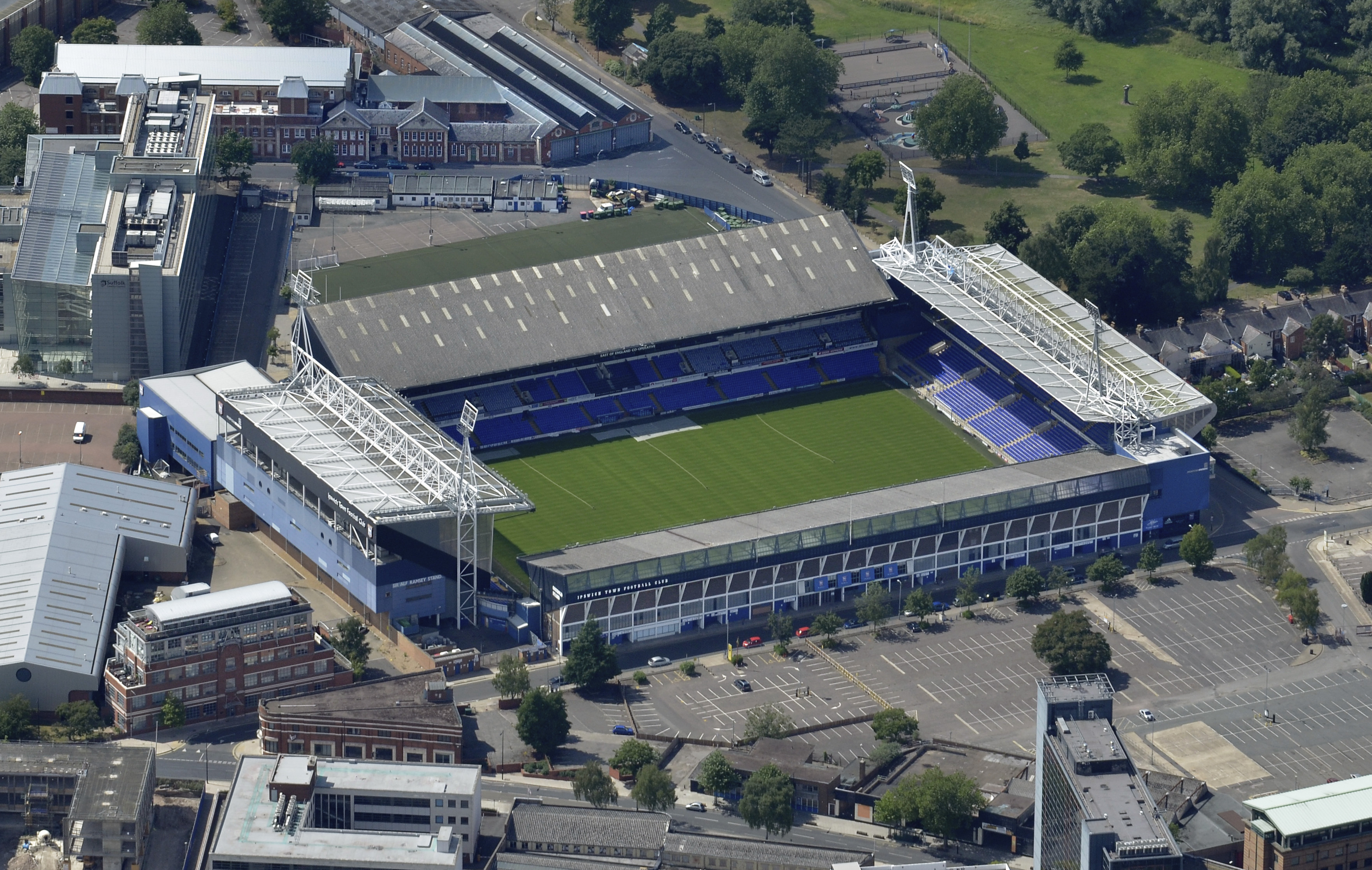
Portman Road

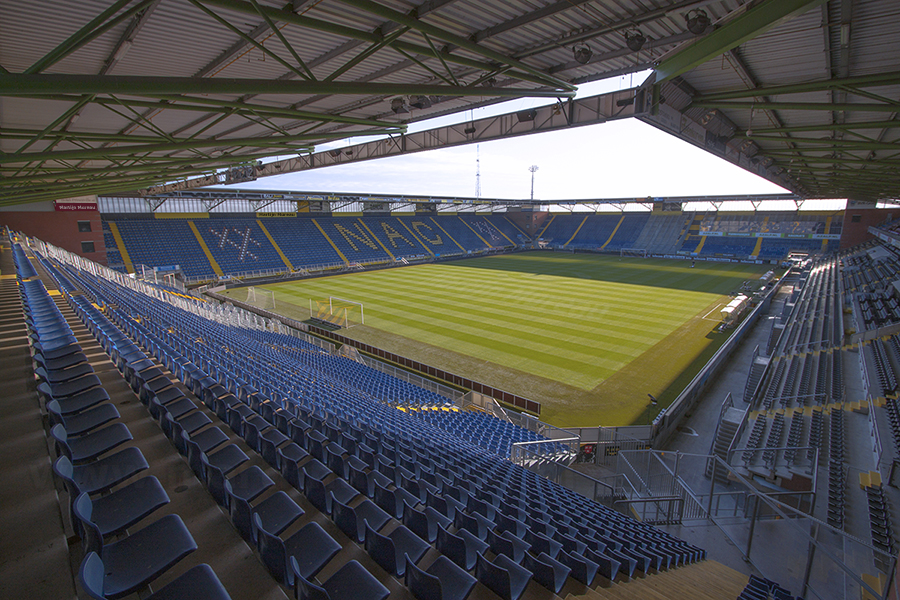
Rat Verlegh Stadion

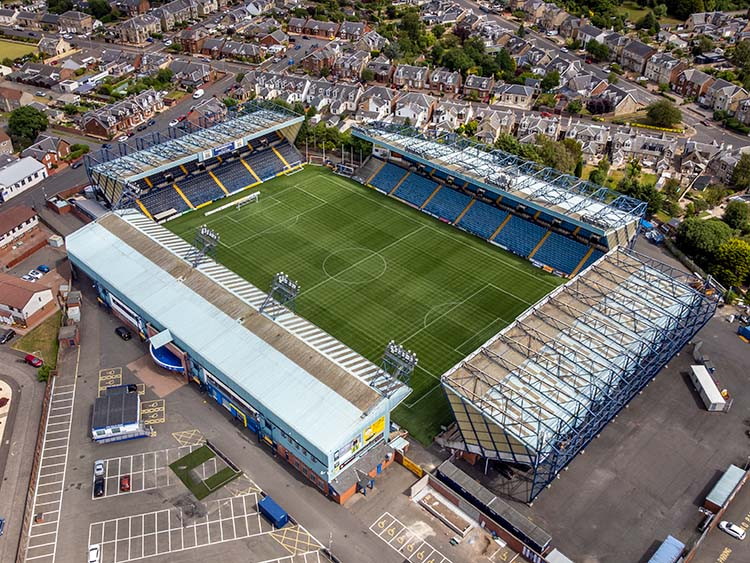
Rugby Park

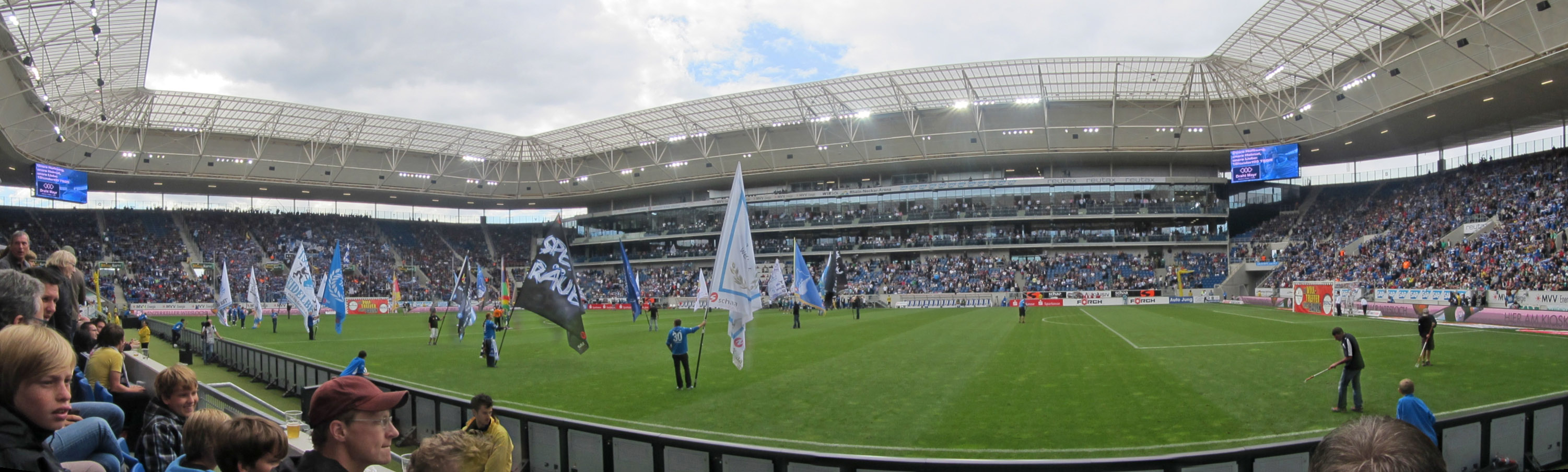
PreZero Arena

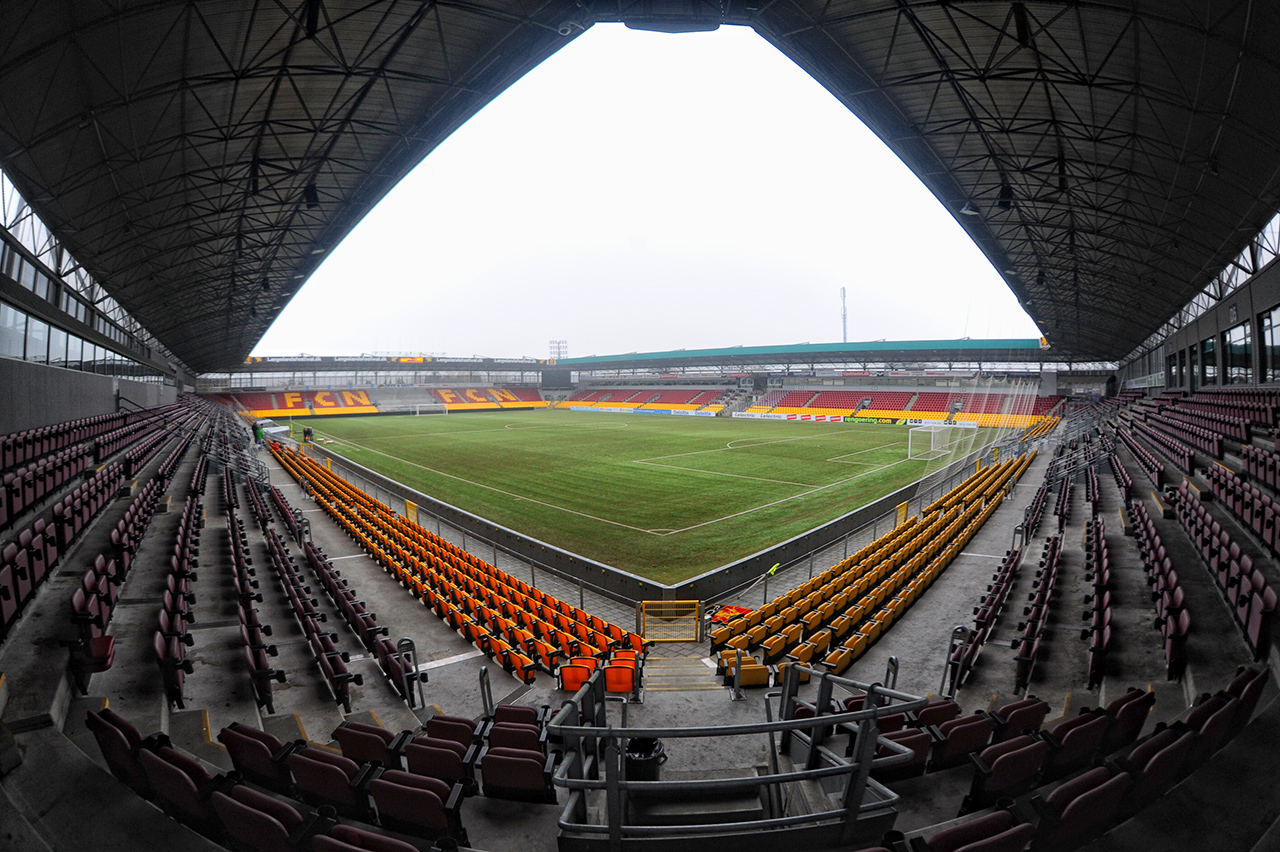
Right to Dream Park

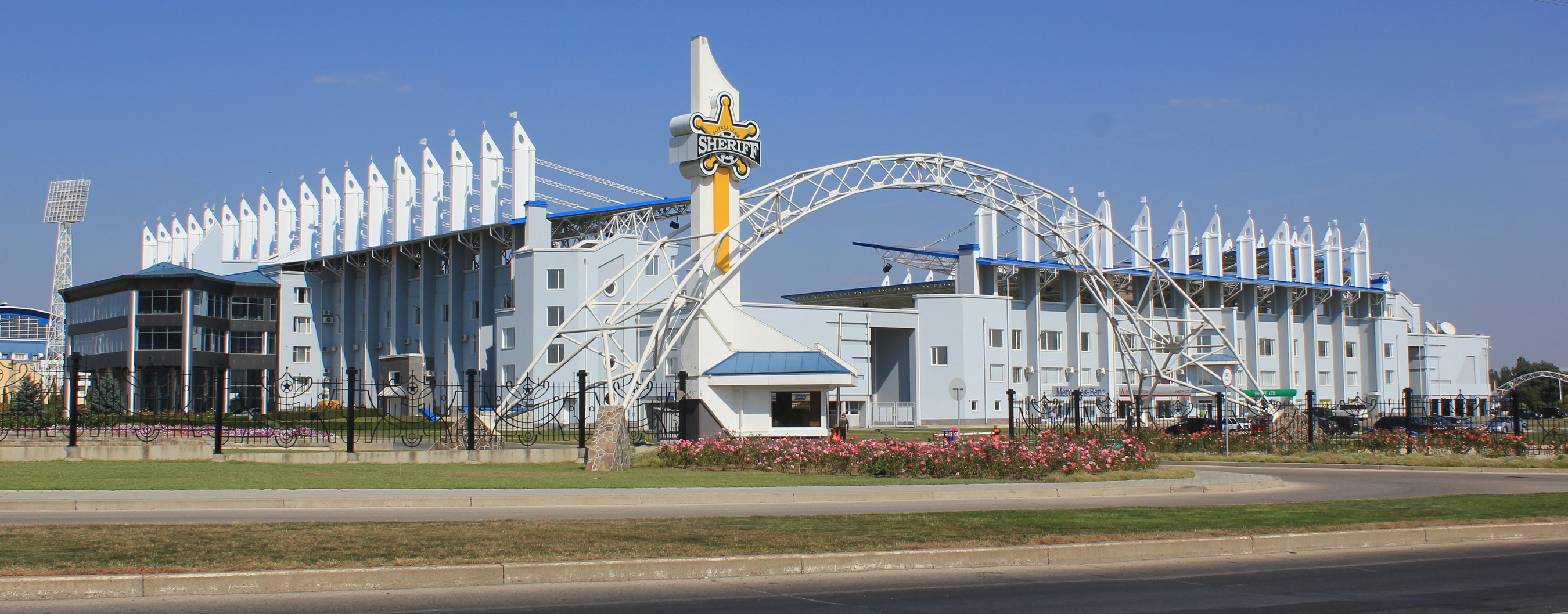
Sheriff Arena

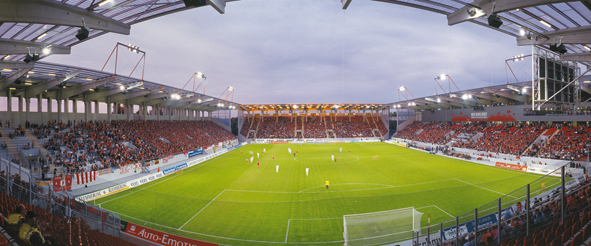
Sparda-Bank-Hessen-Stadion

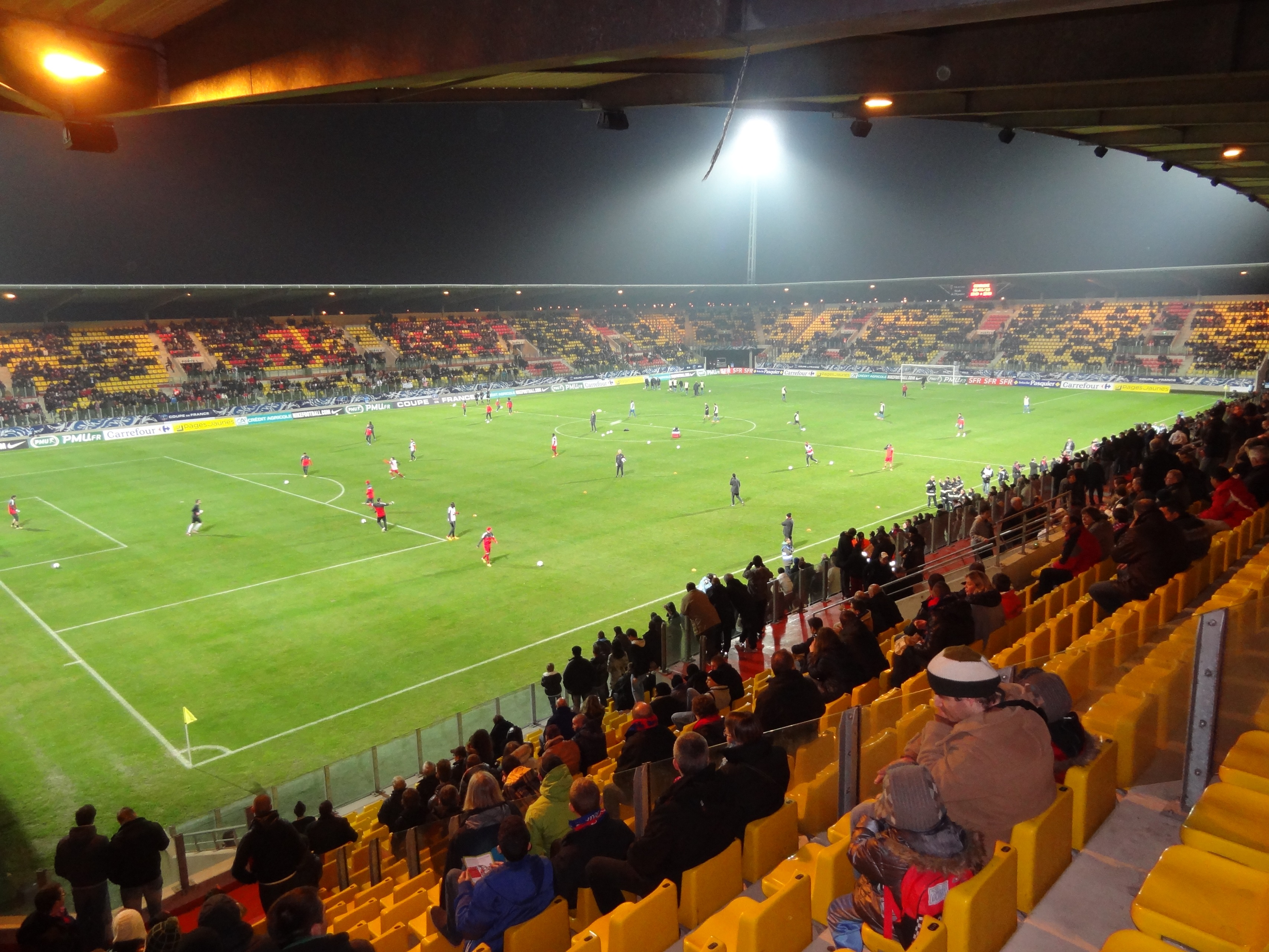
Stade de l'Épopée

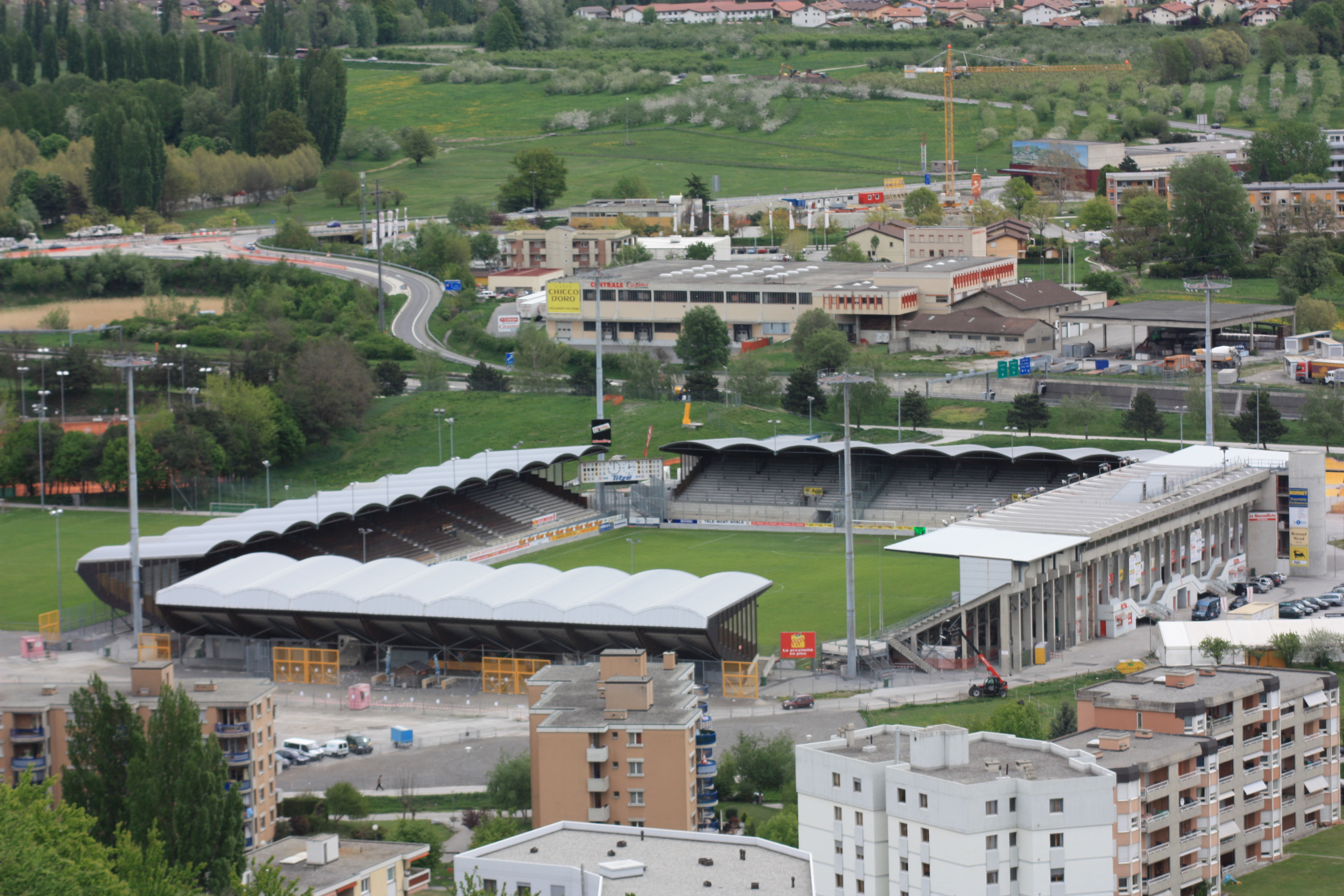
Stade de Tourbillon

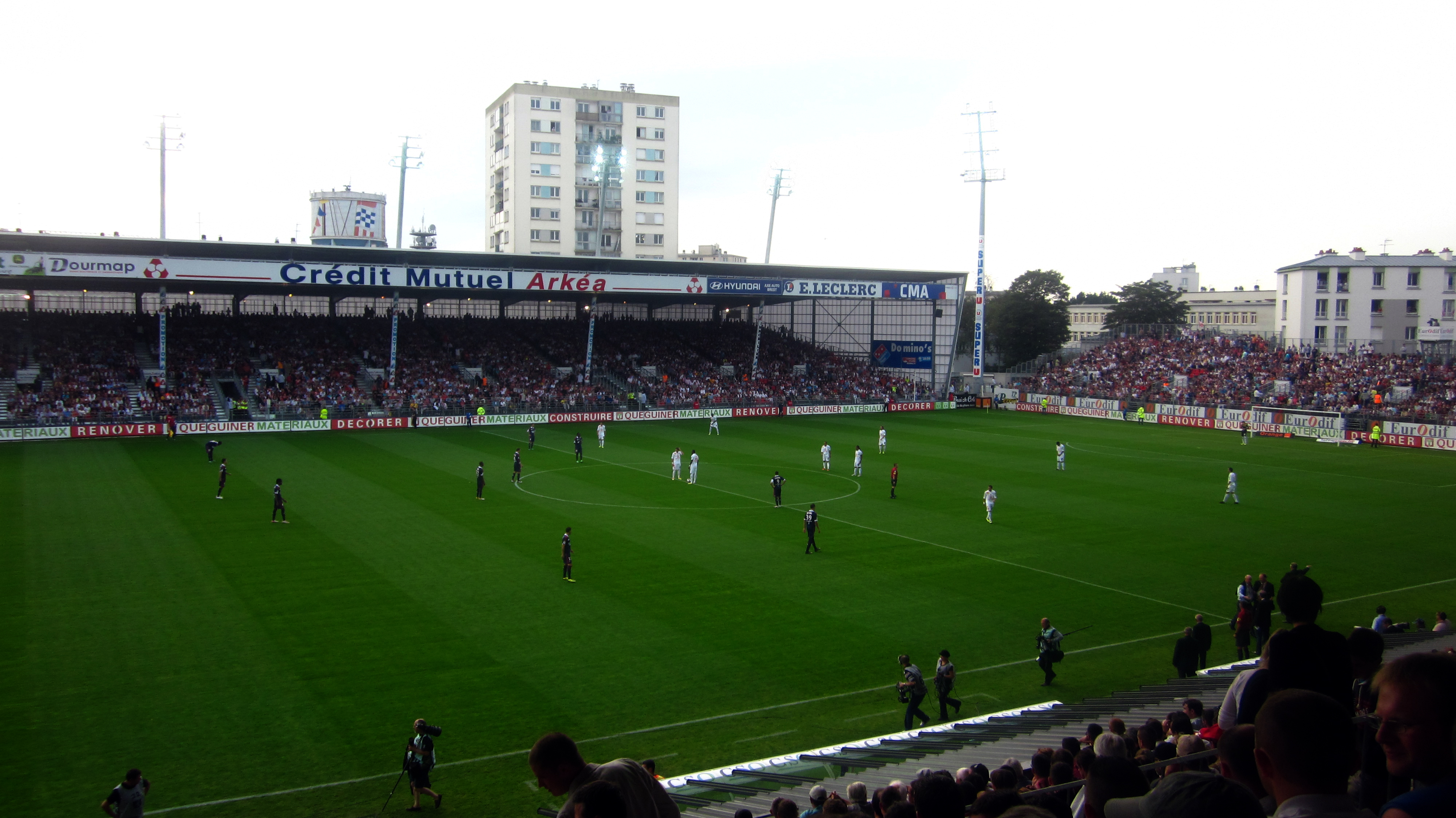
Stade Francis-Le Blé

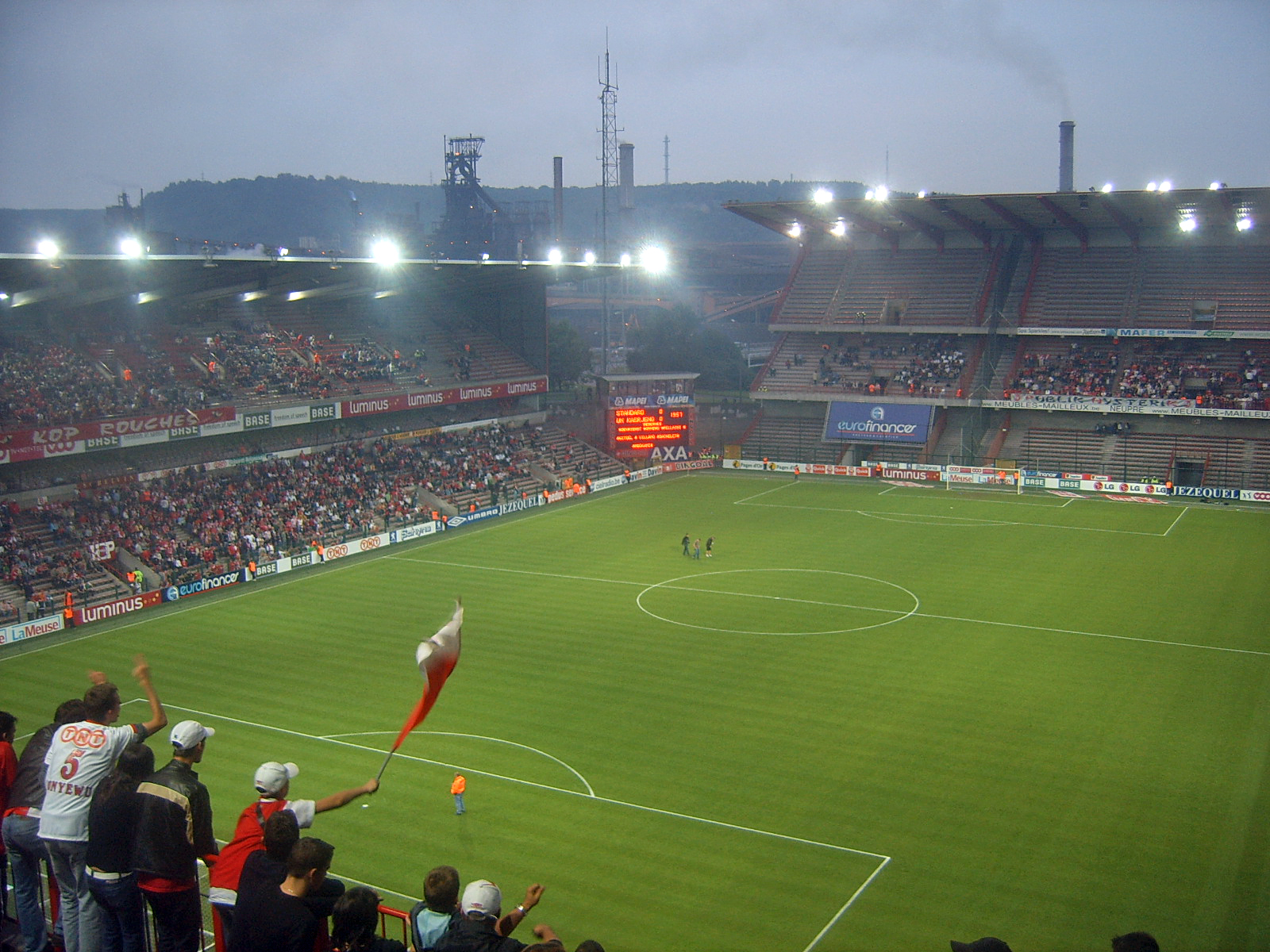
Stade Maurice Dufrasne

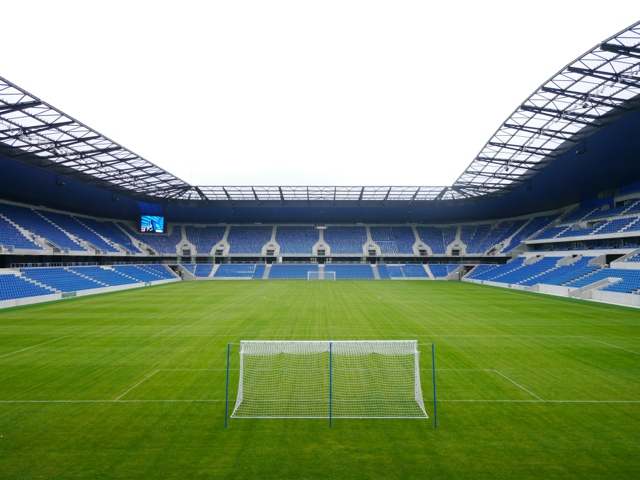
Stade Océane

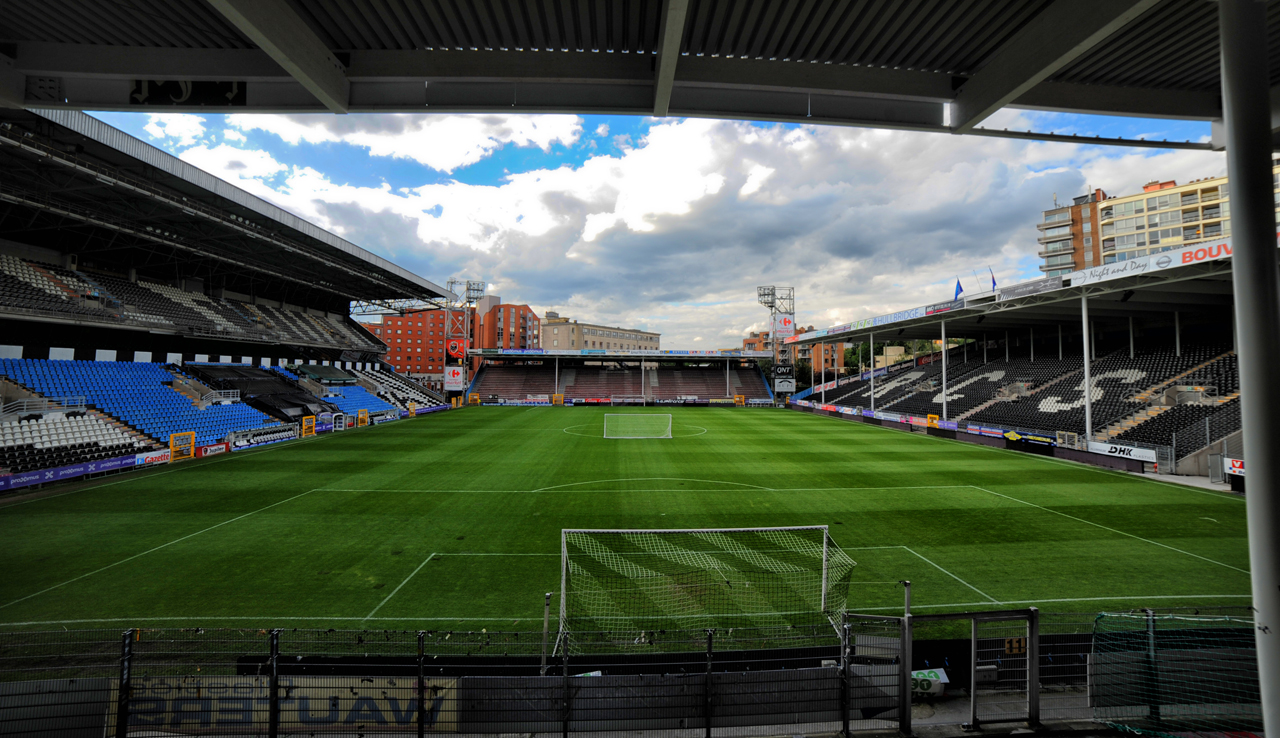
Stade du Pays de Charleroi

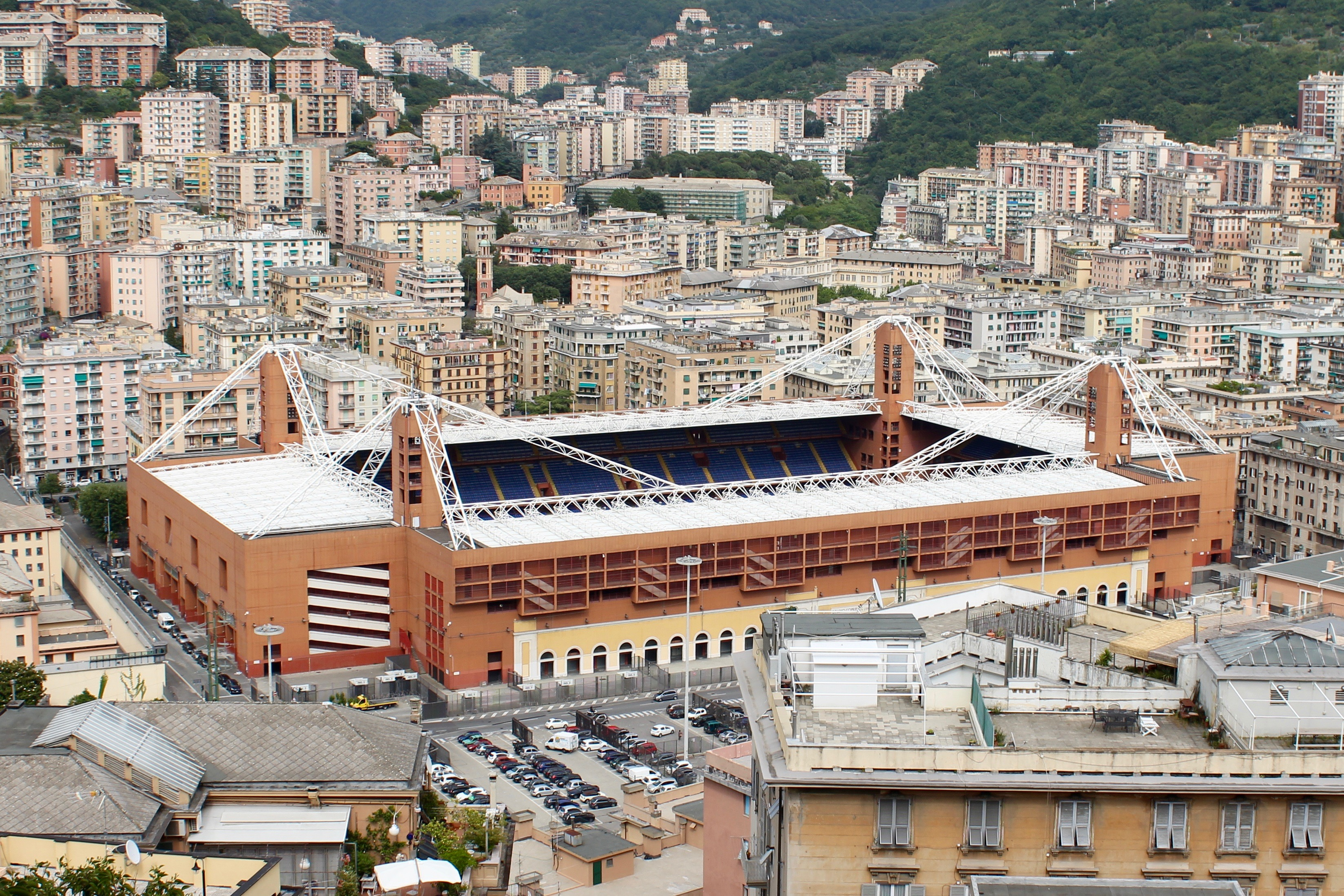
Stadio Luigi Ferraris

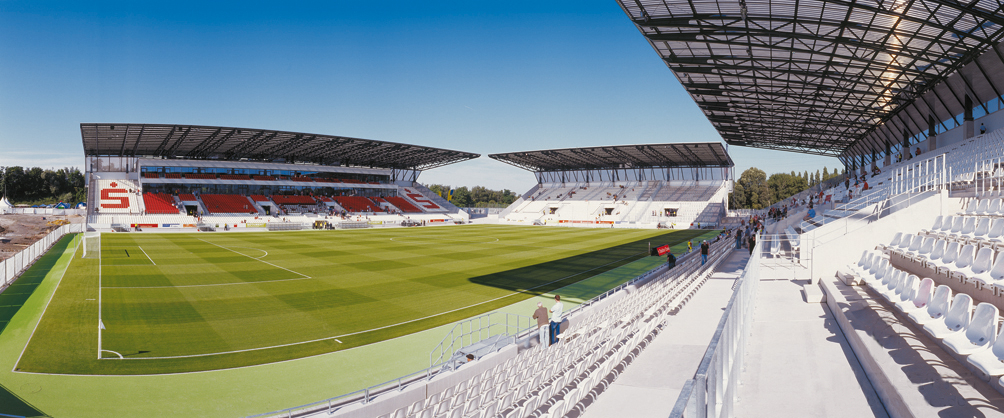
Stadion an der Hafenstraße

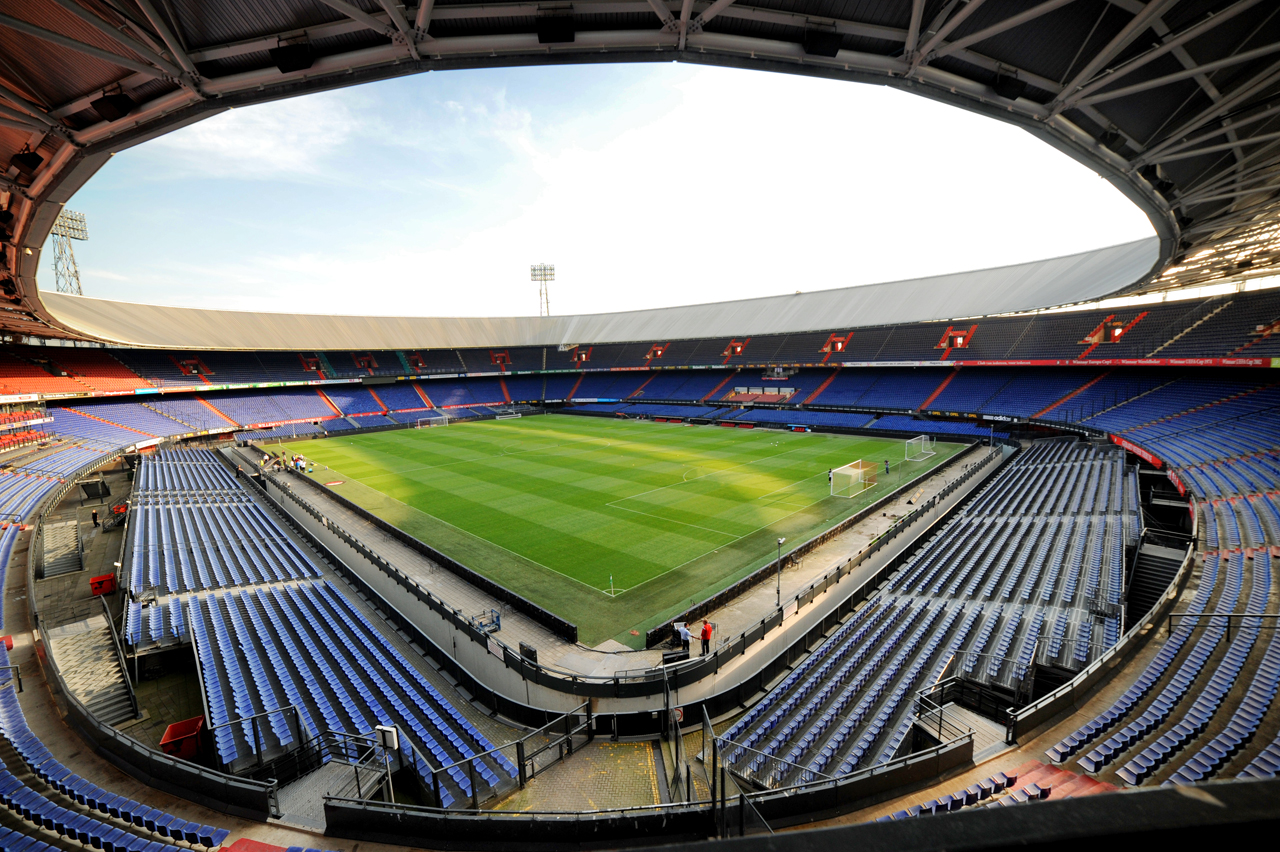
Stadion Feijenoord

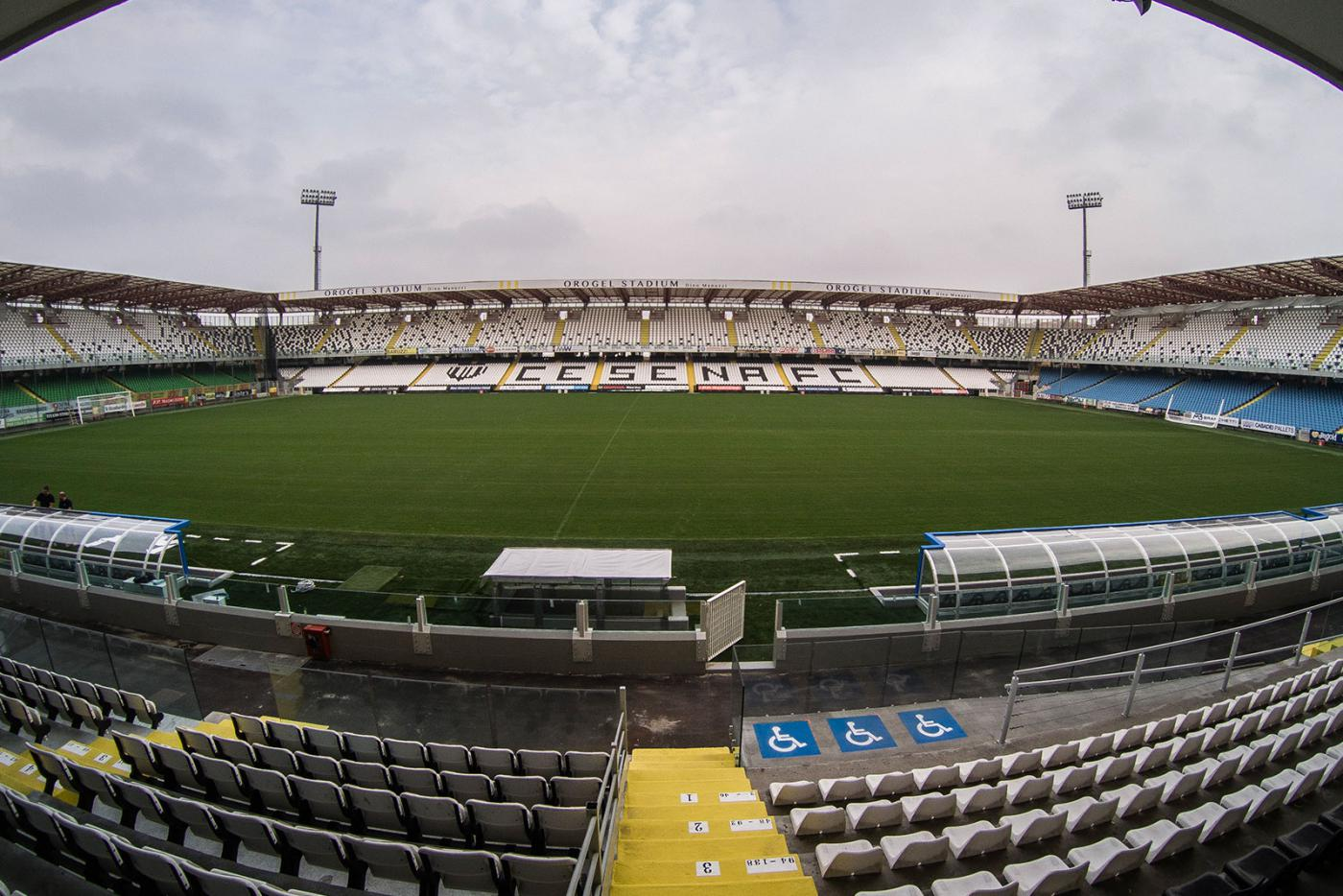
Stadio Dino Manuzzi

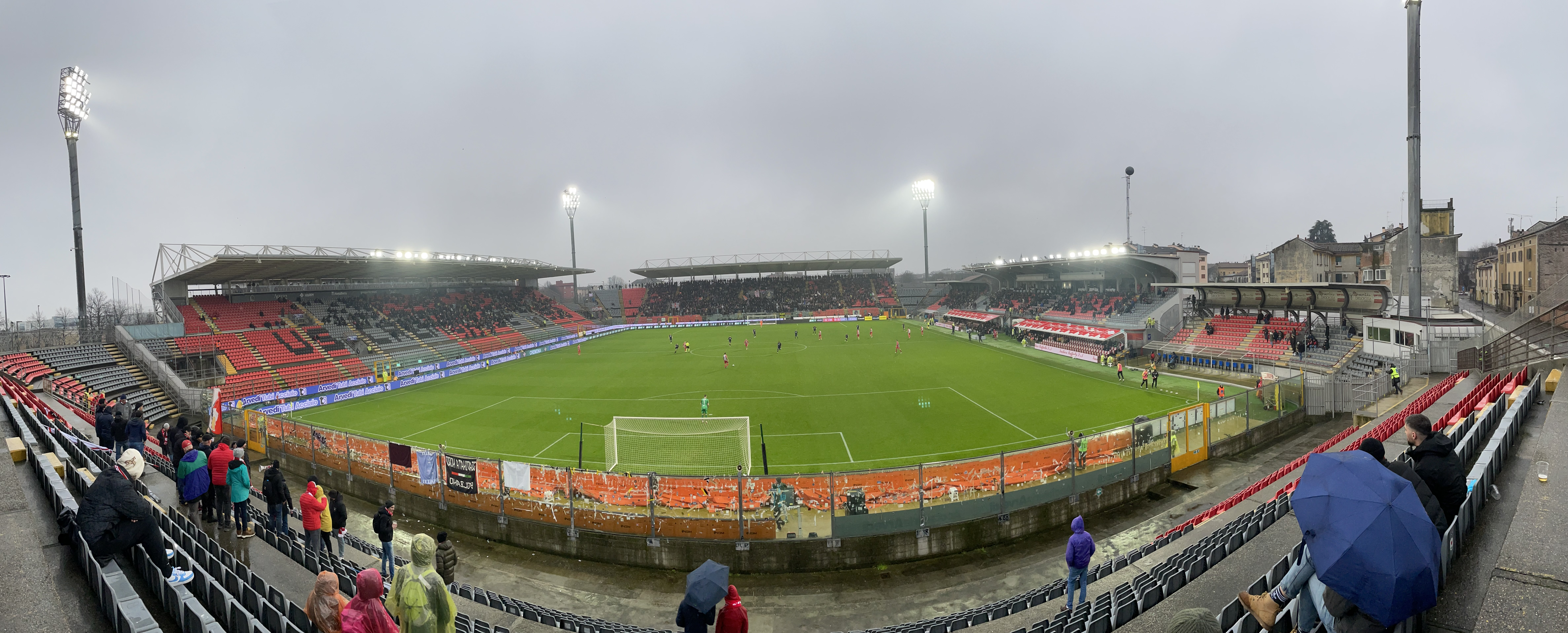
Stadio Giovanni Zini

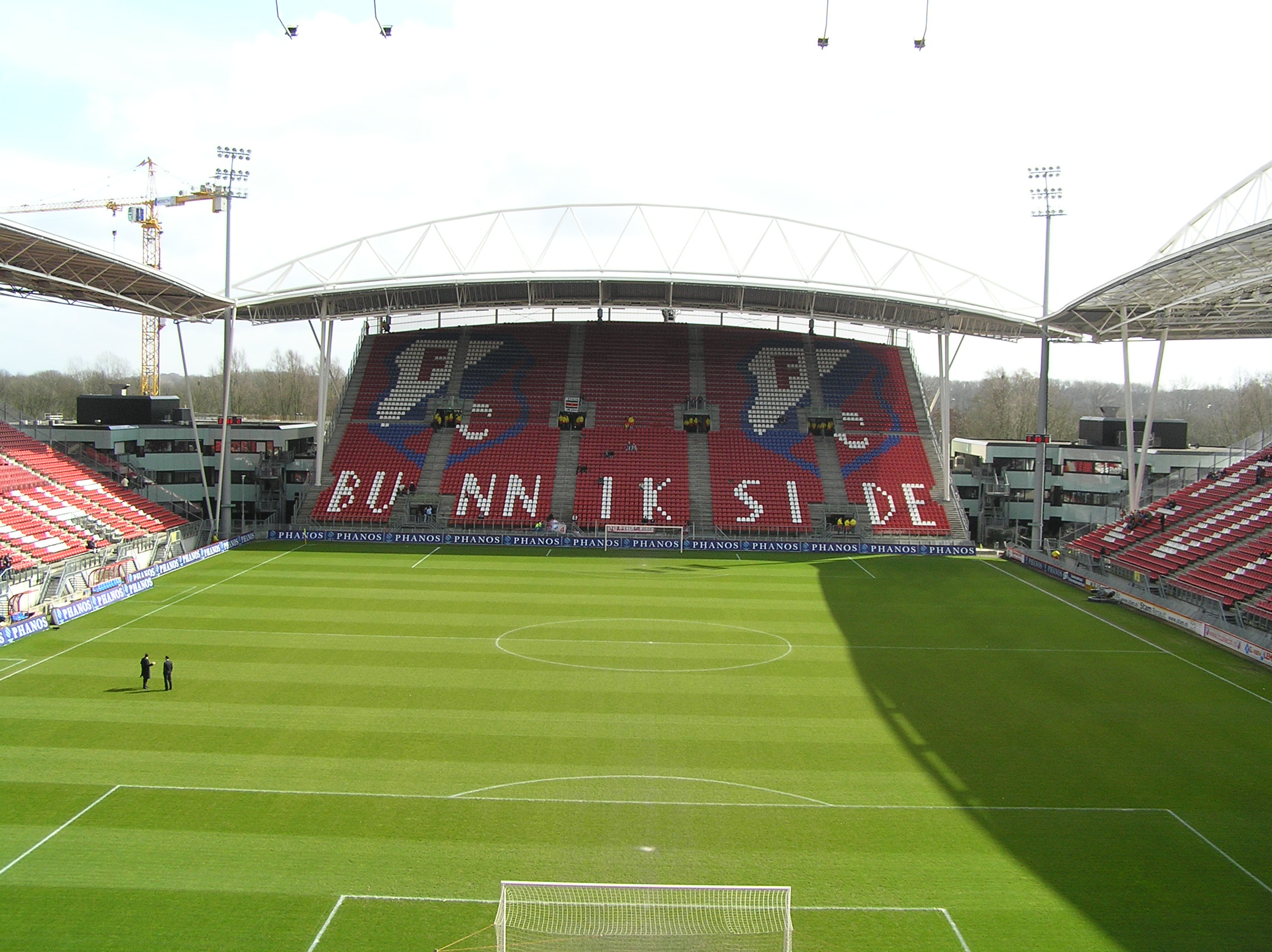
Stadion Galgenwaard

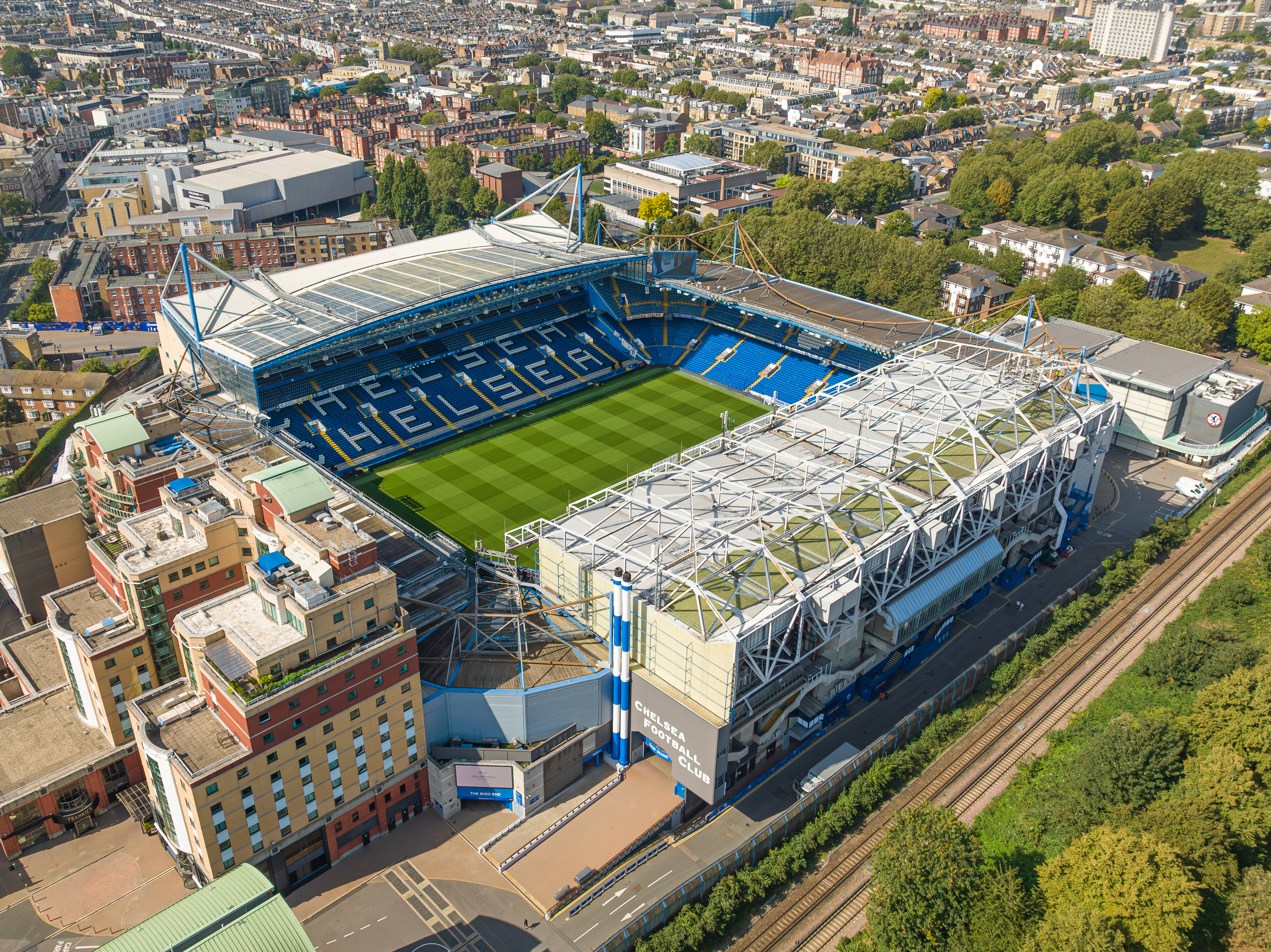
Stamford Bridge

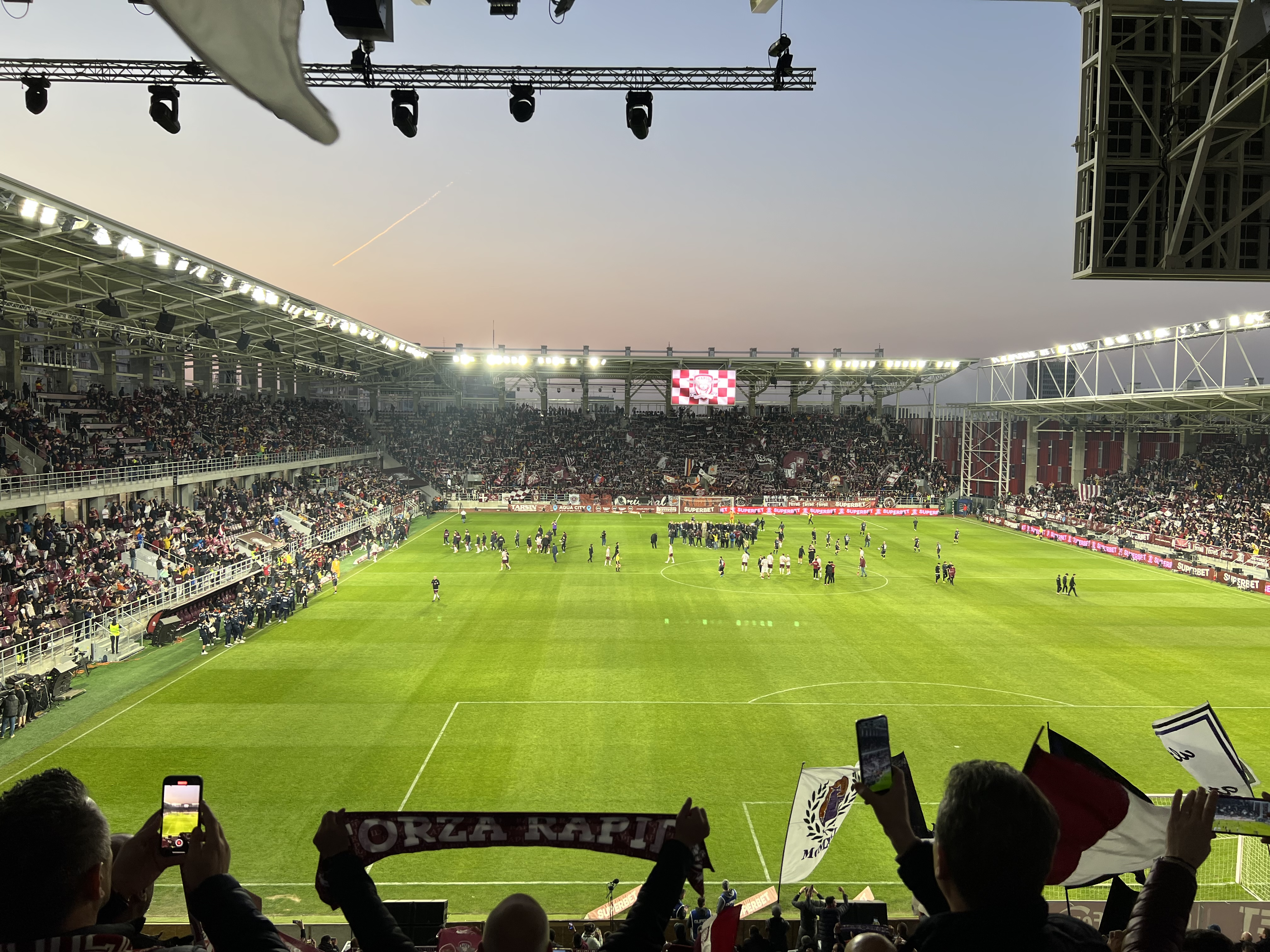
Superbet Arena – Giulești

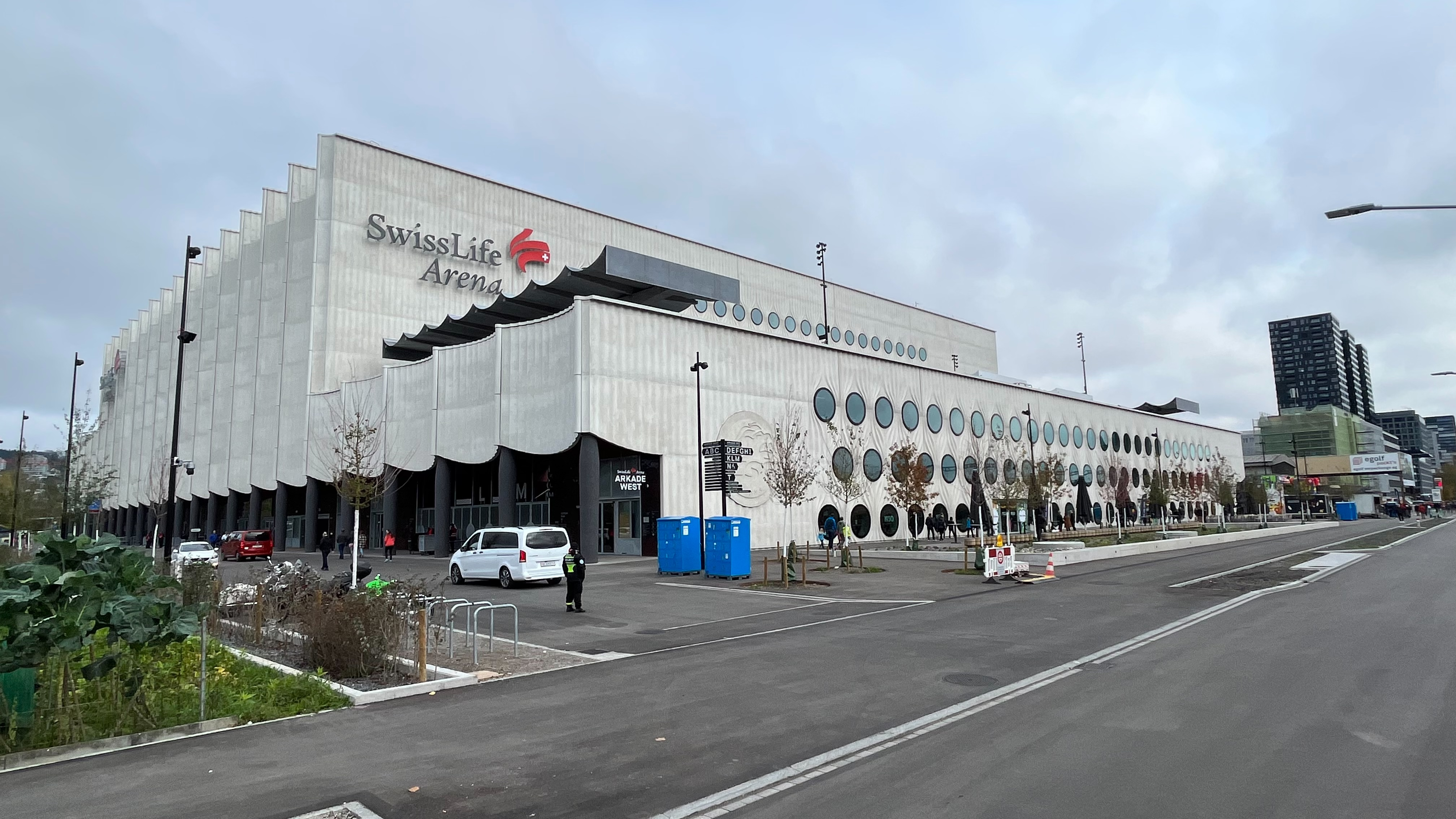
Swiss Life Arena

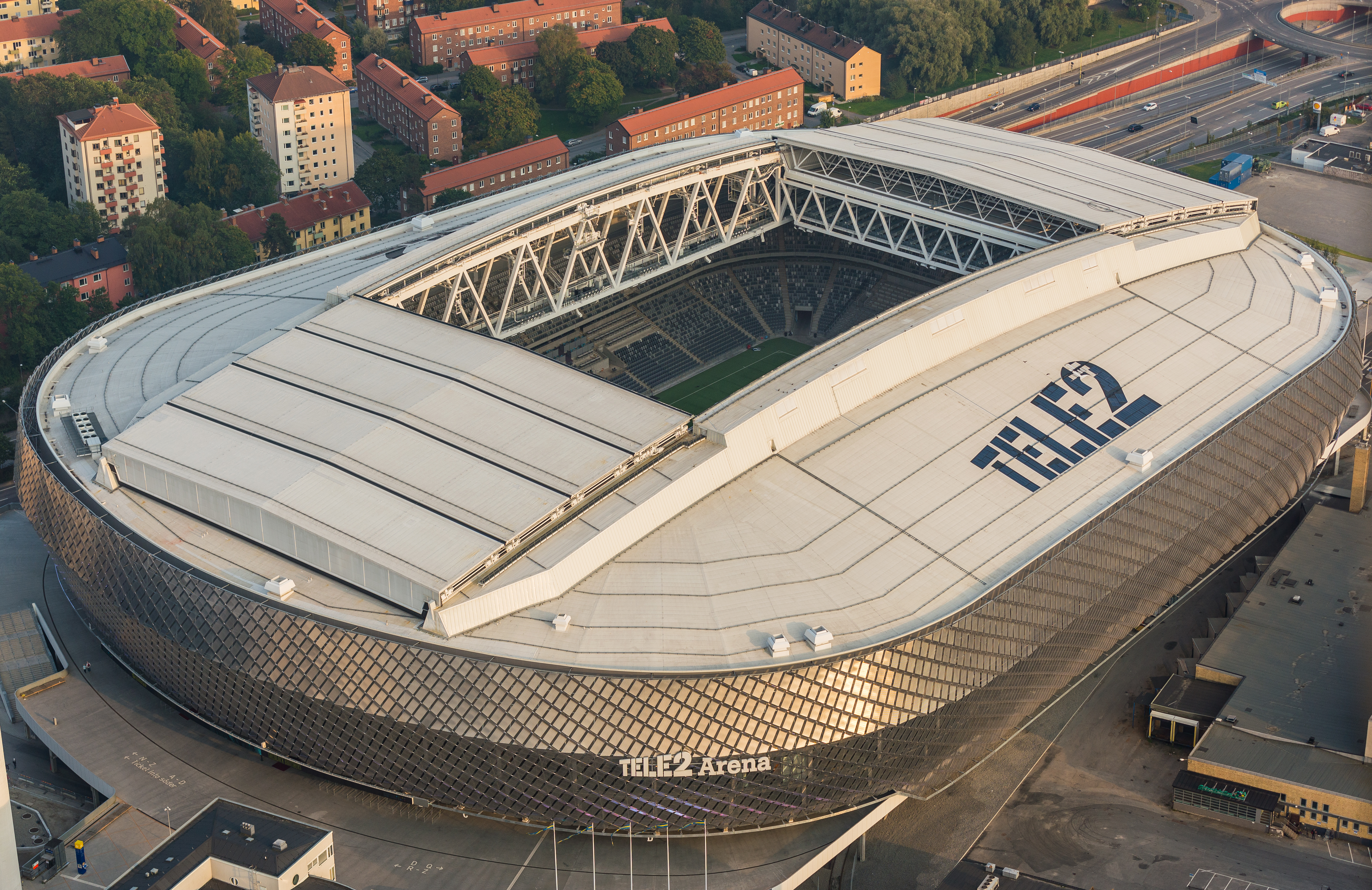
3Arena

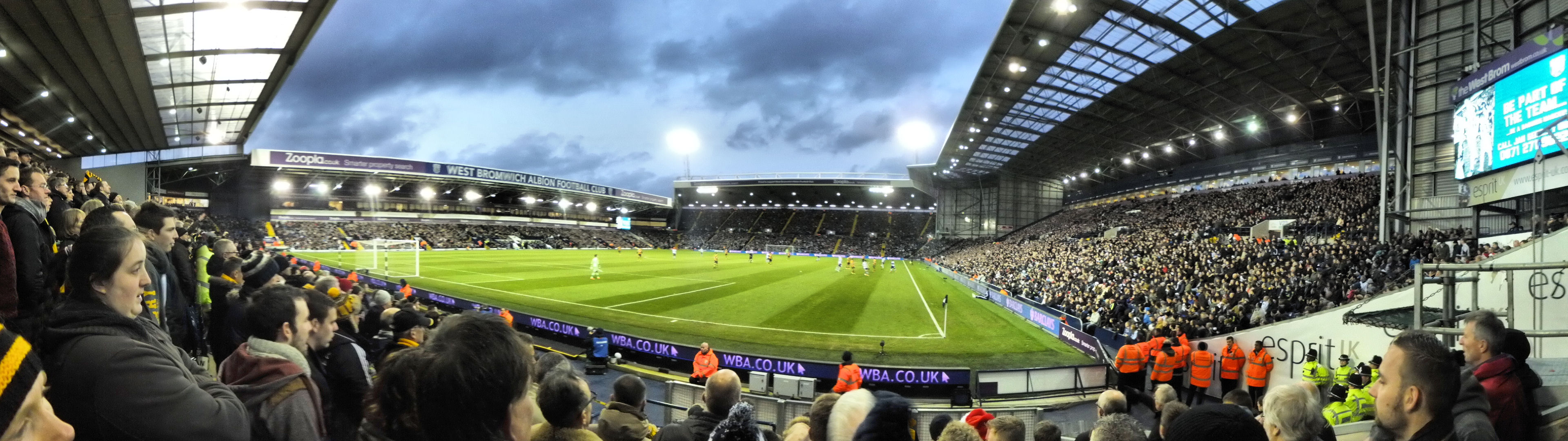
The Hawthorns

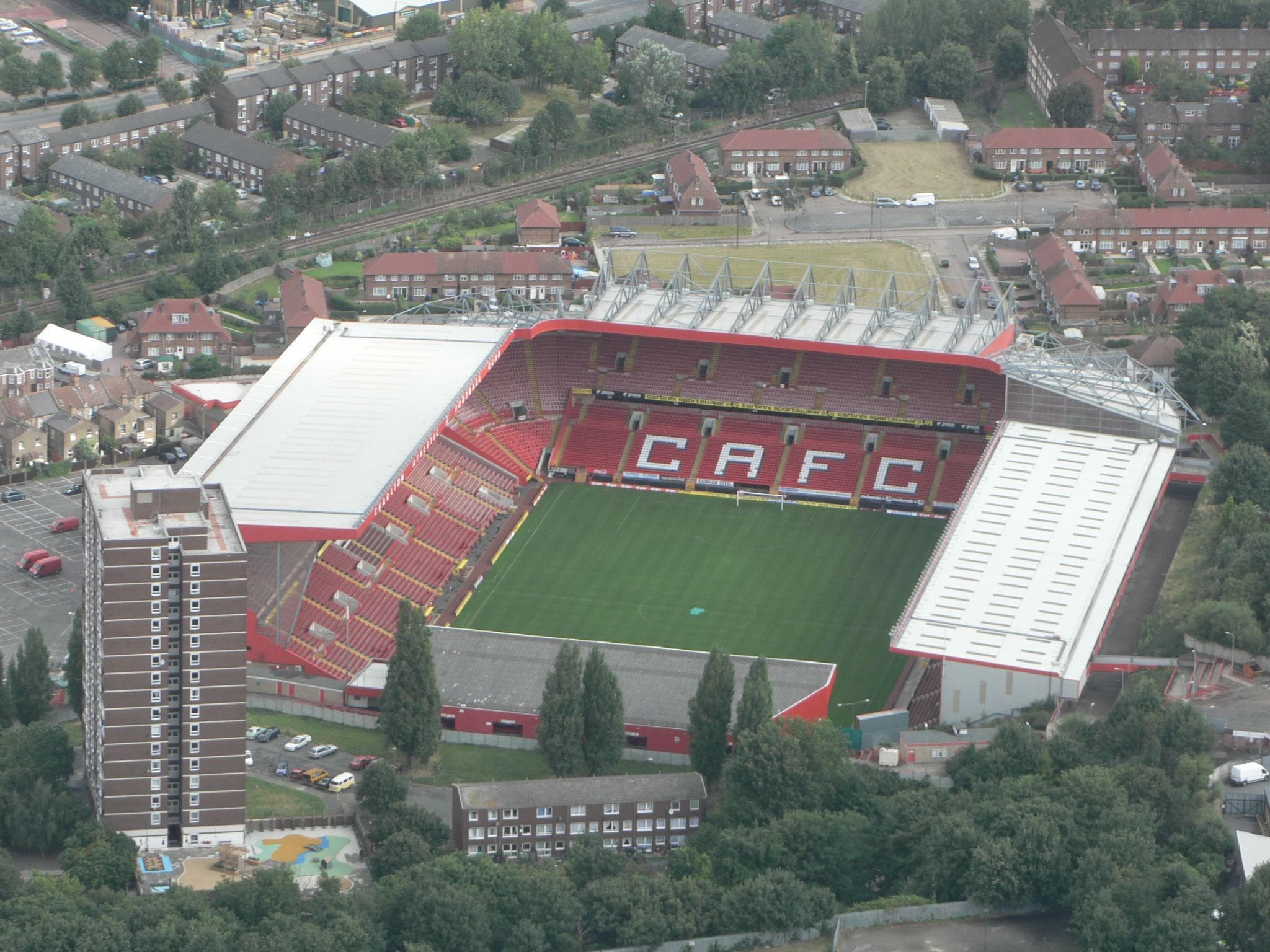
The Valley

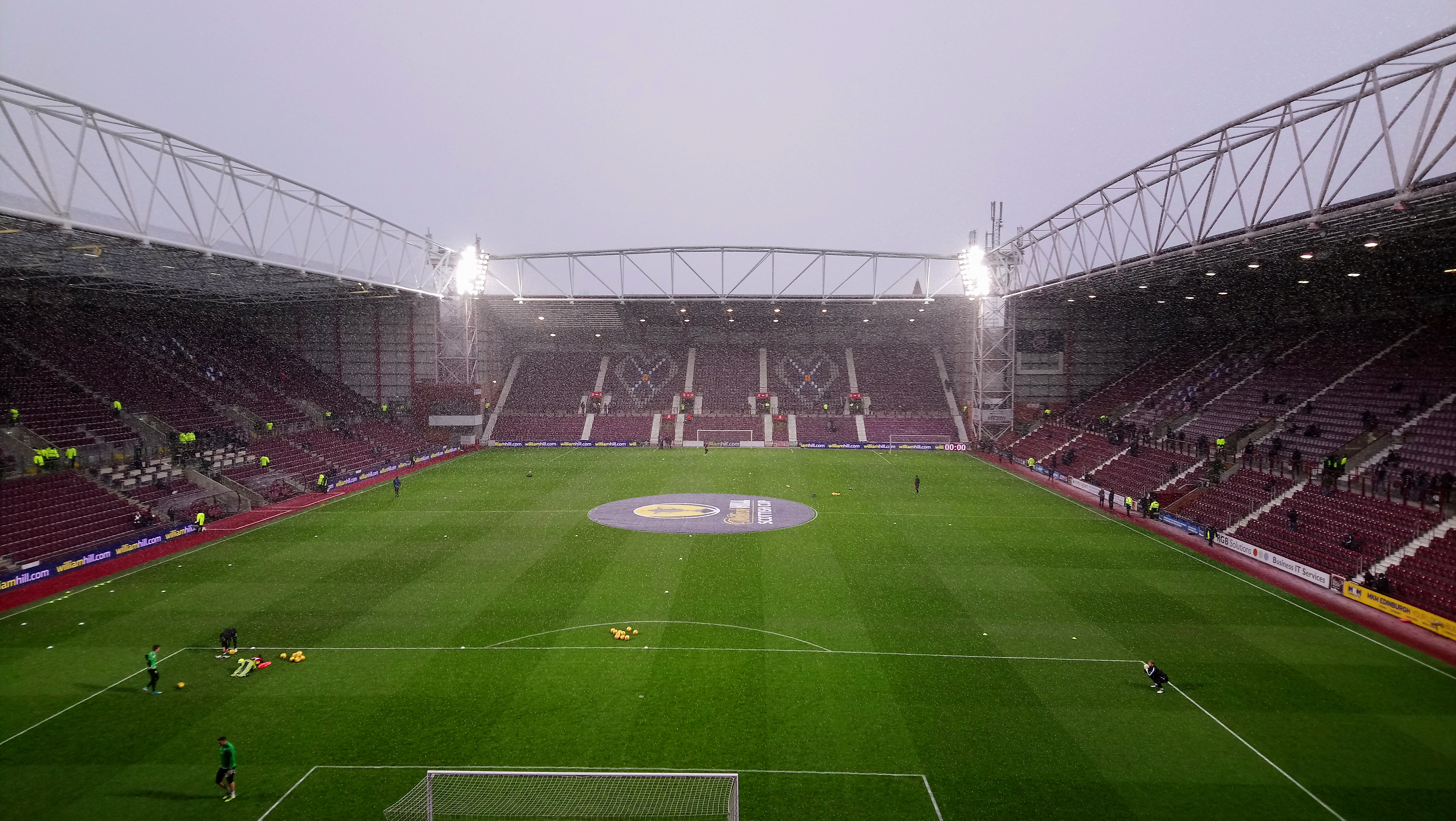
Tynecastle Park

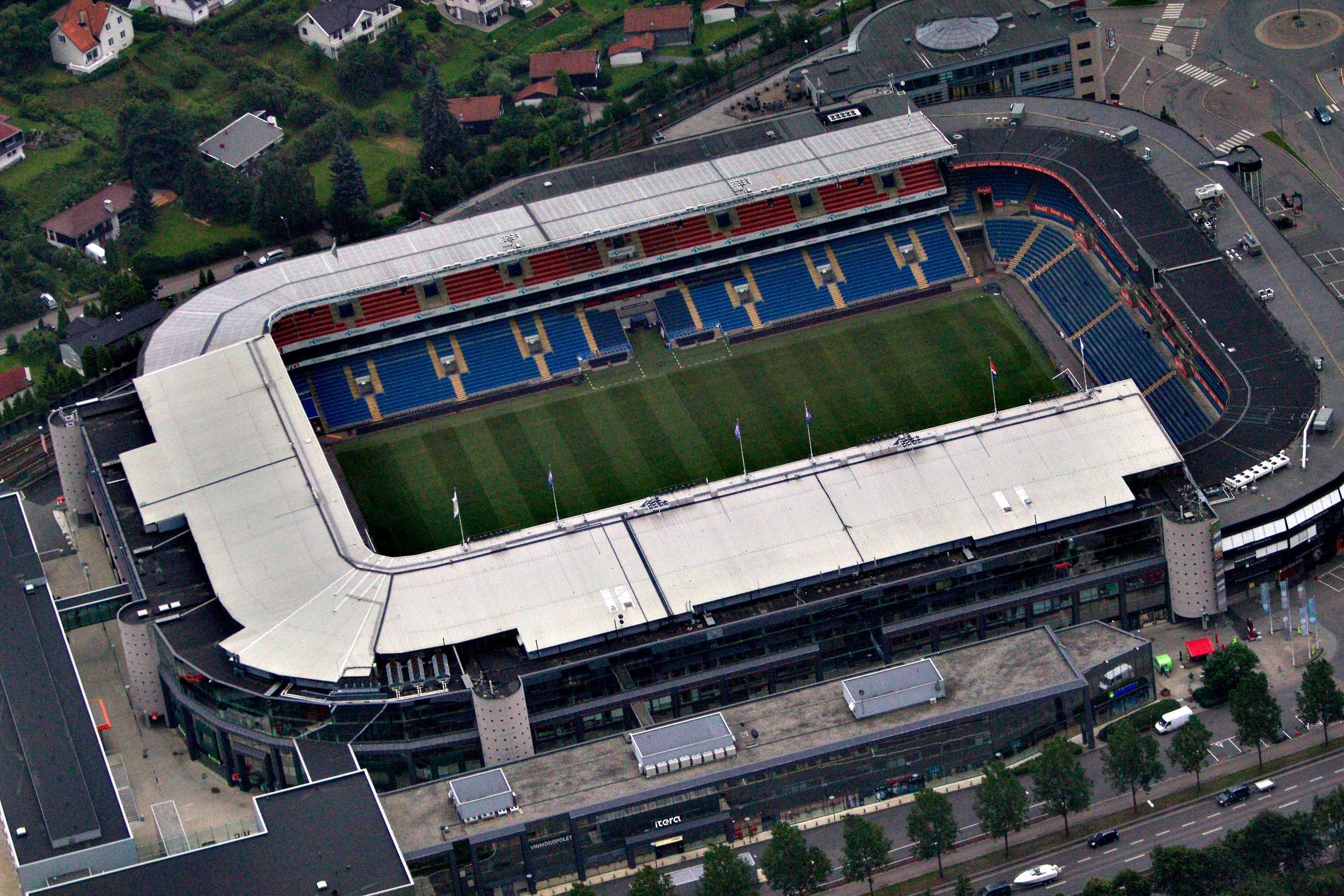
Ullevaal stadion

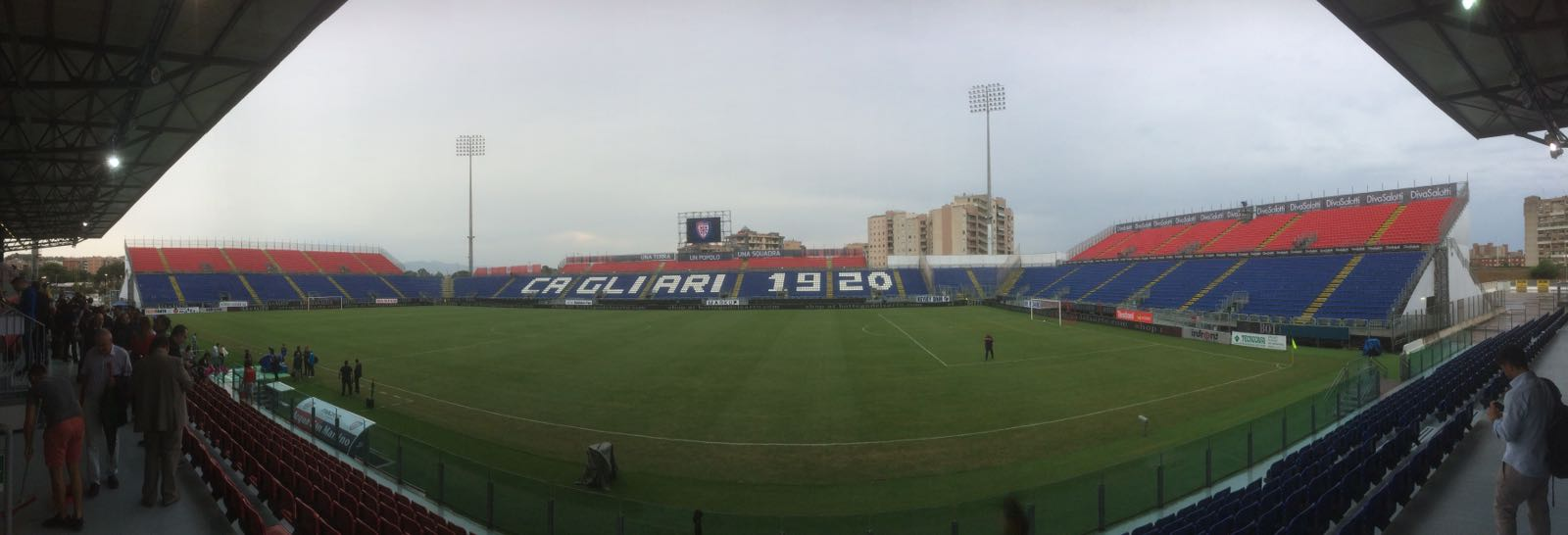
Unipol Domus

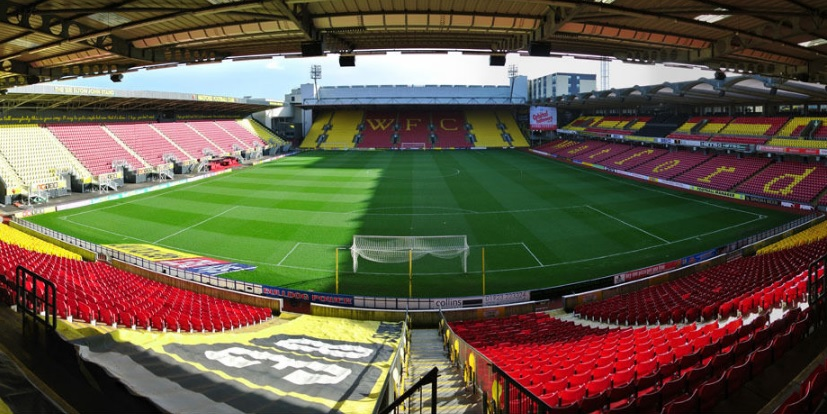
Vicarage Road Stadium

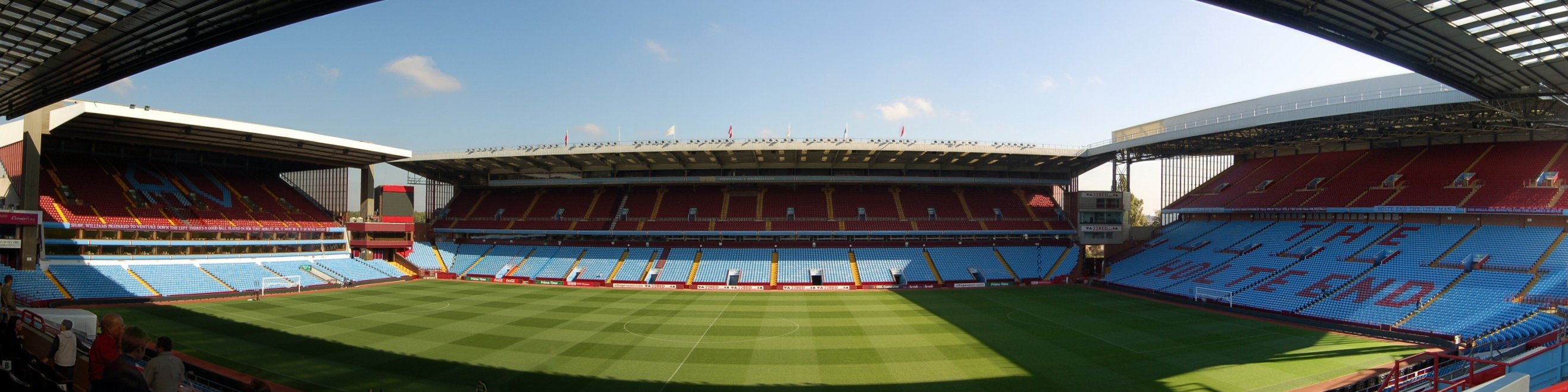
Villa Park

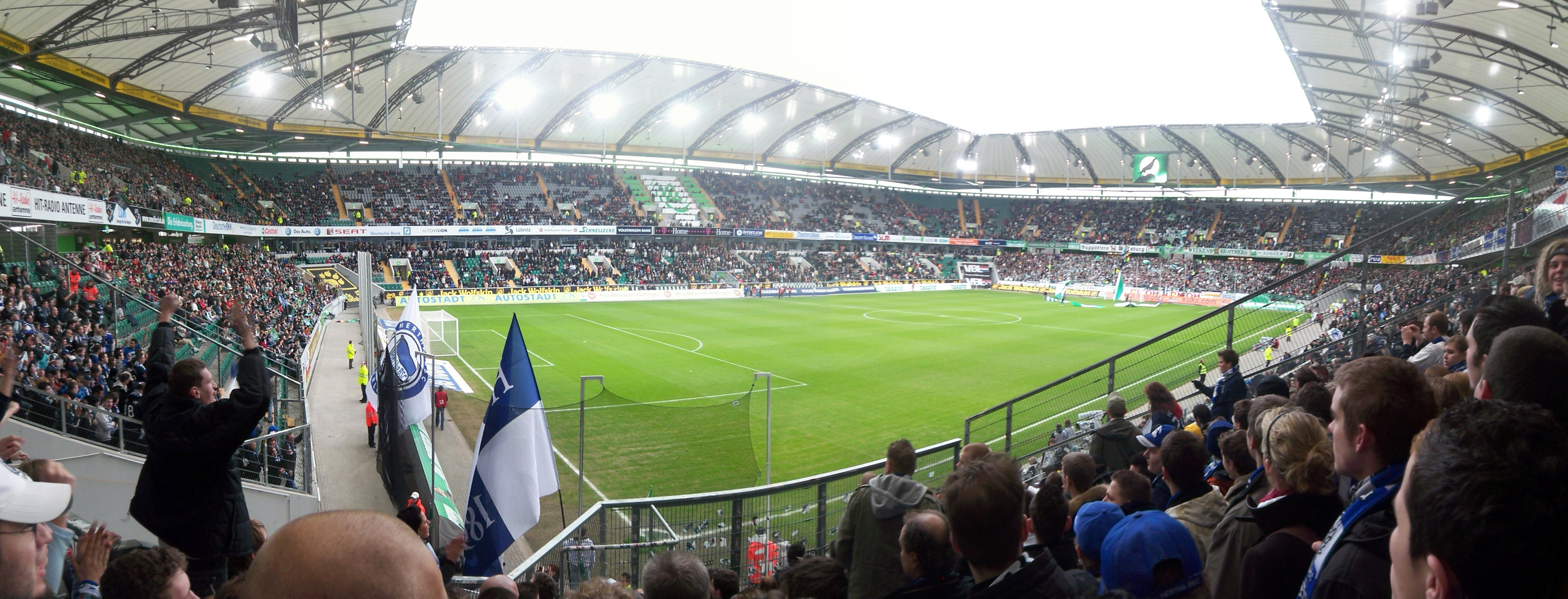
Volkswagen Arena

== See also ==
- List of stadiums in Africa
- List of stadiums in Asia
- List of stadiums in Central America and the Caribbean
- List of stadiums in North America
- List of stadiums in Oceania
- List of stadiums in South America
- List of European stadiums by capacity
- List of association football stadiums by country
- Lists of stadiums
