= Mathias-Stinnes-Stadion =

Multi-use stadium in Essen, Germany

Coordinates: 51°31′25″N 7°00′32″E

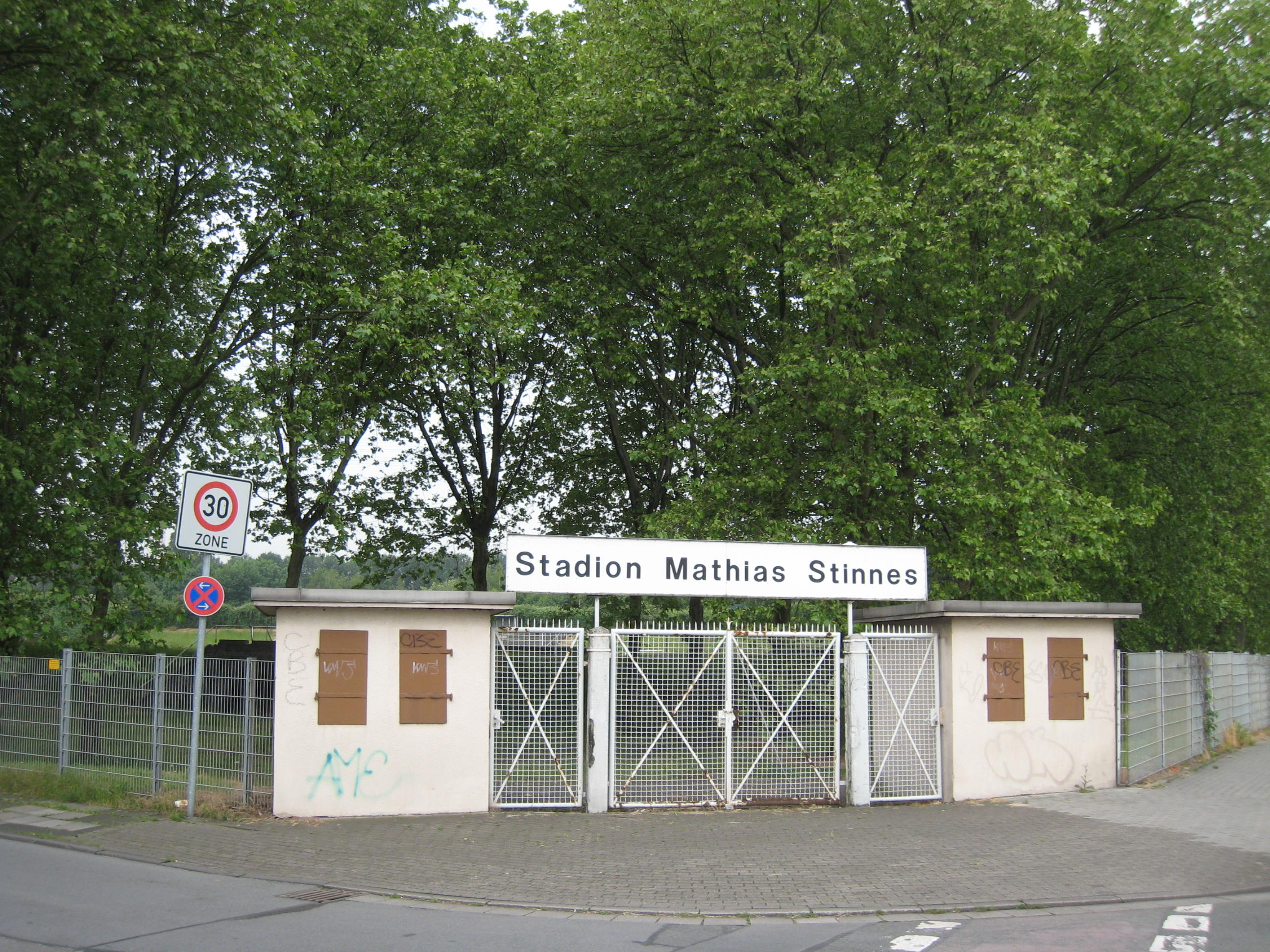
Stadion Mathias Stinnes Eingangsbereich

Mathias-Stinnes-Stadion is a multi-use stadium in Essen, Germany. It is currently used mostly for football matches. The stadium has a capacity of 12,000 people. In 1956, it was used as venue for the first unofficial fixture of a German female national team.
